= List of wild pigeons genera =

This page is a list of the genera of pigeons and doves (the family Columbidae), which are a clade of bird species of cosmopolitan distribution. The group has 310 living species. Extinct species assignment follows the Mikko's Phylogeny Archive and Paleofile.com websites. Classification is based on the work by John Boyd.

== Placement unresolved ==
- Genus †Arenicolumba Steadman, 2008
- Genus †Bountyphaps Worthy & Wragg, 2008 (Henderson Island archaic pigeon) (prehistoric)
- Genus †Dysmoropelia Olson, 1975 (Saint Helena dove)
- Genus †Rupephaps Worthy, Hand, Worthy, Tennyson, & Scofield, 2009 (St. Bathans pigeon, Miocene of New Zealand)

== Subfamily Columbinae (typical pigeons and doves) ==
- Tribe Zenaidini [Leptotilinae] (quail-doves and allies)
  - Genus Geotrygon (10 species)
  - Genus Starnoenas (blue-headed quail-dove)
  - Genus Leptotrygon (olive-backed quail-dove)
  - Genus Leptotila (11 species)
  - Genus Zenaida (7 species)
  - Genus Zentrygon (8 species)
- Tribe Columbini
  - Genus Patagioenas (American pigeons, 17 species)
  - Genus †Ectopistes (passenger pigeon; extinct 1914)
  - Genus Reinwardtoena (3 species)
  - Genus Turacoena (3 species)
  - Genus Macropygia (typical cuckoo-doves, 15 species)
  - Genus Streptopelia (turtle doves and collared doves, 13 species)
  - Genus Columba (Old World pigeons, 35 species of which 2 recently extinct)
  - Genus Spilopelia (2 species)
  - Genus Nesoenas (3 species)

== Subfamily Claravinae (American ground doves) ==
- Genus Claravis (blue ground dove)
- Genus Paraclaravis (2 species)
- Genus Uropelia (long-tailed ground dove)
- Genus Metriopelia (4 species)
- Genus Columbina (9 species)

== Subfamily Raphinae ==
- Tribe Phabini (bronzewings and relatives)
  - Genus Henicophaps (2 species)
  - Genus Gallicolumba (bleeding-hearts and allies, 7 species)
  - Genus Pampusana (13 species of which 3 recently extinct)
  - Genus Ocyphaps (crested pigeon)
  - Genus Petrophassa (rock pigeons, 2 species)
  - Genus Leucosarcia (wonga pigeon)
  - Genus Geopelia (5 species)
  - Genus Phaps (Australian bronzewings, 3 species)
  - Genus Geophaps (3 species)
- Tribe Raphini [Didunculinae; Otidiphabinae; Gourinae]
  - Genus ?†Natunaornis (Viti Levu giant pigeon) (prehistoric)
  - Genus Trugon (thick-billed ground pigeon)
  - Genus †Microgoura (Choiseul crested pigeon, extinct early 20th century)
  - Genus Otidiphaps (pheasant pigeon)
  - Genus Goura (crowned pigeons, 4 species)
  - Genus Didunculus (tooth-billed pigeon)
  - Genus ?†Deliaphaps De Pietri, Scofield, Tennyson, Hand, & Worthy, 2017 (Zealandian dove, Miocene of New Zealand)
  - Genus Caloenas (Nicobar pigeon)
  - Genus †Raphus (dodo, extinct late 17th century)
  - Genus †Pezophaps (Rodrigues solitaire, extinct c. 1730)
- Tribe Turturini
  - Genus Phapitreron (brown doves, 3 species)
  - Genus Oena (Namaqua dove, tentatively placed here)
  - Genus Turtur (wood doves, 5 species; tentatively placed here)
  - Genus Chalcophaps (emerald doves, 3 species)
- Tribe Treronini
  - Genus Treron (green pigeons, 23 species)
- Tribe Ptilinopini (fruit doves and imperial pigeons)
  - Genus Ducula (imperial pigeons, 36 species)
  - Genus Ptilinopus [Drepanoptila; Alectroenas] (fruit doves, some 50 living species, 1–2 recently extinct)
  - Genus Hemiphaga (2 species)
  - Genus Lopholaimus (topknot pigeon)
  - Genus Cryptophaps (sombre pigeon)
  - Genus Gymnophaps (mountain pigeons, 4 species)
  - Genus ?†Tongoenas Steadman & Takano, 2020 (Tongan giant pigeon) (prehistoric)
