= Ground-dove =

Ground dove refers to a number of genera in two distantly-related groups of doves.

- American ground doves (Claravinae):
  - Claravis pretiosa, the blue ground dove of the Neotropics.
  - Columbina, a genus of small, mostly terrestrial doves from the Americas.
  - Metriopelia, a genus of terrestrial doves which inhabit dry, high-altitude areas of South America.
  - Paraclaravis, a genus of rare, mostly arboreal doves from the Neotropics.
  - Uropelia campestris, the long-tailed ground dove of South America.
- Indo-Pacific ground doves (Raphinae: Phabini, in part):
  - Gallicolumba, a genus of variably-sized, mostly terrestrial doves from Southeast Asia.
  - Pampusana, a genus of variably-sized, mostly terrestrial doves from Southeast Asia and tropical Pacific islands.

Not to be confused is the thick-billed ground pigeon of the genus Trugon.
