= Treroninae =

Scientific classification
- Kingdom: Animalia
- Phylum: Chordata
- Class: Aves
- Order: Columbiformes
- Family: Columbidae
- Subfamily: Raphinae
- Tribe: Treronini

Genera
- 4, see text

Subfamily of birds

Treroninae is a subfamily of birds from the family Columbidae that has been replaced with the larger subfamily Raphinae.

Since 2007 Columbidae have been subdivided into three subfamilies, which are now called Columbinae, Claravinae and Raphinae. All the genera that were in Treroninae have been placed in the larger group Raphinae. The name Raphinae took precedence over the name Treroninae as it was older.

== Genera ==
- Alectroenas
- Cryptophaps
- Phapitreron
- Treron
