= Claravis =

Claravis may refer to:

- a brand name of the medication isotretinoin
- a genus of the blue ground dove
