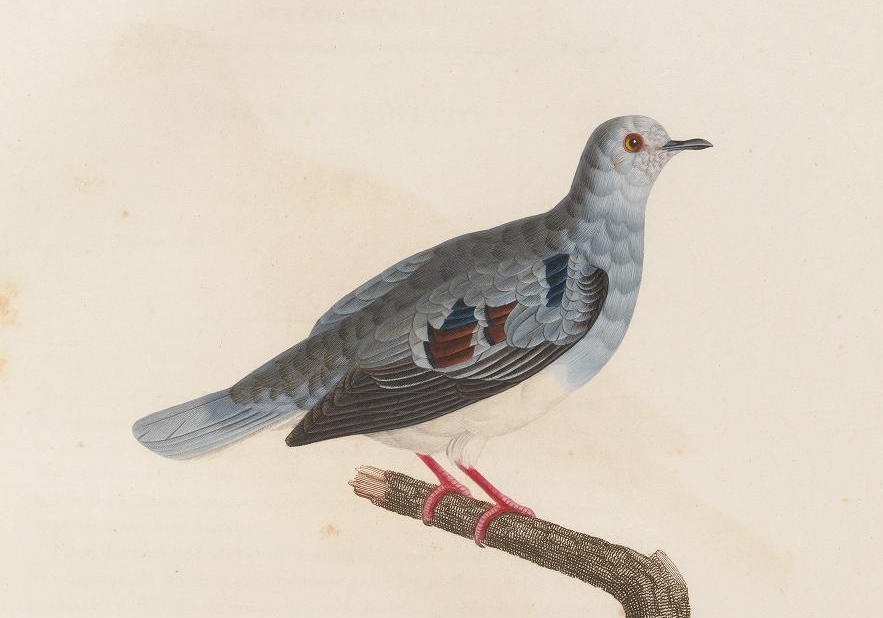

Conservation status
- Critically Endangered (IUCN 3.1)

Scientific classification
- Kingdom: Animalia
- Phylum: Chordata
- Class: Aves
- Order: Columbiformes
- Family: Columbidae
- Genus: Paraclaravis
- Species: P. geoffroyi

Binomial name
- Paraclaravis geoffroyi (Temminck, 1811)

Synonyms
- Claravis godefrida Claravis geoffroii

= Purple-winged ground dove =

Species of bird

The purple-winged ground dove (Paraclaravis geoffroyi) is a critically endangered species of dove, native to the Atlantic forest, mainly near bamboo, in south-eastern Brazil, far eastern Paraguay, and northern-eastern Argentina (Misiones only). It is threatened by habitat loss and possibly the wild bird trade, and could potentially even be extinct due to its specialized requirements.

== Behavior ==
It is a nomadic species that follows the masting events of certain species of Guadua bamboo of the Atlantic forest, namely takuarusu (G. chacoensis) and yatevó (G. trinii); it shares its trait with its closest relative, the maroon-chested ground-dove (Paraclaravis mondetoura), which instead specializes on Andean bamboo. This specialized lifestyle may be what led to such a dramatic decline in the species' population despite its relatively large former range, with the mass deforestation of the Atlantic forest in the late 20th century triggering an Allee effect akin to its extinct relative the passenger pigeon (Ectopistes migratorius), which also depended on masting events of nut-producing trees.

== Status ==
There have been no verifiable observations of the species since 1985, and it could very well be extinct, although numerous unverified records have been made since then, the most recent being a 2017 sighting of an individual in Argentina in a patch of Guadua trinii. Extinction models are divided on whether the species is extant or not; when only photographs, specimens and recordings are considered, the species is predicted to have gone extinct during the 2000s, but models that incorporate sight records support the species still being extant.

The species can be easily confused with the blue ground dove (Claravis pretiosa) which it occurs in sympatry with, in poor observation conditions, contributing to the disputed legitimacy of more recent observations.The violaceous quail-dove (Geotrygon violacea), another sympatric species with similar habitat requirements, has still been recorded in the region since the 1980s, raising further doubts over the survival of P. geoffroyi; mist netting efforts in the area have regularly captured G. violacea, but no P. geoffroyi. The nomadic nature of P. geoffroyi adds more doubt to the prospect of its survival, as it is unlikely that a nomadic species such as it would persist in a single location or travel over a large area unseen. However, the extremely secretive nature of the species and the lack of call recordings until recently indicate that the species may have naturally low detectability, especially outside of bamboo masting events.

If it is still extant, the total population is estimated to number 50 to 249 individuals. Areas in which the species could still potentially persist include the Serra do Mar of Brazil and most of Misiones province of Argentina, as these areas are expansive and undersurveyed compared to the rest of the Atlantic Forest remnants.

== In captivity ==
The species was kept and bred in the Brazilian aviculture community from the 1970s to the late 1980s, reaching a high of over 150 captive birds. However, new regulations on bird breeding imposed by IBAMA in the 1970s and 1980s led to the disbanding of most dove-breeding groups, with captive individuals being sent to IBAMA-authorized breeders who had little knowledge of how to take care of the birds, compounded by the lack of knowledge of the species' true endangerment in the wild at the time, and the last captive individuals are thought to have died out by the mid-1990s without producing any offspring, marking the end of one of the best chances to save the species from extinction. Sound recordings of the species have been acquired from former dove breeders and may be crucial at detecting the species in the wild on future surveys.
