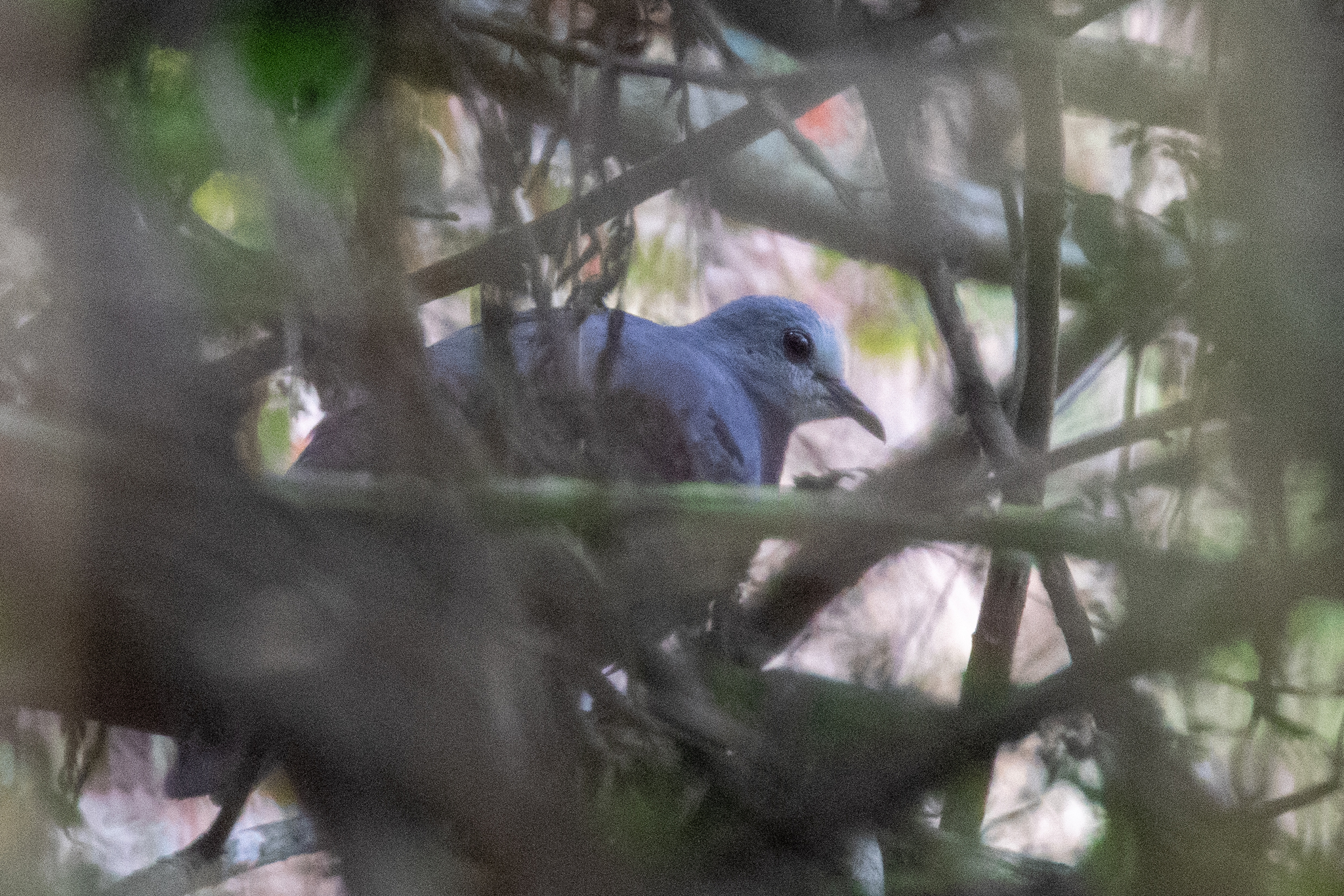

Conservation status
- Least Concern (IUCN 3.1)

Scientific classification
- Domain: Eukaryota
- Kingdom: Animalia
- Phylum: Chordata
- Class: Aves
- Order: Columbiformes
- Family: Columbidae
- Genus: Paraclaravis
- Species: P. mondetoura

Binomial name
- Paraclaravis mondetoura (Bonaparte, 1856)

Synonyms
- Claravis mondetoura

= Maroon-chested ground dove =

Species of bird

The maroon-chested ground dove (Paraclaravis mondetoura) is a species of bird in the family Columbidae. It is native to the American Cordillera of Central and South America.

== Taxonomy and systematics ==
The maroon-chested ground dove was originally placed in genus Claravis but a 2018 publication created the current genus Paraclaravis for it and the purple-winged ground dove (P. geoffroyi). The International Ornithological Committee (IOC) and Howard and Moore taxonomies treat it as monotypic. However, the Clements taxonomy and the Handbook of the Birds of the World ascribe these six subspecies to it:

- P. m. ochoterena van Rossem (1934)
- P. m. salvini Griscom (1930)
- P. m. umbrina Griscom (1930)
- P. m. pulchra Griscom (1930)
- P. m. mondetoura Bonaparte (1856)
- P. m. inca van Rossem (1934)

The Cornell Lab of Ornithology's Birds of the World account cautions that some of the subspecies were described from very small samples and may reflect individual, not subspecific, variation. It singles out P. m. inca as "doubtfully valid".

== Description ==
Males of the maroon-chested ground dove are 18 to 24 cm (7.1 to 9.4 in) long and females 19 to 22 cm (7.5 to 8.7 in). Both sexes weigh between 89 and 95 g (3.1 and 3.4 oz). The adult male's forehead, face, and chin are grayish white. Its breast is dark purple changing to gray on the belly and vent. Its upperparts and wings are blue-gray, with the folded wing showing two broad dark bars. The central tail feathers are gray, the outermost white, and those between grayish white. Its orange eye is surrounded by bare yellow skin. The adult female is brown overall with a cinnamon face; the darker wing bars are not as distinct. The juvenile is similar to the adult female but redder. The putative subspecies differ slightly in their coloration.

== Distribution and habitat ==
The maroon-chested ground dove is found discontinuously from southeastern Mexico to Peru and Bolivia. The subspecies are described as distributed thus:

- P. m. ochoterena, southeastern Mexico from Veracruz south to southern Chiapas
- P. m. salvini, Guatemala, El Salvador, and Honduras
- P. m. umbrina, Costa Rica
- P. m. pulchra, western Panama
- P. m. mondetoura, northern and western Venezuela, Colombia, and eastern Ecuador
- P. m. inca, Peru and west central Bolivia

The maroon-chested ground dove inhabits dense undergrowth in wet montane forest, its edges, and thickets of secondary forest. It is strongly associated with bamboo. In elevation it ranges between 1,200 and 2,500 m (3,900 and 8,200 ft) in Mexico, 900 and 3,000 m (3,000 and 9,800 ft) in Costa Rica, 1,000 and 2,100 m (3,300 and 6,900 ft) in Panama, and 1,300 and 2,600 m (4,300 and 8,500 ft) in the Andes.

== Behavior ==
=== Feeding ===
The maroon-chested ground dove forages on the ground for seeds and fallen fruit. Usually it forages alone or in pairs, but has been noted feeding in flocks of up to 15 birds. Bamboo seeds are a major component of its diet, and it will stay in an area only as long as its bamboo is seeding.

=== Breeding ===
Little is known about the maroon-chested ground dove's breeding phenology, but it is suspected to nest in loose colonies. The one described nest was a simple platform containing two eggs, placed in Chusquea bamboo in the mountains of southeastern Ecuador.

=== Vocalization ===
The maroon-chested ground dove's song is "a series of low-pitched, slightly rising bisyllable coos 'cuWOOP.....cuWOOP.....cuWOOP...'".

== Status ==
The IUCN has assessed the maroon-chested ground dove as being of Least Concern. However, it is considered uncommon to rare, and is "[p]robably in danger of decline if heavy deforestation continues throughout its range."
