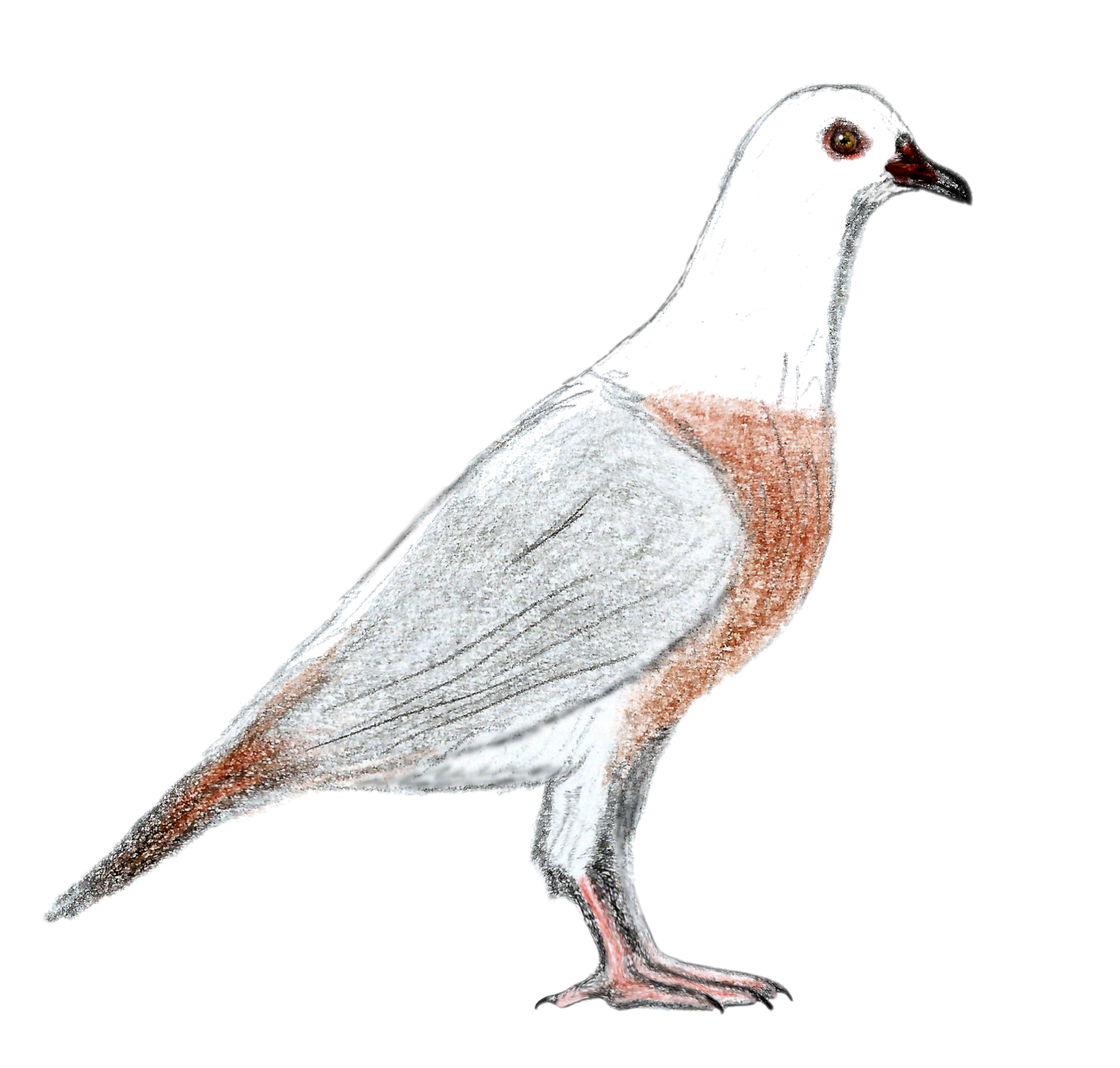

Conservation status
- Extinct

Scientific classification
- Kingdom: Animalia
- Phylum: Chordata
- Class: Aves
- Order: Columbiformes
- Family: Columbidae
- Genus: †Dysmoropelia; Olson, 1975
- Species: †D. dekarchiskos

Binomial name
- †Dysmoropelia dekarchiskos Olson, 1975
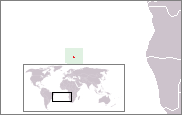
- Location of Saint Helena

= Saint Helena dove =

Saint Helena dove Temporal range: Late Pleistocene

Extinct species of bird

The Saint Helena dove (Dysmoropelia dekarchiskos) is an extinct species of flightless bird in the family Columbidae. It is monotypic within the genus Dysmoropelia. It was endemic to the island of Saint Helena in the South Atlantic Ocean. It is known from remains of Late Pleistocene (formerly considered to be Middle Pleistocene) age found at the Sugarloaf Hill locality, which consists of aeolian calcareous sands. The holotype consists of a right coracoid (USNM 175955), with paratypes consisting of "distal end of right tarsometatarsus (Ashmole No. 342), (S/1963.25.29) distal half of right humerus (Ashmole No. 337), (S/1963.25.26) worn left tibiotarsus lacking distal end (Kerr No. E4), (S/ 1963.25.27) distal portion of shaft of left tarsometatarsus (Kerr No. E3), (S/1963.25.30) worn proximal end of right humerus. (USNM 175956) left ulna, (175957 and 175958) proximal fragments of left ulnae, (175959) proximal end of right femur, (175962) distal end of right humerus"

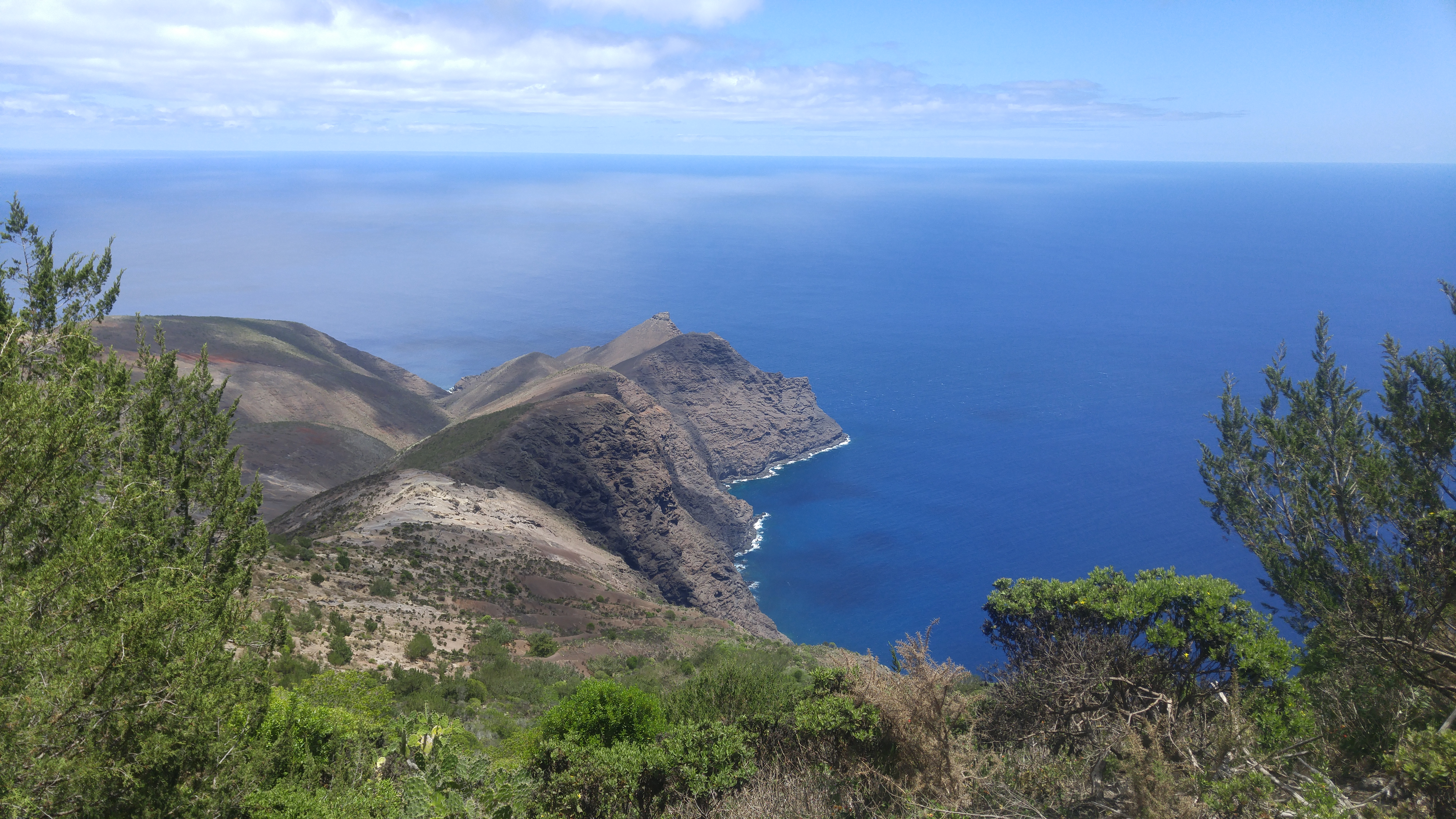
Sugar Loaf Point viewed from Flagstaff Hill, near holotype locality site.

It was a fairly large bird with short wings relative to body size and robust legs, with among the most extreme morphological adaptions of flightless columbids, akin to that of the dodo, Rodrigues solitaire and Viti Levu giant pigeon. It was presumed to have been hunted to extinction soon after the island's discovery in 1502. However, no accounts of the bird exist (Introductions were made very early on in the history of Saint Helena, and the accounts are therefore less useful) and Lewis (2008) suggests the bird became extinct prior to or during the Last Glacial Maximum. It has been suggested on morphological grounds that it is most closely related to Streptopelia turtle doves.
