= Rupephaps =

Rupephaps Temporal range: Late Early Miocene 19–16 Ma

Scientific classification
- Kingdom: Animalia
- Phylum: Chordata
- Class: Aves
- Order: Columbiformes
- Family: Columbidae
- Genus: †Rupephaps; Worthy et al., 2009
- Species: †R. taketake

Binomial name
- †Rupephaps taketake Worthy et al., 2009

Extinct species of bird

Rupephaps taketake, also referred to as the Saint Bathans pigeon, is an extinct species of pigeon from the Miocene of New Zealand. It is the first species of columbid to be described from pre-Pliocene fossil deposits in the Australasian region.

== Description ==
The pigeon was described from fossil material (a left coracoid) collected in 2008 from the Saint Bathans Fauna, above the base of the Bannockburn Formation, by the Manuherikia River in the Central Otago region of the South Island. It was a large pigeon, most similar to, and apparently most closely related to, the clade containing Hemiphaga, Lopholaimus and Gymnophaps, especially the former.

== Etymology ==
The genus name Rupephaps comes from Rupe (a widespread Polynesian word for “pigeon” which is also an honorific for the New Zealand pigeon in Māori mythology), with the Greek phaps (“pigeon”). The specific epithet ”taketake” is Māori for “long established”, “ancient” or “original”, referring to the age of the fossil specimen.
