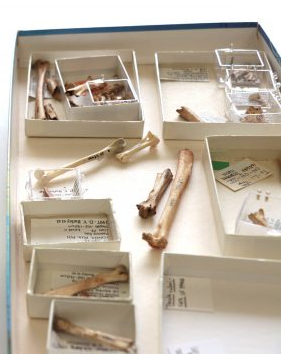
- Subfossil remains

Scientific classification
- Kingdom: Animalia
- Phylum: Chordata
- Class: Aves
- Order: Columbiformes
- Family: Columbidae
- Genus: †Tongoenas; Steadman & Takano, 2020
- Species: †T. burleyi

Binomial name
- †Tongoenas burleyi Steadman & Takano, 2020

= Tongoenas =

Tongoenas Temporal range: Late Pleistocene-Holocene, 0.06–0.00258 Ma

Extinct genus of giant pigeon from Tonga

Tongoenas, also known as the Tongan giant pigeon, is an extinct genus of giant pigeon that grew up to 51 centimetres (20 in) long that was once native to the islands of Tonga. It had existed as a genus for at least 60,000 years, and went extinct around 850–600 BCE. The type species and only known species, T. burleyi, was named in 2020 based on subfossil remains.

== Description ==
The only known Tongoenas specimens were found in a cave, which preserved subfossil remains. The large bird was thought to have been hunted and consumed by early human settlers, when they reached the Pacific Islands. It is known from Foa, Lifuka, `Uiha, Ha`afeva, Tongatapu, and `Eua. The research team, while exploring the island, noticed the trees on the island were larger than assumed, bearing exceedingly-large fruits. Lead author David W. Steadman states:

Some of these trees have big, fleshy fruit, clearly adapted for a big pigeon to gulp whole and pass the seeds,

— D. Steadman

And;

Of the fruit-eating pigeons, this bird is the largest and could have gulped bigger canopy fruit than any others. It takes co-evolution to the extreme

— Steadman

Tongoenas was able to gulp fruits as large as a standard-sized tennis ball. It was considered osteologically comparable to Ducula, Gymnophaps, and Hemiphaga.

== Paleoecology ==
Tongoenas had the ability to take flight, and lived high in the canopies, and is the largest known volant columbid aside from living Goura species. Tongoenas went extinct when humans reached the Pacific Islands. Since Tongoenas co-evolved with guava, mango and the chinaberry lineages, Tongoenas served as a crucial seed disperser, alongside an extinct Ducula species, Ducula shutleri.

== Extinction ==
Since Tongoenas was eaten by the humans who settled on 'Eua, it is likely that Tongoenas was hunted to extinction by ancient humans who had settled there. Tongoenas faced extinction around 850–600 BCE.
