= Arenicolumba =

Arenicolumba prattae Temporal range: Early Miocene 19–18 Ma

Scientific classification
- Kingdom: Animalia
- Phylum: Chordata
- Class: Aves
- Order: Columbiformes
- Family: Columbidae
- Genus: †Arenicolumba; Steadman, 2008
- Species: †A. prattae

Binomial name
- †Arenicolumba prattae (Becker & Brodkorb, 1992)

Synonyms
- Columbina prattae Becker & Brodkorb, 1992

Extinct genus of bird

Arenicolumba prattae is an extinct species of small pigeon from the Miocene of Florida. It was described from fossil material (a left coracoid) collected at the Thomas Farm Site in Gilchrist County, northern Florida, south-eastern United States. The genus name Arenicolumba comes from the Latin arena ("sandy place") with reference to the sandy, fossiliferous sediments of the collection site, and columba ("pigeon"). Originally described in 1992 as Columbina prattae, it was moved to the new genus in 2008.
