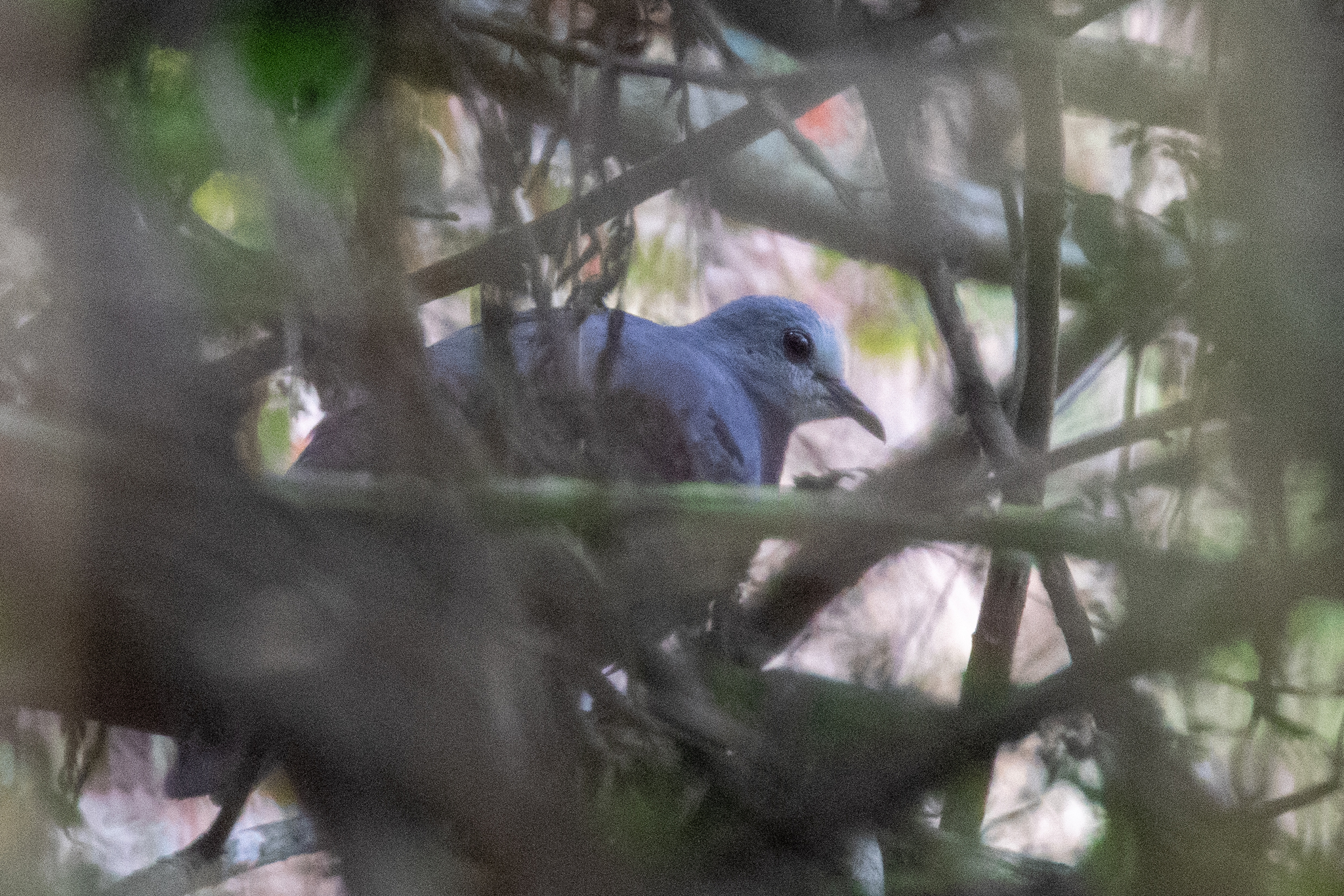

Scientific classification
- Kingdom: Animalia
- Phylum: Chordata
- Class: Aves
- Order: Columbiformes
- Family: Columbidae
- Subfamily: Claravinae
- Genus: Paraclaravis; Sangster, Sweet & Johnson, 2018

Species
- see text

= Paraclaravis =

Genus of birds

Paraclaravis is a genus that contains two species of doves that live in the Neotropics, with ranges in Middle America and South America. Paraclaravis doves have red eyes and pink legs, and the plumages of the males are primarily light grey-blue, and the females are primarily brown. Both sexes have a series of distinctive spots or bands on the wings. They are fairly arboreal for ground doves. Paraclaravis doves have a distinct fast and rocking flight pattern. They are found alone, in pairs or in small flocks in forests. Both species are generally local and rare, and appears to be associated with flowering bamboo.

The genus contains two species, which were formerly included with the blue ground dove in the genus Claravis:

Genus Paraclaravis – Sangster, Sweet & Johnson, 2018 – two species
| Common name | Scientific name and subspecies | Range | Size and ecology | IUCN status and estimated population |
|---|---|---|---|---|
| Maroon-chested ground dove | Paraclaravis mondetoura (Bonaparte, 1856) Six subspecies: P. m. ochoterena van Rossem (1934); P. m. salvini Griscom (1930); P. m. umbrina Griscom (1930); P. m. pulchra Griscom (1930); P. m. mondetoura Bonaparte (1856); P. m. inca van Rossem (1934) | Bolivia, Colombia, Costa Rica, Ecuador, El Salvador, Guatemala, Honduras, Mexico, Panama, Peru, and Venezuela | Size: Habitat: Diet: | LC |
| Purple-winged ground dove | Paraclaravis geoffroyi (Temminck, 1811) | south-eastern Brazil, far eastern Paraguay, and northern-eastern Argentina (Misiones only) | Size: Habitat: Diet: | CR |
