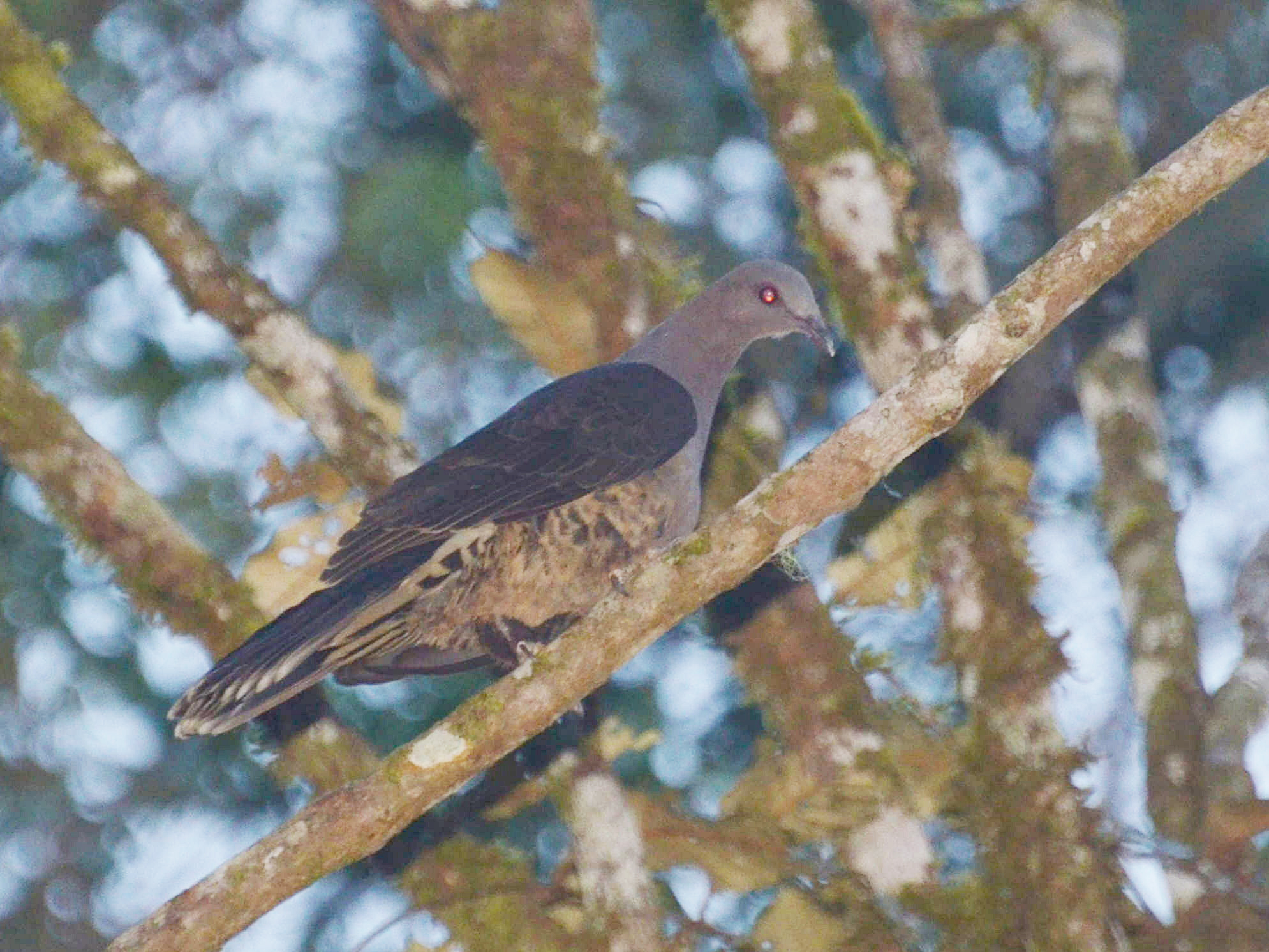

Conservation status
- Least Concern (IUCN 3.1)

Scientific classification
- Kingdom: Animalia
- Phylum: Chordata
- Class: Aves
- Order: Columbiformes
- Family: Columbidae
- Genus: Cryptophaps; Salvadori, 1893
- Species: C. poecilorrhoa

Binomial name
- Cryptophaps poecilorrhoa (Brüggemann, 1876)
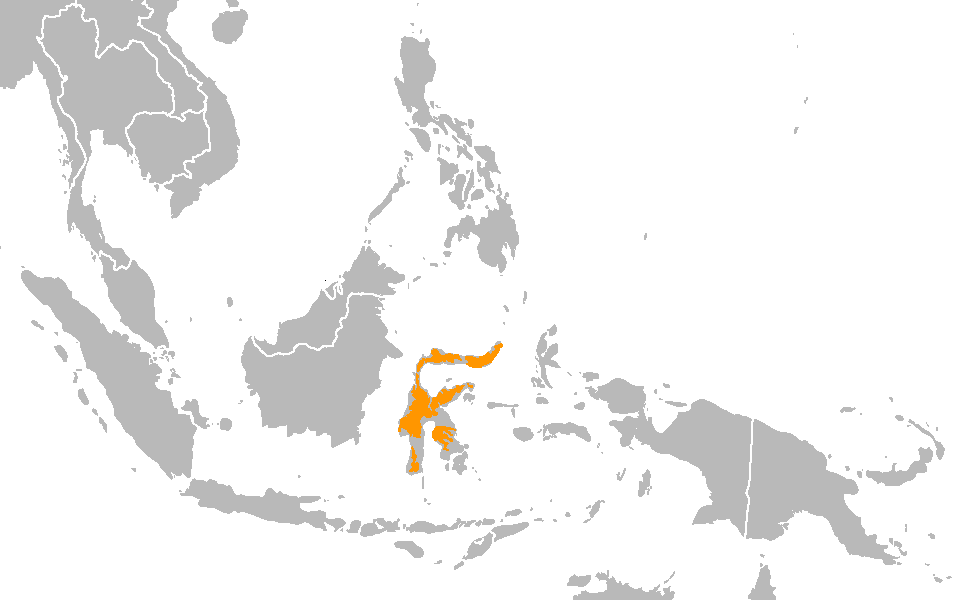
- Range map

= Sombre pigeon =

Species of bird

Sombre Pigeon, couple in Sulawesi

The sombre pigeon (Cryptophaps poecilorrhoa) is a species of bird in the family Columbidae. It is the only species within the genus Cryptophaps. It is endemic to the Indonesian island of Sulawesi in Wallacea. Its natural habitat is subtropical or tropical moist montane forests.
