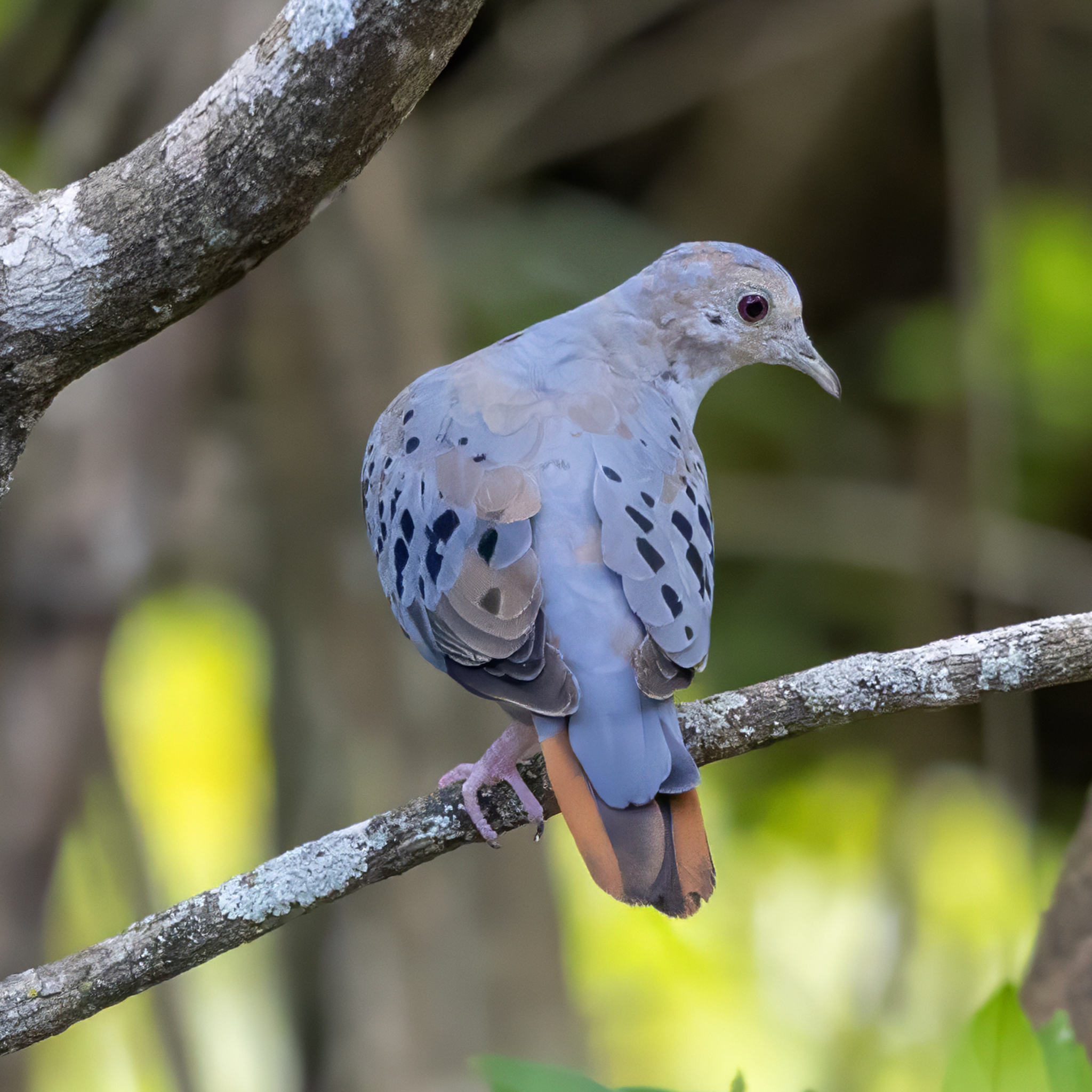
- male
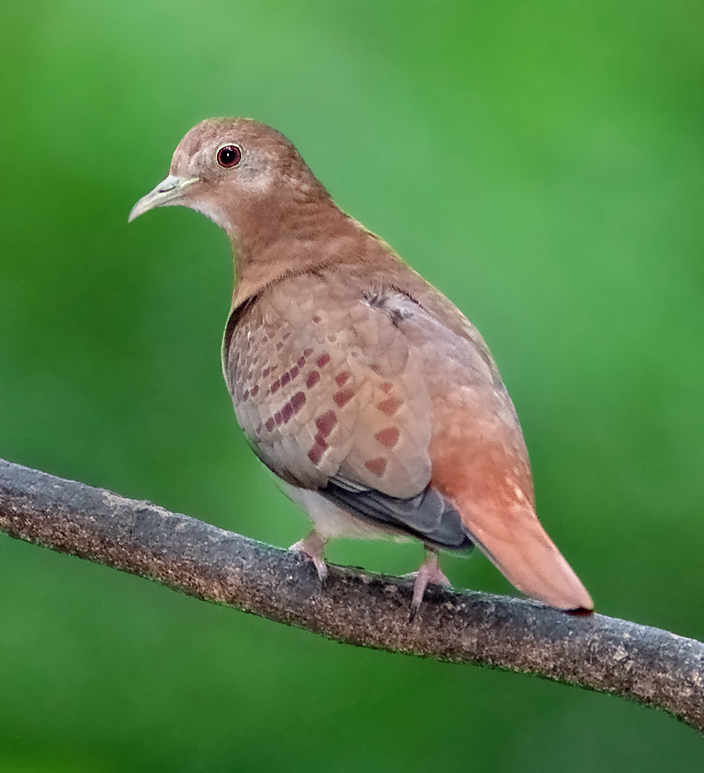
- female

Conservation status
- Least Concern (IUCN 3.1)

Scientific classification
- Kingdom: Animalia
- Phylum: Chordata
- Class: Aves
- Order: Columbiformes
- Family: Columbidae
- Subfamily: Claravinae
- Genus: Claravis; Oberholser, 1899
- Species: C. pretiosa

Binomial name
- Claravis pretiosa (Ferrari-Pérez, 1886)

= Blue ground dove =

Species of bird

The blue ground dove (Claravis pretiosa) is a small New World tropical dove. It is a resident breeder from southeastern Mexico to northwestern Peru and northern Argentina, and on Trinidad in the Caribbean.

== Habitat and breeding ==
The blue ground dove is relatively common in open woodland, forest edges, clearings and roadsides, especially in more humid areas. It is found from sea level to about 1200 m altitude. It builds a flimsy dish nest of twigs 1–11 m high in a tree and lays two white eggs.

== Description ==
Blue ground doves are small pigeons, 20 cm long with a weight of 65–72 g. Adult males have blue-grey upperparts and paler grey underparts, becoming grey-white on the face. The flight feathers and outer tail feathers are blackish, and the wings are boldly spotted black (these spots often forming distinct bands). The iris is red or yellow, the bare eyering is green, and the legs are flesh-pink. The female has a grey-brown head neck and breast, becoming pale blue-grey on the underwings and belly. The back is ruddy brown, contrasting with the chestnut rump and tail. The spots in the wings are chestnut-brown. Young birds resemble the female, but have ruddy scaling on the back.

In most of its range, the male is unlikely to be confused with other species, but can locally be confused with the members of the genus Paraclaravis. The female also resembles the females of the members of the genus Paraclaravis, but at most localities it is more likely to be confused with the female ruddy ground dove, which is smaller and has blackish (not chestnut-brown) markings on the wings. In most regions where the blue ground dove occurs, a blue-grey and a brown bird flying through the trees together is bound to be this species.

== Diet and behaviour ==
Blue ground doves occur singly, in pairs or sometimes in small groups. They feed mainly on the ground on seeds and small insects, and take grit. The male's song, given from the treetops, is a loud boop.

== Taxonomy ==
The genus Claravis was introduced in 1899 by the American ornithologist Harry C. Oberholser with the blue ground dove as the type species. The genus name combines the Latin clarus meaning "distinct" or "clear" with avis meaning "bird". Claravis formerly included the maroon-chested ground dove and purple-winged ground dove in addition to the blue ground dove, but the former two species were reassigned to the genus Paraclaravis due to the finding that the traditional Claravis was non-monophyletic. A study carried out using sequences of four mitochondrial genes and one nuclear gene, that included representatives from 15 of the 17 species in the group, recovered blue ground dove to be the clade with high support.
