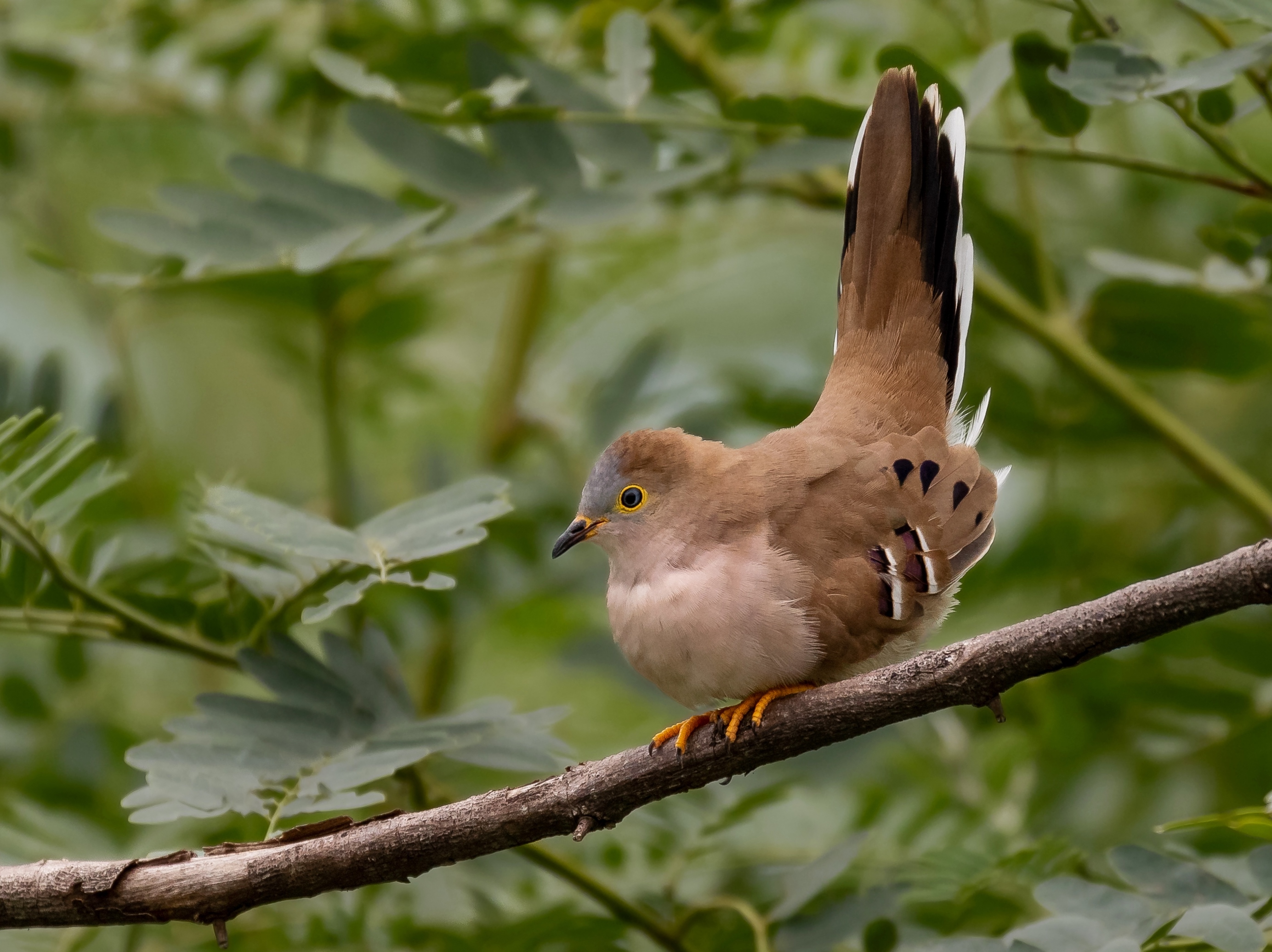

Conservation status
- Least Concern (IUCN 3.1)

Scientific classification
- Kingdom: Animalia
- Phylum: Chordata
- Class: Aves
- Order: Columbiformes
- Family: Columbidae
- Subfamily: Claravinae
- Genus: Uropelia; Bonaparte, 1855
- Species: U. campestris

Binomial name
- Uropelia campestris (Spix, 1825)

= Long-tailed ground dove =

Species of bird

The long-tailed ground dove (Uropelia campestris) is a species of bird in the dove and pigeon family, Columbidae. It is found in Bolivia and Brazil.

== Taxonomy and systematics ==
The long-tailed ground dove is the only member of its genus. It shares characteristics with both Columbina and Claravis doves but cannot be placed definitively in either. It is monotypic according to the International Ornithological Committee (IOC) and Clements taxonomies, but the Handbook of the Birds of the World adds subspecies U. c. figginsi to the nominate.

== Description ==
The long-tailed ground dove is 15.7 to 17.7 cm (6.2 to 7.0 in) long. The adult male's forehead and crown are bluish gray. Its upperparts are brown with a pinkish tinge on the hindneck. The folded wing shows two iridescent purple bands and a row of large purplish black spots. The throat and breast are pinkish mauve fading to white on the belly. The long tail's central feathers are brown and the outer ones black with white tips. The eye is gray to blue surrounded by bare yellow to orange skin. The adult female's eye surround is paler than the male's; its underparts are paler pink, its hindneck and shoulders more olive-brown, and the rest of the upperparts an ashier gray. Juveniles are duller and more grayish brown overall, and the bands and spots on the wings are chestnut and buff.

== Distribution and habitat ==
The long-tailed ground dove is found discontinuously in much of central Brazil and adjoining Bolivia. It inhabits drier (but seasonally wet) grassland, savanna, woodland edges, and scrubby parkland, usually near watercourses. In elevation it ranges from near sea level to 1,100 m (3,600 ft).

== Behavior ==
=== Feeding ===
The long-tailed ground dove forages in pairs or small groups, taking a wide variety of seeds from the ground.

=== Breeding ===
Nothing is known about the long-tailed ground dove's breeding phenology.

=== Vocalization ===
The long-tailed ground dove's song is a "series of rather high-pitched, disyllabic 'wha-ooop...wha-ooop...wha-ooop...' notes".

== Status ==
The IUCN has assessed the long-tailed ground dove as being of Least Concern. It appears to be locally common in much of its range, but "habitat destruction and modification may represent significant threats".
