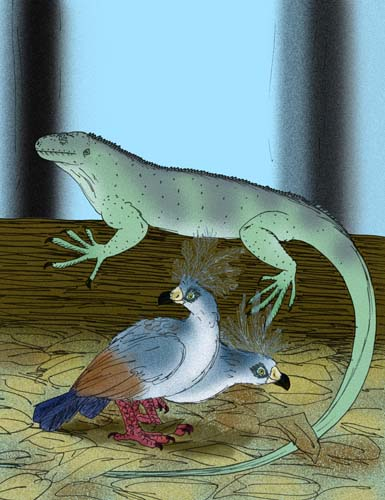
- N. gigoura and Lapitiguana

Scientific classification
- Kingdom: Animalia
- Phylum: Chordata
- Class: Aves
- Order: Columbiformes
- Family: Columbidae
- Genus: †Natunaornis; T. H. Worthy, 2001
- Species: †N. gigoura

Binomial name
- †Natunaornis gigoura T. H. Worthy, 2001
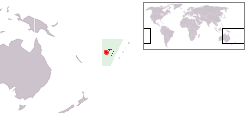
- Former range (in red)

= Viti Levu giant pigeon =

Viti Levu giant pigeon Temporal range: Holocene

Extinct species of bird

The Viti Levu giant pigeon or Fiji giant ground pigeon (Natunaornis gigoura) is an extinct flightless pigeon of Viti Levu, the largest island in Fiji. It was only slightly smaller than the dodo (Raphus cucullatus) and Rodrigues solitaire (Pezophaps solitaria) and is the first giant flightless pigeon to be discovered on a Pacific island.

Remains of this species were discovered in Quaternary (probably Holocene) cave deposits in October 1998 and November 1999. Its first description was published in 2001. The holotype is in the collection of the Museum of New Zealand Te Papa Tongarewa. It is known from the holotype tarsometatarsus and paratypes including various parts of the wings and legs. No parts of the skull are known apart from a possible referred premaxilla (MNZ S37306).

The generic name "Natunaornis" is named after Natuna, the oldest chief of the Volivoli people in the Sigatoka Valley, wherein the fossil bones of the type species were first found. The specific name reflects both the large size of this fossil species and its proposed affinities to the crowned pigeons of genus Goura.

== See also ==
- Late Quaternary prehistoric birds
- Island gigantism
