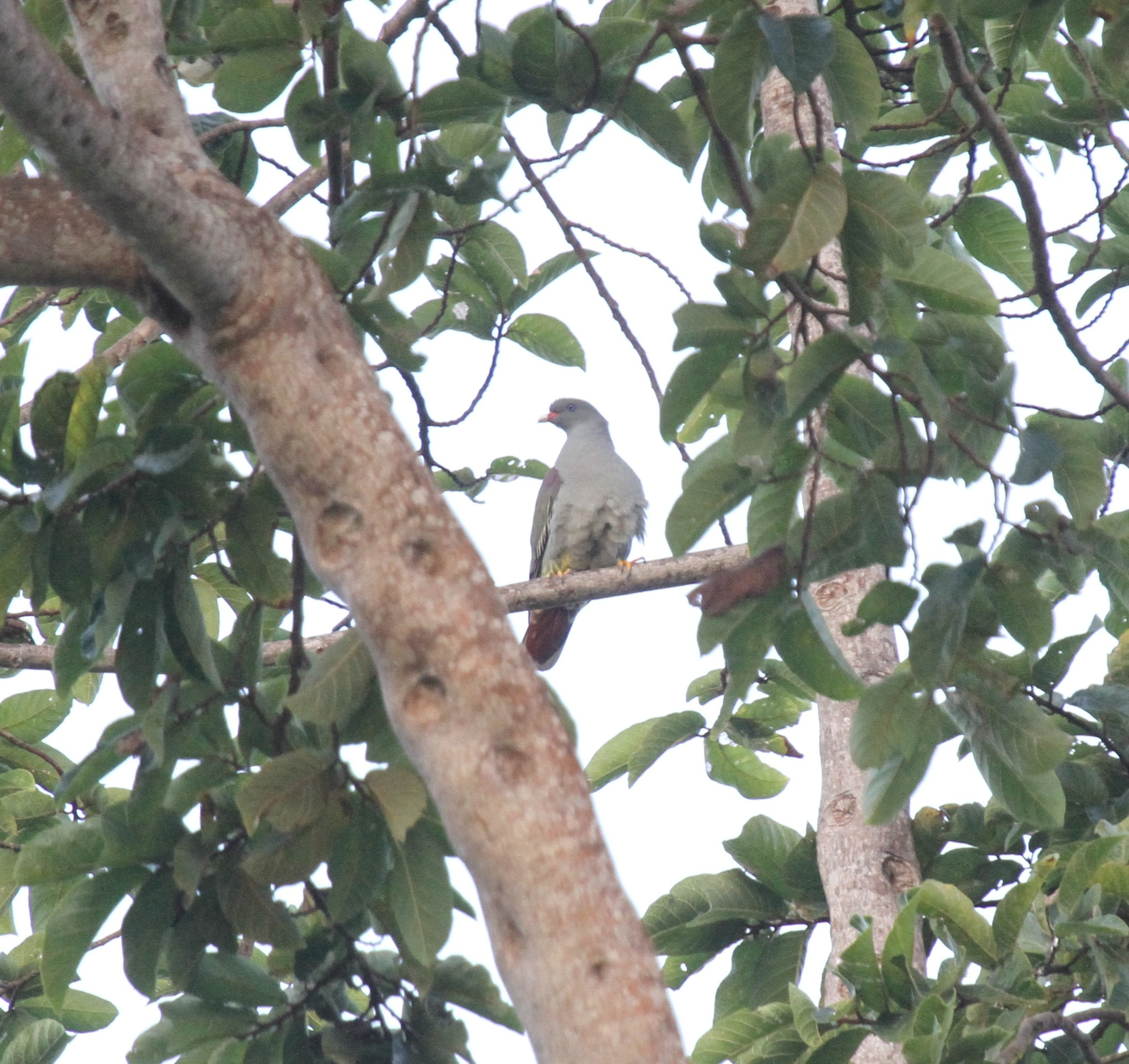

Conservation status
- Vulnerable (IUCN 3.1)

Scientific classification
- Kingdom: Animalia
- Phylum: Chordata
- Class: Aves
- Order: Columbiformes
- Family: Columbidae
- Genus: Treron
- Species: T. pembaensis

Binomial name
- Treron pembaensis Pakenham, 1940

= Pemba green pigeon =

Species of bird

The Pemba green pigeon (Treron pembaensis) is a species of bird in the family Columbidae. It is a small and stocky pigeon, with an average length of 25 cm. The head, neck, breast, and underparts are greenish-grey, while the upperparts from the lower mantle to the rump are olive-green, brighter on the rump and uppertail-coverts and with a greyish wash elsewhere. There is a dark greyish-purple patch on the shoulder formed by the lesser wing-coverts. It is endemic to Pemba Island, off the northeastern coast of mainland Tanzania. It is most common in primary forest, but also occurs in secondary forest, gardens, and clove plantations. Its population is estimated to number 2,000–3,200 mature individuals, although some estimates are as low as 500.

== Taxonomy ==
Sometimes treated as a subspecies of the Madagascar green pigeon or African green pigeon. Based on the colour of its cere, it is likely most closely to those two species and the São Tomé green pigeon.

== Description ==
The Pemba green pigeon is a small and stocky pigeon, with an average length of 25 cm. The head, neck, breast, and underparts are greenish-grey, while the upperparts from the lower mantle to the rump are olive-green, brighter on the rump and uppertail-coverts and with a greyish wash elsewhere. There is a dark greyish-purple patch on the shoulder formed by the lesser wing-coverts. The yellowish edges to some of the greater wing-coverts also form a stripe when the wing is folded. The undertail is blackish with a wide grey band near the tip, while the underwing is blackish-grey. The feet and tarsi are orange-yellow. The bill and cere are dull red with a grey tip. The iris is bluish-grey with a red ring around it. Females are smaller and duller than males. The juvenile plumage is unknown, but juveniles are likely to be smaller and duller, with a smaller shoulder patch.

== Distribution and habitat ==
The pigeon is endemic to Pemba Island, off the northeastern coast of mainland Tanzania. It is most common in primary forest, but also occurs in secondary forest, gardens, and clove plantations. It prefers undisturbed woodlands and is most common in the two remaining native forests on the islands, Ngezi and Msitu Mkuu. It also ventures to coral islets near the islands.

== Ecology ==
The pigeon is largely sedentary, but makes local movements based on the availability of food and water. It is a retiring species due to the presence of hunting on the island. It is usually seen in pairs or small flocks.

Foraging is carried out by small flocks in the canopy of fruiting trees. It has been recorded feeding on mangos and Pterocarpus and is especially fond of betel palms and figs. Pemba green pigeons will occasionally descend to the ground to eat fallen fruit.

The Pemba green pigeon is known to breed from October to February, but probably also breeds outside of this period, with breeding males having been recorded in April and June. The nest is a flimsy platform made of twigs, usually made near the end of a branch, and is made by both sexes. Nests are so fragile they are often destroyed by wind. Pairs build two to three nests before laying one or two glossy white eggs.

== Status ==
The Pemba green pigeon is classified as being vulnerable on the IUCN Red List due to a rapid decline in its population caused by habitat loss and degradation. The species was formerly thought to be uncommon on the island, but is now considered to be rare and is restricted to wooded areas and coral islets. Its population is estimated to number 2,000–3,200 mature individuals, although some estimates are as low as 500.
