= Whistling green pigeon =

Whistling green pigeon has been split into the following species:

- Ryukyu green pigeon, Treron permagnus, endemic to Japan
- Taiwan green pigeon, Treron formosae, found in Taiwan and Bahanes
