= Comoro green pigeon =

Conservation status
- Endangered (IUCN 3.1)

Scientific classification
- Kingdom: Animalia
- Phylum: Chordata
- Class: Aves
- Order: Columbiformes
- Family: Columbidae
- Genus: Treron
- Species: T. griveaudi

Binomial name
- Treron griveaudi Benson, 1960

Species of bird

The Comoro green pigeon (Treron griveaudi) is a bird in the family Columbidae. It was previously thought to be conspecific with the Madagascar green pigeon (Treron australis).

== Geographic Range ==
Treron griveaudi is currently known only from the island of Mwali in the Comoros, although it is considered likely that it was present on Ngazidja and Nzwani in the past.

== Habitat ==
The Comoro green pigeon is found in evergreen forest, secondary forest and coconut plantations at higher elevations.

== Conservation ==
Despite being legally protected, poaching is still suspected. Suitable forest only remains on 5% of the island and introduced species such as rats may predate nests. The population is thought to number fewer than 2,500 mature individuals.
