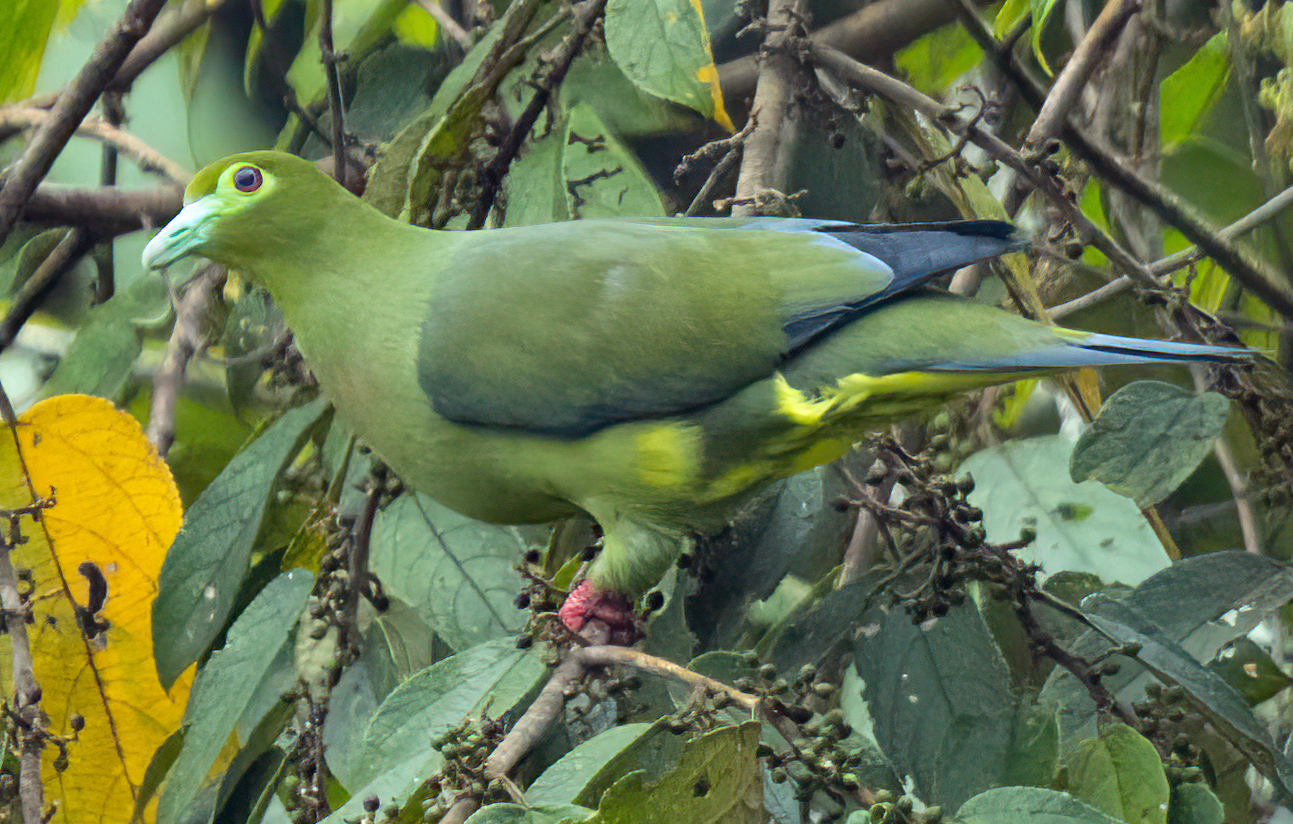

Conservation status
- Near Threatened (IUCN 3.1)

Scientific classification
- Kingdom: Animalia
- Phylum: Chordata
- Class: Aves
- Order: Columbiformes
- Family: Columbidae
- Genus: Treron
- Species: T. oxyurus

Binomial name
- Treron oxyurus (Temminck, 1823)

Synonyms
- List: Treron oxyura (Temminck, 1823); Columba oxyura Temminck, 1823; Vinago oxyura (Temminck, 1823); Sphenocercus oxyura (Temminck, 1823); Sphenocercus oxyurus (Temminck, 1823); Sphenura semitorquatus Swainson, 1837; Sphenura oxyura (Temminck, 1823)

= Sumatran green pigeon =

Species of bird

The Sumatran green pigeon (Treron oxyurus) is a species of bird in the pigeon family, Columbidae. First described by the Dutch zoologist Coenraad Jacob Temminck in 1823, it is endemic to Indonesia, where it is found in Sumatra and western Java. It inhabits the canopy of dense hill and montane forest and has been recorded at elevations of 350 to 1,800 m (1,100 to 5,900 ft) on Sumatra and 600 to 3,000 m (2,000 to 9,800 ft) on Java. The Sumatran green pigeon is a relatively slender species with a long wedge-shaped tail and an adult length of 29.0–34.1 cm (11.4–13.4 in) in males and 27.7–29.0 cm (10.9–11.4 in) in females. Adult males have a dark green head and body, bright yellow lower belly and undertail-coverts, dark grey tail, and bluish-green unfeathered patches on the face. Adult females are duller and have no grey on the back of the neck, a fainter orange wash on the breast, and no orange markings on the crown or the bend of the wing.

The species feeds on fruit such as figs, leaving overnight roosts of up to 50 birds to feed in the early morning and returning in the late afternoon. Breeding has been observed in January and September on Sumatra and in June on Java. Nests are built in trees and contain one or two eggs incubated by both parents. The Sumatran green pigeon is listed as near-threatened on the IUCN Red List due to a "moderately small" population that is continuing to decline because of habitat degradation. It was previously considered to be locally common throughout its range, but is now scarce on Sumatra and very rare on Java. It is threatened by habitat loss and the wildlife trade.

== Taxonomy ==
The Sumatran green pigeon was originally described as Columba oxyura by the Dutch zoologist Coenraad Jacob Temminck in 1823 based on specimens from Java. It was subsequently placed by different authors in several different genera, including Columba, Treron, and Vinago. In 1837, the British naturalist William Swainson erected the new genus Sphenurus for the Sumatran green pigeon, which he referred to as Sphenurus semitorquatus. The English ornithologist George Robert Gray also created a new genus, Sphenocercus, for the species in 1840. In the 1930s, the American ornithologist James Lee Peters synonymised all genera of fruit pigeons other than Spenurus, Butreron, and Treron, placing the Sumatran green-pigeon in the first. The Indian ornithologist Biswamoy Biswas further merged Spenurus and Butreron into Treron in a 1950 paper, disagreeing with Peters on the importance of anatomical traits in differentiating the genera. This placement of the Sumatran green pigeon in Treron has been followed by subsequent checklists.

The generic name Treron is derived from trērōn (τρήρων), an Ancient Greek word meaning 'pigeon' or 'dove'. The specific name oxyurus is from the Ancient Greek words oxus and -ouros, meaning 'sharp-tail' or 'pointed-tail'. Sumatran green pigeon is the official common name designated by the International Ornithologists' Union. Other English common names for the species include yellow-bellied pin-tailed green pigeon, green-spectacled pigeon, and yellow-bellied green pigeon. In Indonesian, the species is known as Punai salung.

The Sumatran green pigeon is closely related to the wedge-tailed and yellow-vented green pigeons, with which it was formerly placed in the genus Sphenurus. These three species may form a link between the African Treron species and the remaining Asian members of the genus.

== Description ==
The Sumatran green pigeon is a relatively slender species with a long wedge-shaped tail. It has a length of 29.0–34.1 cm (11.4–13.4 in) in males and 27.7–29.0 cm (10.9–11.4 in) in females. The wing length is 159–170 mm (6.26–6.69 in) in males and 156–157 mm (6.14–6.18 in) in females, while tail length is 102–119 mm (4.02–4.69 in) across both sexes.

Adult males have a dark green head and body, bright yellow lower belly and undertail-coverts, dark grey tail, and unfeathered patches on the face. The forehead is bright olive, the crown and nape are dark green, and the neck, upper back, scapular feathers and lesser coverts are dark green, with the neck also having a grey wash. The outer greater coverts are blackish, the tertials are dark green, and the primaries and secondaries are black. The underside of the wing is dark grey. The chin and throat are greenish-yellow, the ear-coverts are bright olive, and the breast is bright olive with a rusty-orange tint. The vent and thighs are sulphur-yellow, the latter having dark green streaks on most feathers.

The undertail is black with a grey band near the tip. Shorter undertail-coverts have yellow outerwebs and dark green innerwebs, while the longer ones have yellowish-buff outerwebs and rufous innerwebs. The uppertail is dark grey. The central tail feathers are long and pointed, with an olive-green tint. The outer feathers have a black central band. The unfeathered lores and orbital skin are pale green to turquoise. The cere and base of the bill are turquoise to apple-green, while the tip is bluish-horn. The iris is pale purple to orange and has a blue inner ring, while the feet are pinkish-red.

Adult females are duller and have no grey on the back of the neck, a fainter orange wash on the breast, yellower undertail-coverts with dark streaks, and no orange markings on the crown or the bend of the wing. Juveniles are similar to females, but have paler grey-green edges to the median coverts and tips of the primaries, as well as more rounded tips to the central tail feathers. Recently fledged birds have paler orbital skin, bills, breasts, and undertail-coverts, as well as rounded central tail feathers. The base of the upper mandible is not electric-blue as in adults and the feathers near the base are poorly-formed.

The wedge-tailed green pigeon is similar to the Sumatran green pigeon and co-occurs with it throughout its range. It has more rounded, dull olive, grey-green-tipped central tail feathers, a black subterminal band, long undertail-coverts, feathered lores, and maroon lesser wing-coverts. On Java, male wedge-tailed green pigeons also have more orange breasts. Compared to the pin-tailed green pigeon, the Sumatran green pigeon is duller and darker in colouration, has a shorter, less pointed tail, has more extensive yellow area on belly and vent, lacks yellow on the wings, and has unfeathered bluish-green patches on the face.

=== Vocalisations ===
The variable song consists of rapid, rich whistles. It includes several characteristic even, two-syllable whistles, succeeded by a final upslurred or overslurred coo-wha or coo-whow. The call is a whistling coo-wok or coaa-cooa, with the second note rising in pitch.

== Distribution and habitat ==
The Sumatran green pigeon is endemic to Indonesia, where it is found in Sumatra and western Java. On Sumatra, it is found in the Barisan Mountains, as well as some other parts of the island, while on Java, it is found in the western mountains east to Mount Papandayan. It inhabits the canopy of dense hill and montane forest and has been recorded at elevations of 350 to 1,800 m (1,100 to 5,900 ft) on Sumatra and 600 to 3,000 m (2,000 to 9,800 ft) on Java. It is locally migratory, but never strays far from dense hill forest. Sumatran green pigeons have been seen in open coastal swamp forest near sea level in North Sumatra; these may have been visiting the lowlands to feed or may have been escaped captive birds.

== Ecology ==
The species feeds on fruit such as figs in foraging flocks. It roosts communally in flocks of up to 50 birds. Birds leave the overnight roost to feed in the early morning and return by the late afternoon. The Sumatran green pigeon is known to be parasitised by Columbicola feather lice. Its generation length is 4.2 years.

Breeding has been observed in January and September on Sumatra and in June on Java. Nests are built by both sexes, who bring twigs to construct the nest in the early morning. Nests have been documented from Syzygium aqueum, Syzygium aromaticum, and Casuarina trees at heights of 2.5–6 m (8–20 ft) above the ground. Nests contain one or two eggs, which are incubated by both parents.

== Conservation ==
The Sumatran green pigeon is listed as near-threatened on the IUCN Red List due to a "moderately small" population that is continuing to decline because of habitat degradation. It was previously considered to be locally common throughout its range, but is now scarce on Sumatra and very rare on Java. Forest loss due to logging and fires has been extensive in the pigeon's range, especially at lower elevations, leading to a patchy distribution. There are no population estimates for the species, but its population is thought to be declining at a moderate rate and it is now hard to find on both islands it inhabits. The continuing habitat loss may warrant a reassessment of the species's conservation status. The species has also been found in the wildlife trade; one bird was found being sold in Nagan Raya Regency, while over 300 were offered for sale in 2015 in Takengon, both in Aceh. It is found in several protected areas, including Mount Halimun Salak National Park on Java and Bukit Barisan Selatan National Park on Sumatra, as well as Mount Kerinci and Mount Sinabung on Sumatra. However, it is not currently protected under Indonesian law. Recommended conservation measures for the species include determining the size of its population, monitoring to determine population trends, investigating the extent of hunting, and protecting montane forest across the species's range.
