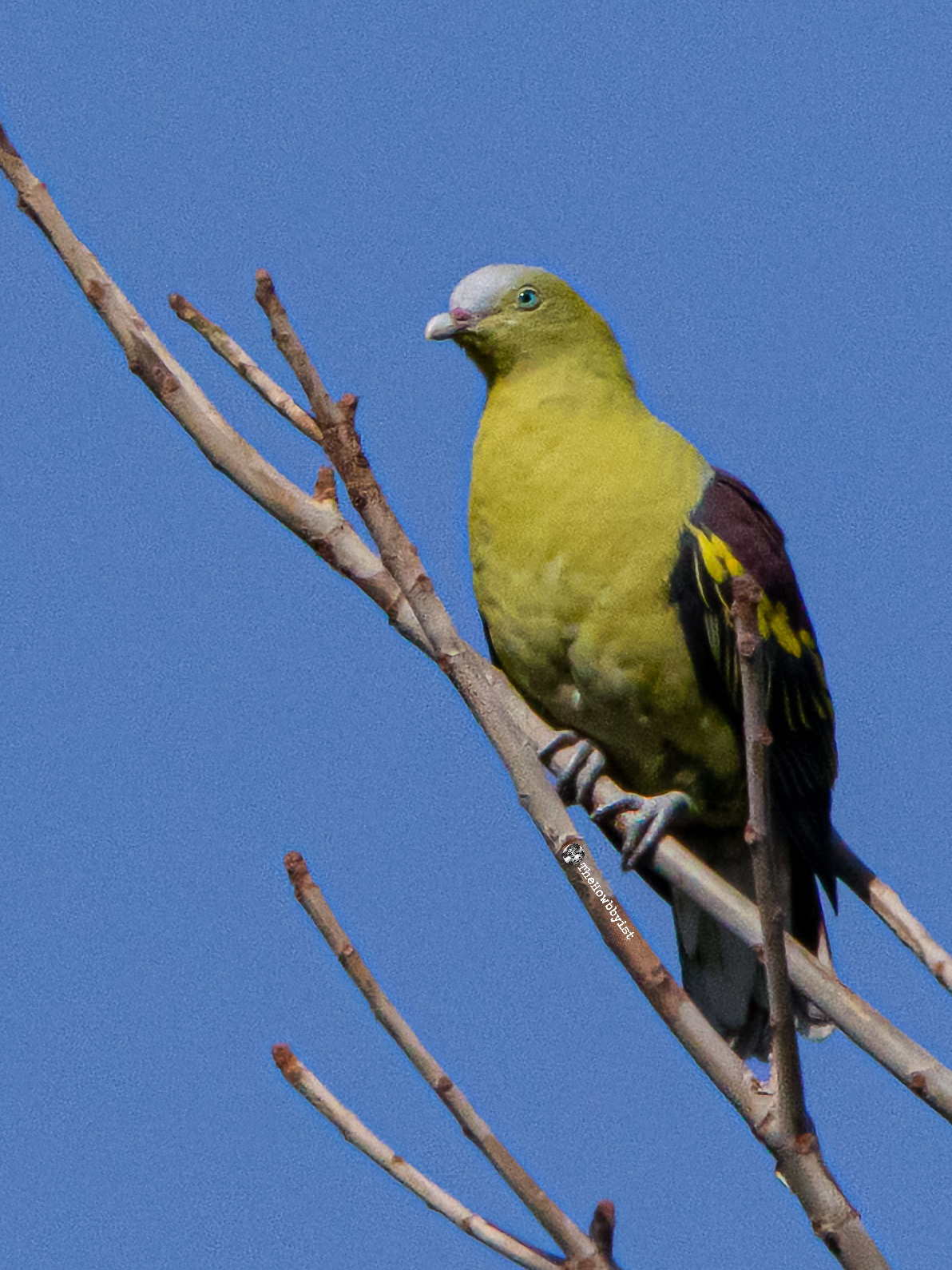

Conservation status
- Least Concern (IUCN 3.1)

Scientific classification
- Kingdom: Animalia
- Phylum: Chordata
- Class: Aves
- Order: Columbiformes
- Family: Columbidae
- Genus: Treron
- Species: T. axillaris

Binomial name
- Treron axillaris (Bonaparte, 1855)

= Philippine green pigeon =

Species of bird

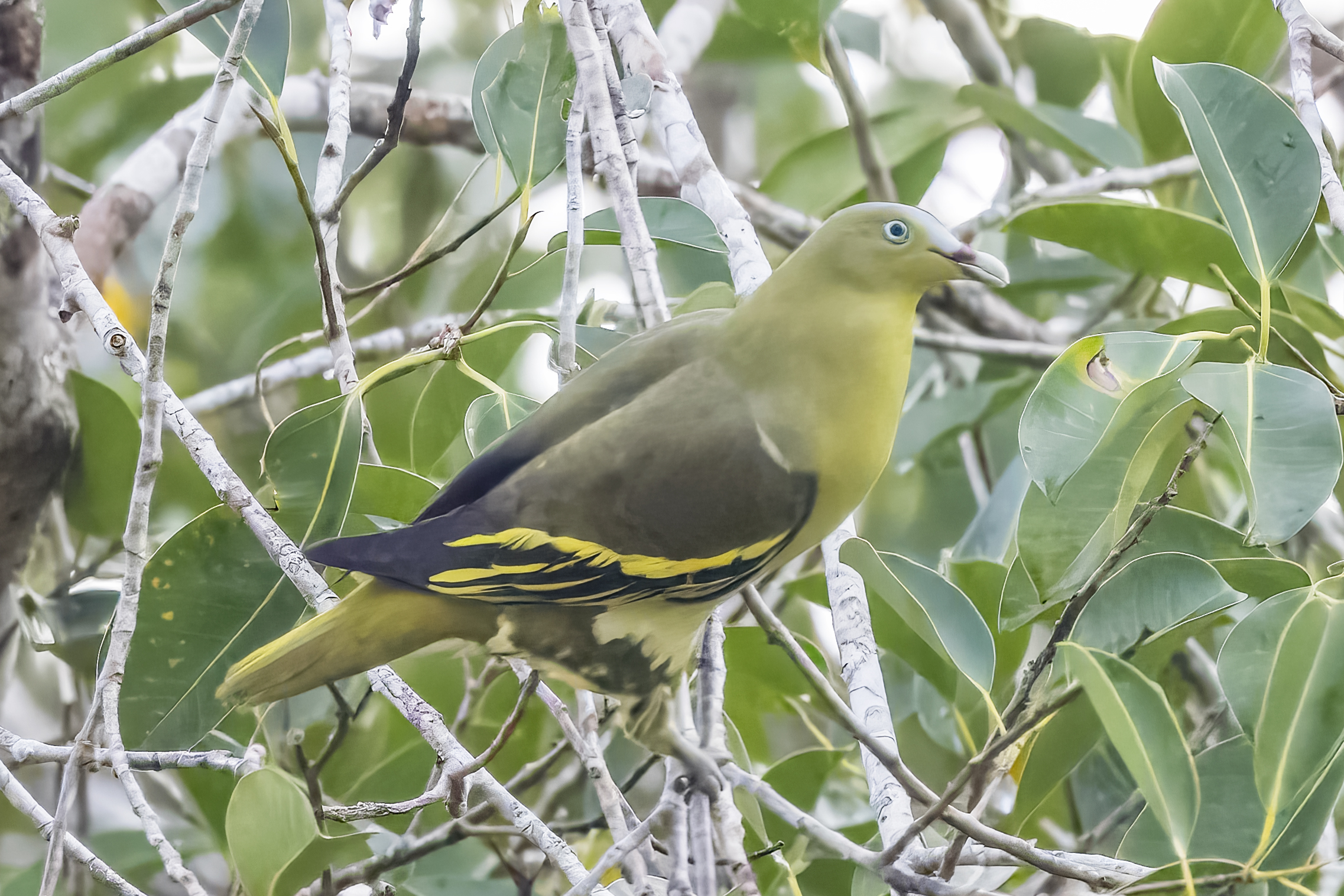
Female bird

The Philippine green pigeon (Treron axillaris) is a pigeon in the genus Treron. It is endemic to the Philippines where it lives in the tropical moist lowland forests. It is part of the pompadour green pigeon complex which it was once conspecific with.

== Description and taxonomy ==
Described on Ebird as "A medium-sized pigeon of lowland and foothill forest canopy, with green underparts, head, and rump, a gray crown, yellow wingbars and edges to the flight feathers, a whitish belly, and white under the base of the tail. Note the whitish bill with a reddish base and the blue eyes. Male has a maroon shoulder and back, where the female is green. Similar to Thick-billed Green-Pigeon, but Philippine has a thinner bill and lacks the green skin around the eye. Female resembles female Pink-necked Green-Pigeon, but that species has yellow marks only on the edge of the wing. Voice is typical of green-pigeons, including a rising-and-falling out-of-tune whistled song."

It was previously conspecific the Pompadour green pigeon species complex but is differentiated by the red cere on base of bill, larger bill, bluish-grey legs and feet, blackish-grey carpal area and white undertail-coverts.

=== Subspecies ===
Four subspecies are recognized.

- T. a. axillaris – Found on South Luzon, Catanduanes, Polillo Islands and Mindoro (and proximate islands)
- T. a. amadoni – Found on North Luzon; similar to nominate and poorly differentiated but darker and less well-defined grey cap, but no grey band between mantle and back
- T. a. canescens – Found on Visayas and Mindanao (and proximate islands); darker maroon mantle washed glaucous, pale grey band between mantle and back,
- T. a. everetti – Found on Sulu Archipelago; largest size with a clearly demarcated but smaller gray cap and gray band between hindneck and mantle

== Ecology and behavior ==
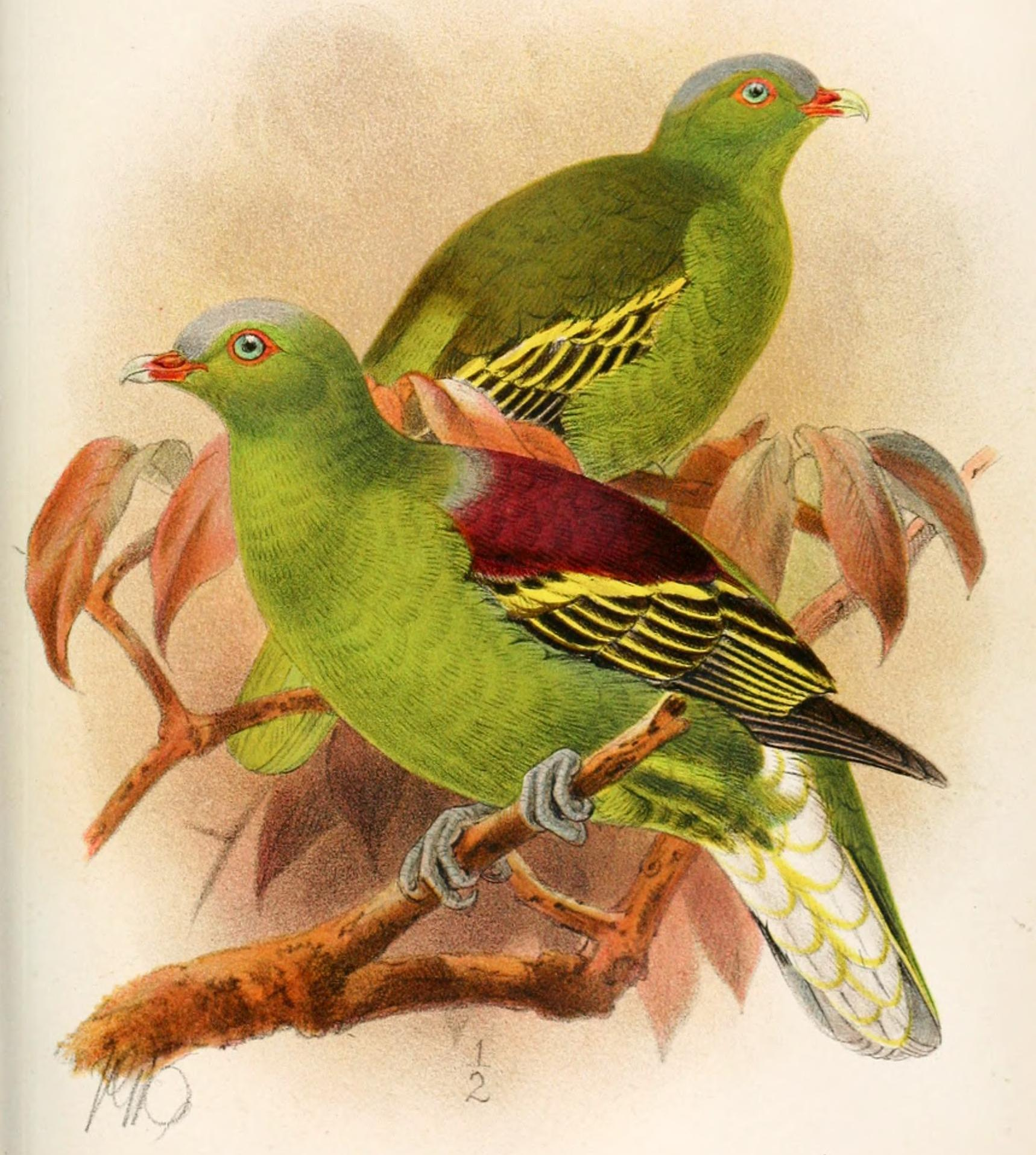
Catalogue of the Birds in the British Museum (1893 - 1893)

It is a frugivore.The Philippine green pigeon usually occurs singly or in small groups. Forms large flocks, even with other Pink-necked green pigeon to feed on fruiting trees. Its flight is fast and direct, with the regular beats and an occasional sharp flick of the wings that are characteristic of pigeons in general.

Breeding mainly occurs in May to June, which is generally the breeding time for Philippine forest birds. It builds a stick nest in a tree and lays two white eggs.

== Habitat and conservation status ==
Its natural habitat is moist tropical primary forest up to 1,000 meters above sea level.

The IUCN has classified the species as least concern with the population to be declining due to deforestation from land conversion, Illegal logging and slash-and-burn farming. This species also experiences hunting pressure for both meat and the pet trade. It is now probably extirpated on Cebu, while it is still reported on EBird it may be possibly misidentified Pink-necked green pigeon.

It is found in multiple protected areas such as Rajah Sikatuna Protected Landscape in Bohol and Samar Island Natural Park but actual protection and Mount Banahaw, Mount Makiling, Mount Isarog, Bataan National Park and Northern Sierra Madre Natural Park on Luzon but like all areas in the Philippines, protection is lax and deforestation and hunting continues despite this protection on paper.
