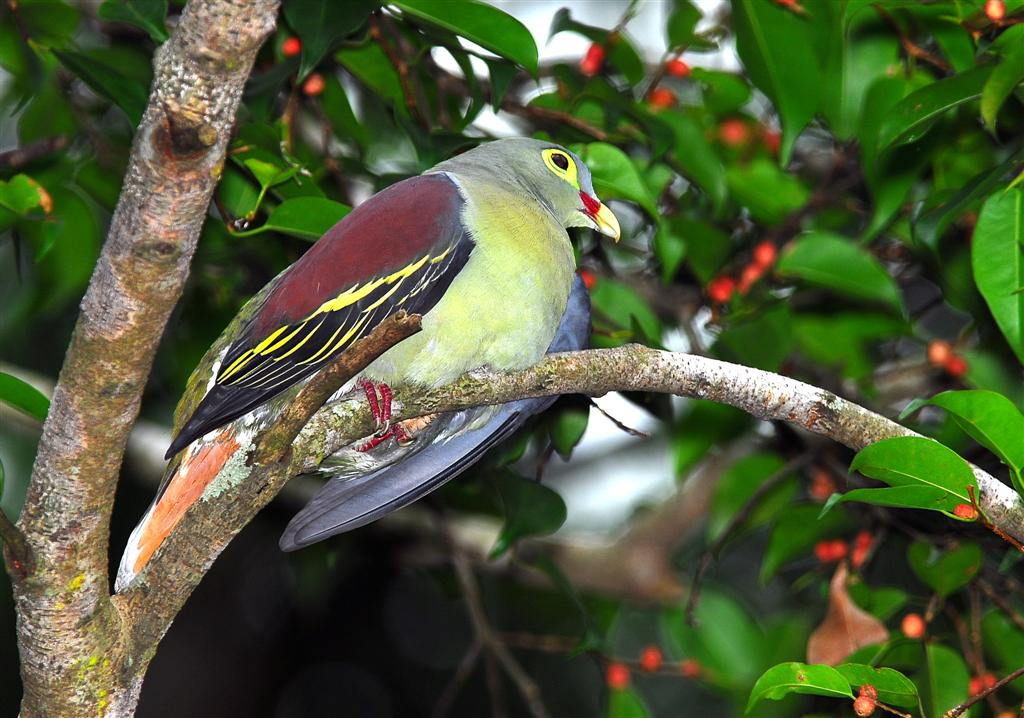
- male Thick-billed green pigeon

Scientific classification
- Kingdom: Animalia
- Phylum: Chordata
- Class: Aves
- Order: Columbiformes
- Family: Columbidae
- Subfamily: Raphinae
- Tribe: Treronini
- Genus: Treron; Vieillot, 1816

Type species
- Columba curvirostra Gmelin, 1789

Species
- (Total 30)See text

= Green pigeon =

Green pigeons

Genus of birds

Treron is a genus of bird in the pigeon family Columbidae. It contains 30 species distributed across Asia and Africa, they all are remarkable for their green plumage that lead to their common name green pigeons, which comes from a carotenoid pigment found in their diets of fruits in their wild habitats; other than that, they also eat various, nuts, and/or seeds.

Members of this genus can be further grouped into species with long tails, medium-length tails, and wedge-shaped tails. Most species of green pigeon display sexual dimorphism, where males and females can be readily distinguished by differences in their plumage. They dwell in trees and occupy a variety of wooded habitats.

== Taxonomy ==
The genus Treron was introduced in 1816 by the French ornithologist Louis Pierre Vieillot with the thick-billed green pigeon (Treron curvirostra) as the type species. The genus name is from the Ancient Greek τρηρων trērōn simply meaning "pigeon" or "dove".

The genus contains 30 species:

- Cinnamon-headed green pigeon (Treron fulvicollis)
- Little green pigeon (Treron olax)
- Pink-necked green pigeon (Treron vernans)
- Orange-breasted green pigeon (Treron bicinctus)
- Pompadour green pigeon complex:
  - Sri Lanka green pigeon (Treron pompadora)
  - Grey-fronted green pigeon (Treron affinis)
  - Ashy-headed green pigeon (Treron phayrei)
  - Andaman green pigeon (Treron chloropterus)
  - Philippine green pigeon (Treron axillaris)
  - Buru green pigeon (Treron aromaticus)
- Thick-billed green pigeon (Treron curvirostra)
- Grey-cheeked green pigeon (Treron griseicauda)
- Sumba green pigeon (Treron teysmannii)
- Flores green pigeon (Treron floris)
- Timor green pigeon (Treron psittaceus)
- Large green pigeon (Treron capellei)
- Yellow-footed green pigeon (Treron phoenicopterus)
- Bruce's green pigeon (Treron waalia)
- Madagascar green pigeon (Treron australis)
- Comoros green pigeon (Treron griveaudi)
- African green pigeon (Treron calvus)
- Pemba green pigeon (Treron pembaensis)
- São Tomé green pigeon (Treron sanctithomae)
- Pin-tailed green pigeon (Treron apicauda)
- Sumatran green pigeon (Treron oxyurus)
- Yellow-vented green pigeon (Treron seimundi)
- Wedge-tailed green pigeon (Treron sphenurus)
- White-bellied green pigeon (Treron sieboldii)
- Ryukyu green pigeon (Treron permagnus)
- Taiwan green pigeon (Treron formosae)
