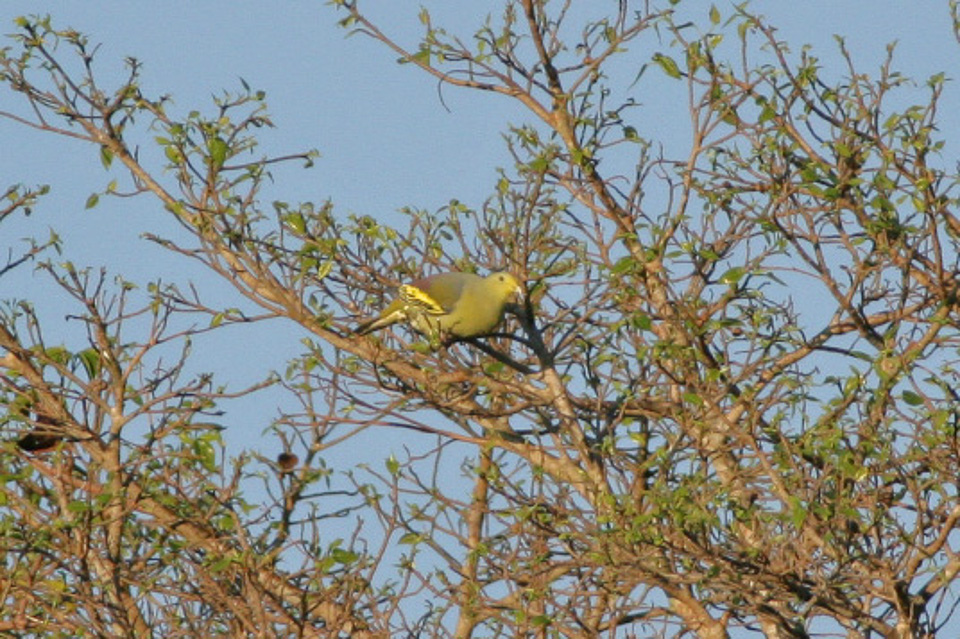

Conservation status
- Near Threatened (IUCN 3.1)

Scientific classification
- Kingdom: Animalia
- Phylum: Chordata
- Class: Aves
- Order: Columbiformes
- Family: Columbidae
- Genus: Treron
- Species: T. teysmannii

Binomial name
- Treron teysmannii Schlegel, 1879

= Sumba green pigeon =

Species of bird

The Sumba green pigeon (Treron teysmannii) is a species of bird in the family Columbidae. It is endemic to Sumba Island in Indonesia. Its natural habitat is subtropical or tropical moist lowland forests. It is threatened by habitat loss.
