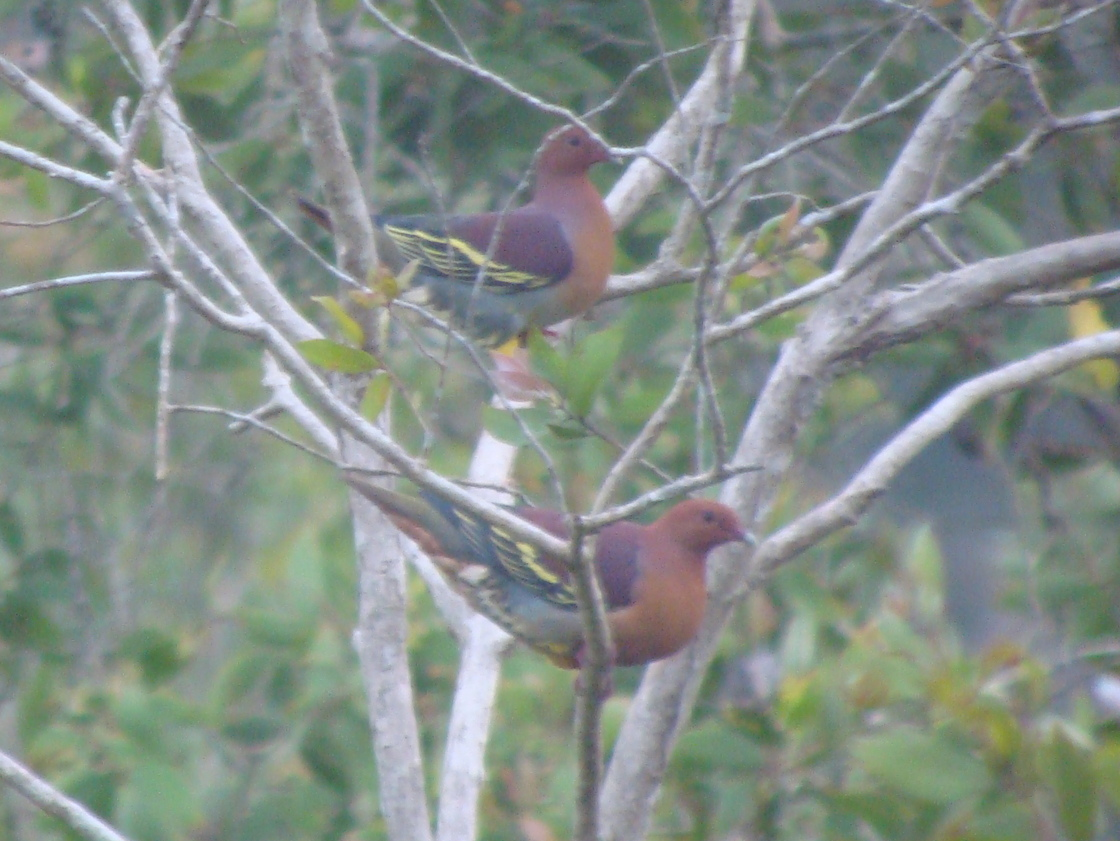
- males
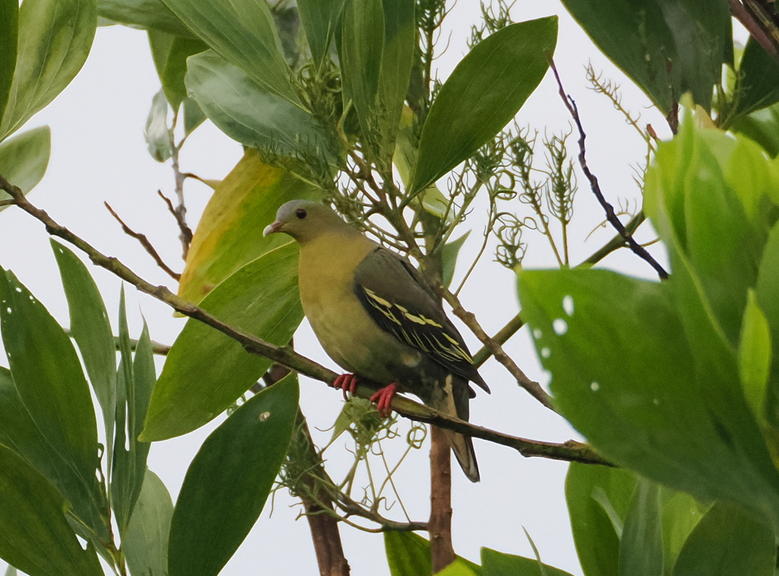
- female

Conservation status
- Vulnerable (IUCN 3.1)

Scientific classification
- Kingdom: Animalia
- Phylum: Chordata
- Class: Aves
- Order: Columbiformes
- Family: Columbidae
- Genus: Treron
- Species: T. fulvicollis

Binomial name
- Treron fulvicollis (Wagler, 1827)

= Cinnamon-headed green pigeon =

Species of bird

The cinnamon-headed green pigeon (Treron fulvicollis) is a species of bird in the family Columbidae. It is found in Brunei, Indonesia, Malaysia, Myanmar, Singapore, and Thailand. Its natural habitats are subtropical or tropical mangrove forests, subtropical or tropical swamps, subtropical or tropical moist shrubland, and rural gardens. It is threatened by habitat loss.
