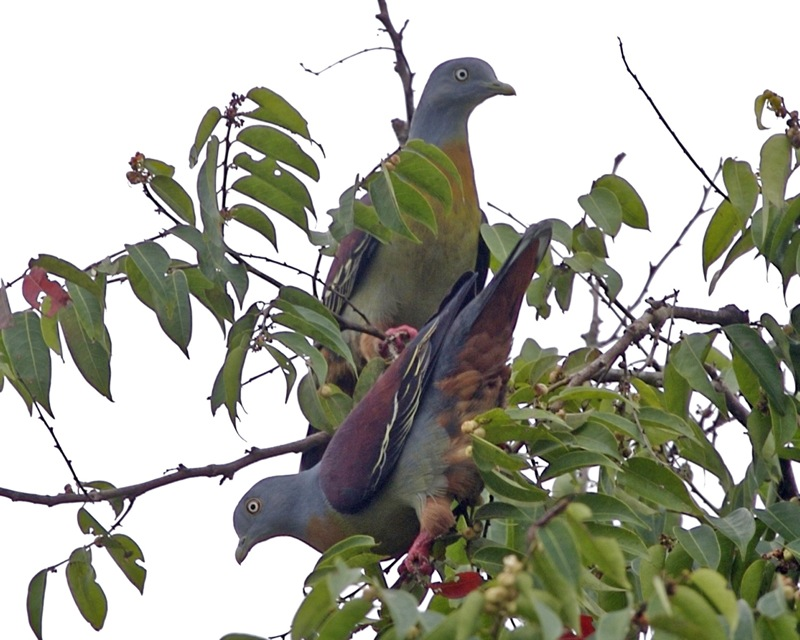
- Panti Forest, Johor, Malaysia

Conservation status
- Least Concern (IUCN 3.1)

Scientific classification
- Kingdom: Animalia
- Phylum: Chordata
- Class: Aves
- Order: Columbiformes
- Family: Columbidae
- Genus: Treron
- Species: T. olax

Binomial name
- Treron olax (Temminck, 1823)

Synonyms
- T. o. hageni T. o. arismicra

= Little green pigeon =

Species of bird

The little green pigeon (Treron olax) is a species of bird in the family Columbidae. It is found in Brunei, Indonesia, Malaysia, Singapore, and Thailand. Its natural habitat is subtropical or tropical moist lowland forests. It is smaller than other species in the genus Treron.

This pigeon is about 21–22 cm (8.3–8.7 in) long and they are sexually dimorphic with males having an orange neck patch shading into yellow on the underside and a maroon mantle which are absent on females which are largely olive green above and yellow on the underside. Like other green pigeons they are frugivorous and found in forested habitats.
