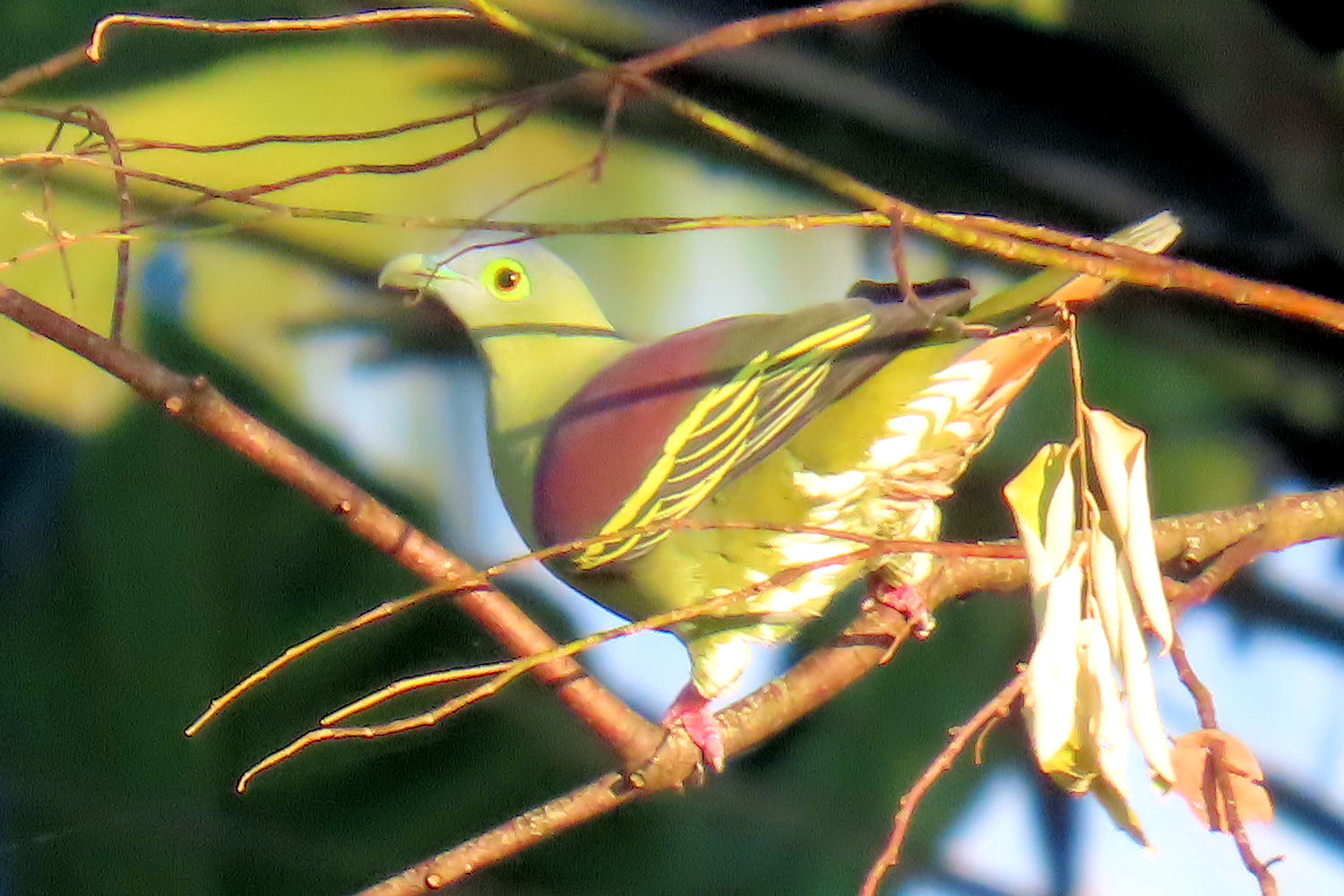
- Grey-cheeked Green Pigeon, Ubud, Bali, Indonesia

Conservation status
- Least Concern (IUCN 3.1)

Scientific classification
- Kingdom: Animalia
- Phylum: Chordata
- Class: Aves
- Order: Columbiformes
- Family: Columbidae
- Genus: Treron
- Species: T. griseicauda

Binomial name
- Treron griseicauda Bonaparte, 1855

Synonyms
- Osmotreron griseicauda

= Grey-cheeked green pigeon =

Species of bird

The grey-cheeked green pigeon (Treron griseicauda) is a species of bird in the family Columbidae. It is endemic to Indonesia. Its diet consists of fruit, primarily figs. People in Java, Indonesia commonly hunt it using nylon, in a practice known as racik.

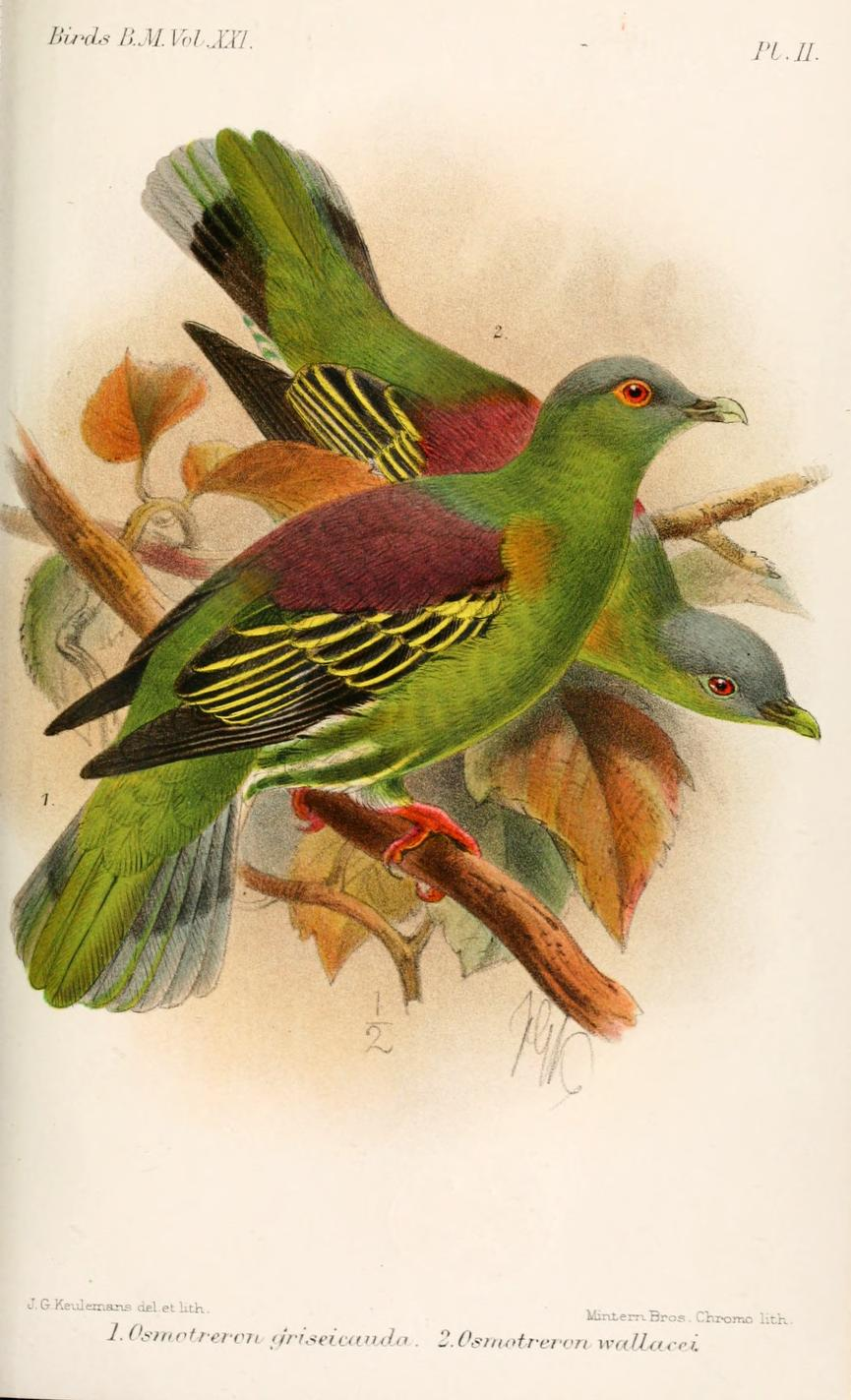
Illustration by Keulemans, 1893
