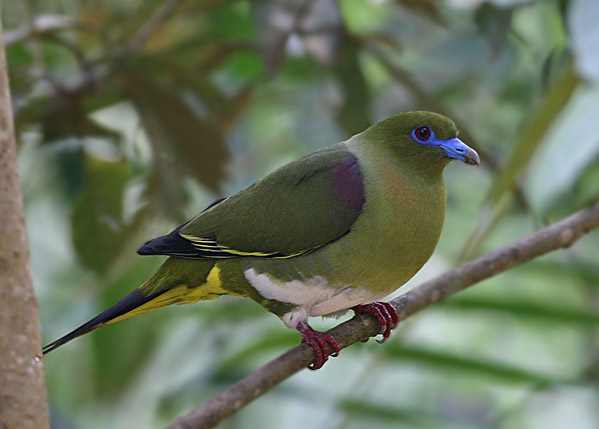

Conservation status
- Least Concern (IUCN 3.1)

Scientific classification
- Kingdom: Animalia
- Phylum: Chordata
- Class: Aves
- Order: Columbiformes
- Family: Columbidae
- Genus: Treron
- Species: T. seimundi

Binomial name
- Treron seimundi (Robinson, 1910)

= Yellow-vented green pigeon =

Species of bird

The yellow-vented green pigeon (Treron seimundi), also known as Seimunds's Pintail Pigeon, is a species of bird in the family Columbidae. It is found in Laos, Malaysia, Thailand, and Vietnam. Its natural habitats are subtropical or tropical moist lowland forest, subtropical or tropical mangrove forest, and subtropical or tropical moist montane forest.

== Description ==
The Yellow-vented green pigeon has a yellow vent, like the name suggests. Its body is mostly a dull green, but the neck, throat, chest and belly have a lighter green pigment. The eye rings and beak are both blue, the tip of the beak is grey. The pigeon's iris and feet are red. It has white legs and brown-violet patches on the shoulders.
