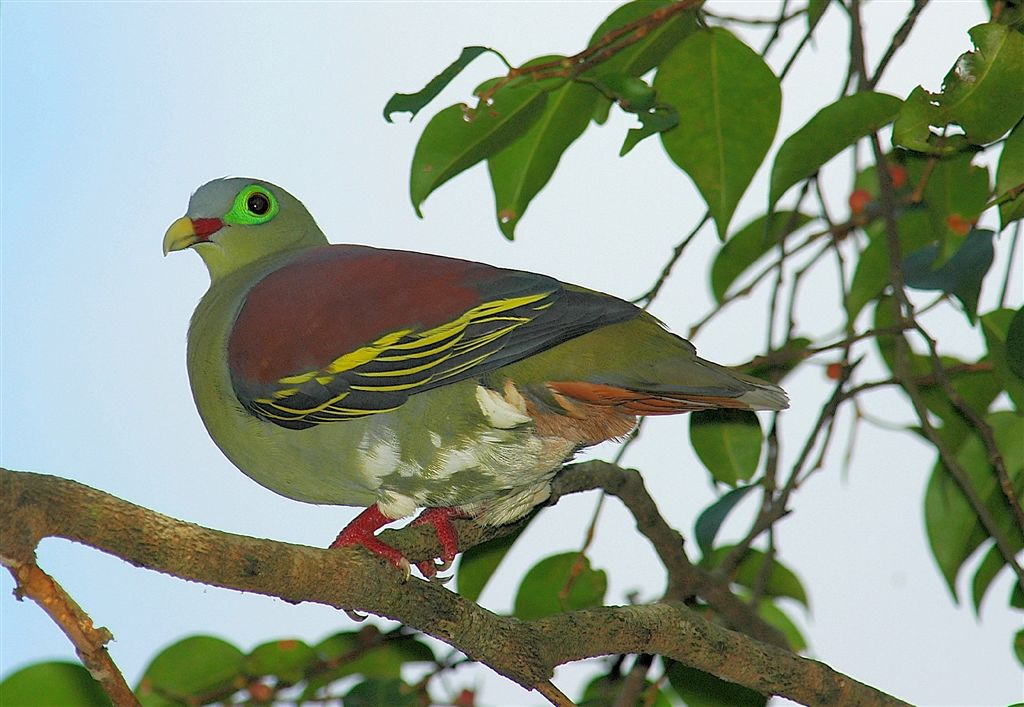
- At Upper Seletar Reservoir, Singapore

Conservation status
- Least Concern (IUCN 3.1)

Scientific classification
- Kingdom: Animalia
- Phylum: Chordata
- Class: Aves
- Order: Columbiformes
- Family: Columbidae
- Genus: Treron
- Species: T. curvirostra

Binomial name
- Treron curvirostra (Gmelin, JF, 1789)

= Thick-billed green pigeon =

Species of bird

The thick-billed green pigeon (Treron curvirostra) is a species of bird in the family Columbidae.

== Taxonomy ==
The thick-billed green pigeon was formally described in 1789 by the German naturalist Johann Friedrich Gmelin in his revised and expanded edition of Carl Linnaeus's Systema Naturae. He placed it with all the other doves and pigeons in the genus Columba and coined the binomial name Columba curvirostra. Gmelin based his description on the "Hook-billed Pigeon" from the "island of Tanna in the South Seas" that had been described and illustrated in 1783 by the English ornithologist John Latham. Latham was mistaken in believing that his specimen had come from the island of Tanna in the New Hebrides. The type locality was designated as the Malay Peninsula by Harry C. Oberholser in 1912. The thick-billed green pigeon is now placed with around 30 other green pigeons in the genus Treron that was introduced in 1816 by the French ornithologist Louis Pierre Vieillot. The genus name is from the Ancient Greek trērōn meaning "pigeon" or "dove". The specific epithet curvirostra combines the Latin curvus meaning "curved" with -rostris meaning "billed".

Seven subspecies are recognized:

- T. c. nipalensis (Hodgson, 1836) – central Nepal and northeast India through Myanmar to south Indochina
- T. c. hainanus Hartert, EJO & Goodson, 1918 – Hainan Island (off southeast China)
- T. c. curvirostra (Gmelin, JF, 1789) – Malay Peninsula, Sumatra, Borneo, Mindoro and Palawan group (northwest, southwest Philippines)
- T. c. haliplous Oberholser, 1912 – Simeulue (west of north Sumatra)
- T. c. pegus Oberholser, 1912 – Nias (west of north Sumatra)
- T. c. smicrus Oberholser, 1912 – Sipura, Siberut and Batu Islands (west of central Sumatra)
- T. c. hypothapsinus Oberholser, 1912 – Enggano Island (west of south Sumatra)

== Description ==
Female bird

Rather small-sized pigeon being under 26 cm (10 in) as compared to other green pigeons. A thick pale greenish bill with red base, broad bluish-Green eye ring, grey crown and maroon mantle diagnostic. Wings have black primary and secondaries with yellow outer edge. Underside green in both sexes. Thighs dark green with whitish scales. Female has greenish undertail coverts with whitish scales. Males have maroon dorsum and dull chestnut undertail coverts.

== Distribution and habitat ==
It ranges across the eastern regions of the Indian subcontinent and Southeast Asia, stretching from the Eastern Himalayas to Borneo and Sumatra.

Found across Bangladesh, Bhutan, Brunei, Cambodia, Hong Kong, India, Indonesia, Laos, Malaysia, Myanmar, Nepal, the Philippines, Singapore, Thailand, Tibet and Vietnam.

Its natural habitats are subtropical or tropical moist lowland forests and subtropical or tropical mangrove forests.

== Behaviour and ecology ==
Known to feed on syconia of Figs walking slowly along the branches.

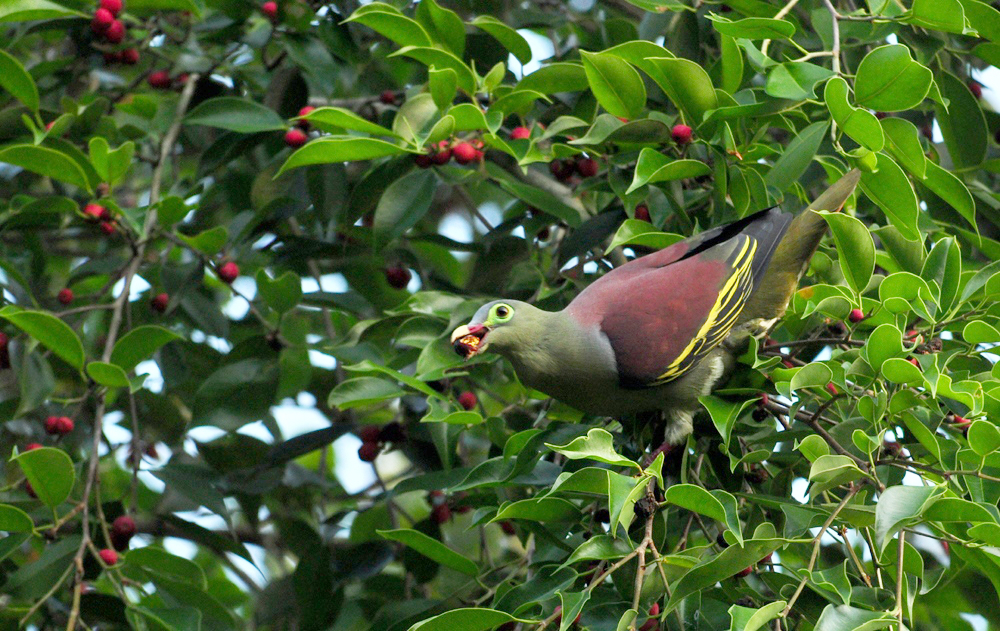
Thick-billed green pigeon male

== Various views and plumages ==
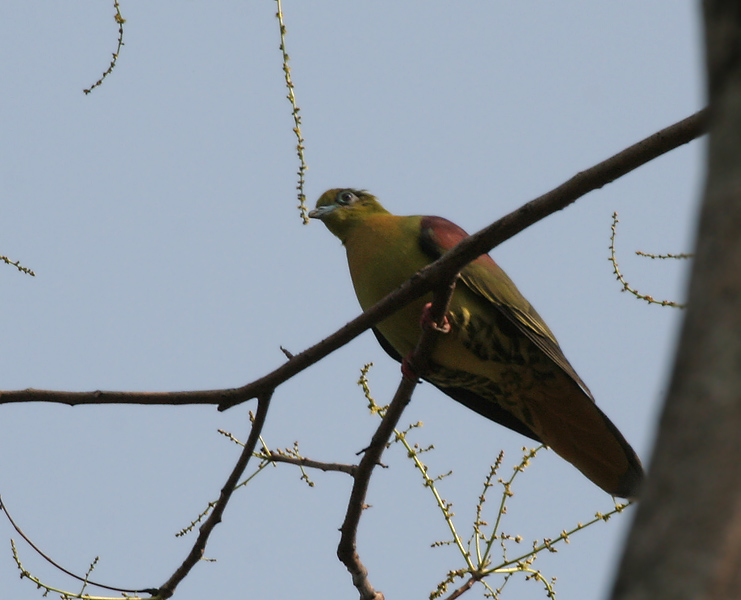
at Jayanti in Buxa Tiger Reserve in Jalpaiguri district of West Bengal, India.

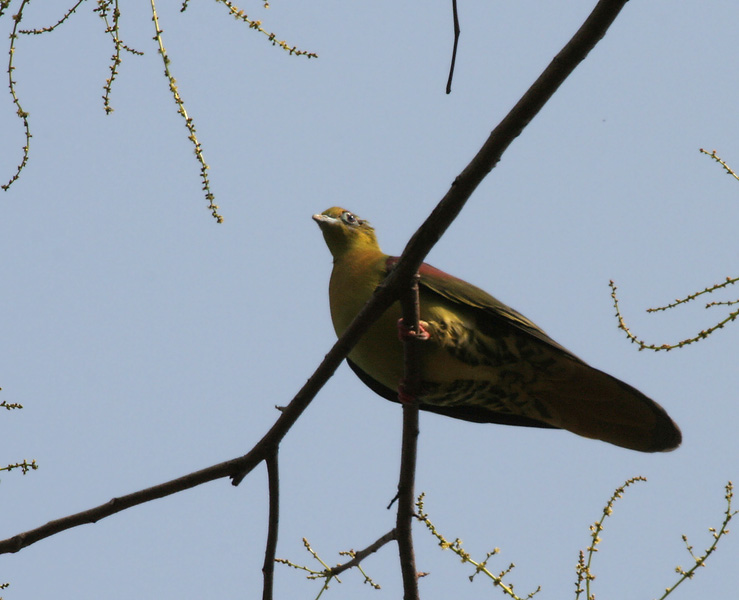
at Jayanti in Buxa Tiger Reserve in Jalpaiguri district of West Bengal, India.

Khao Yai NP, July 1994
