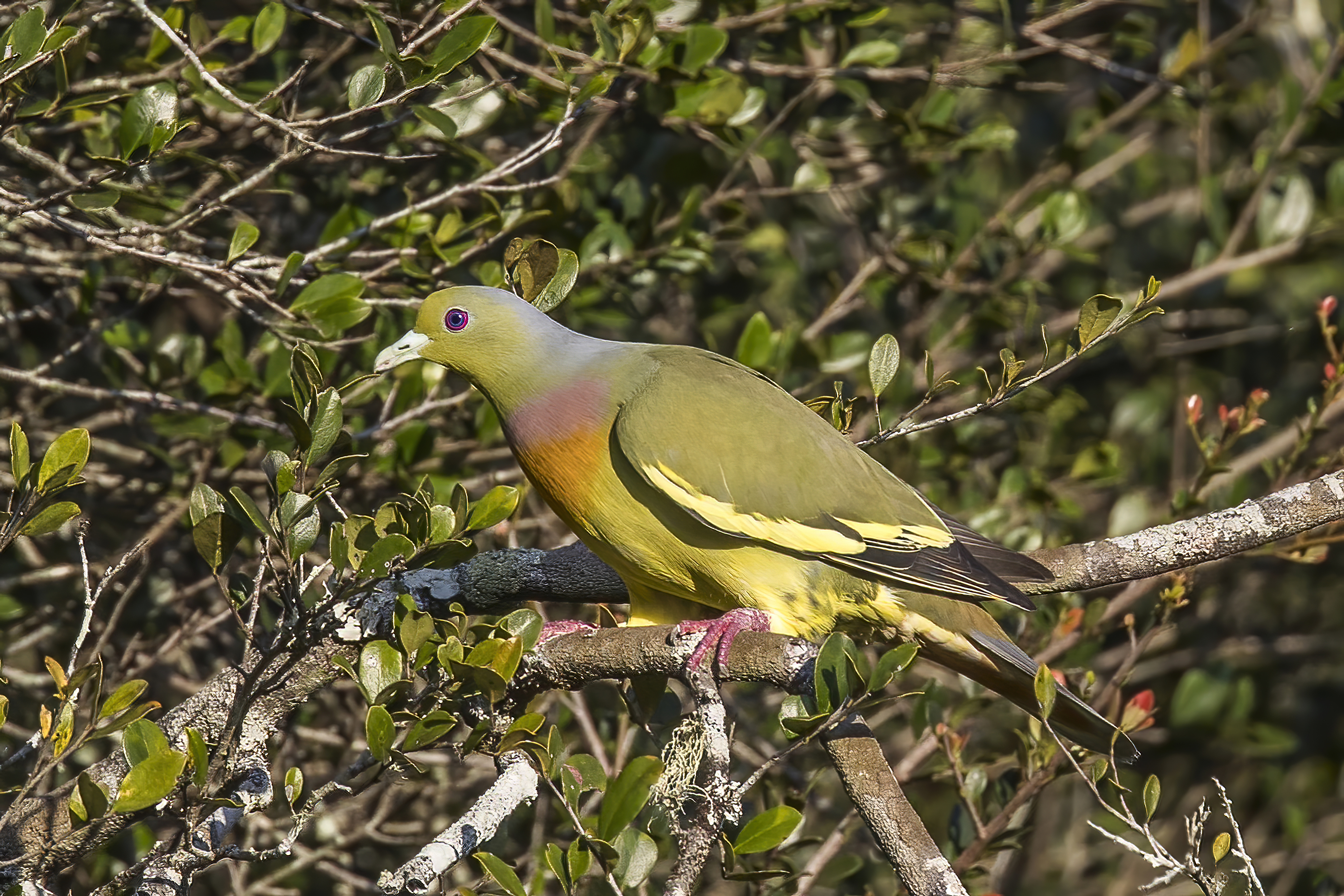
- male T. b. leggei Yala National Park, Sri Lanka

Conservation status
- Least Concern (IUCN 3.1)

Scientific classification
- Kingdom: Animalia
- Phylum: Chordata
- Class: Aves
- Order: Columbiformes
- Family: Columbidae
- Genus: Treron
- Species: T. bicinctus

Binomial name
- Treron bicinctus (Jerdon, 1840)

Synonyms
- Treron bicincta Osmotreron bicincta Vinago bicincta Dendrophasa bicincta

= Orange-breasted green pigeon =

Species of bird

Orange-breasted Green Pigeon (Treron bicinctus) from Ezhimala

The orange-breasted green pigeon (Treron bicinctus) is a pigeon found across tropical Asia south of the Himalaya across parts of the Indian subcontinent and Southeast Asia. Like other green pigeons, it feeds mainly on small fruit. They may be found in pairs or in small flocks, foraging quietly and moving slowly on trees. The nape is blue-grey and the crown is yellowish green. The uppertail coverts are bronzed and the undertail coverts are unmarked rufous. The male has a pinkish band on the upper breast with a broader orange one below while the female has a bright yellow breast.

== Identification ==
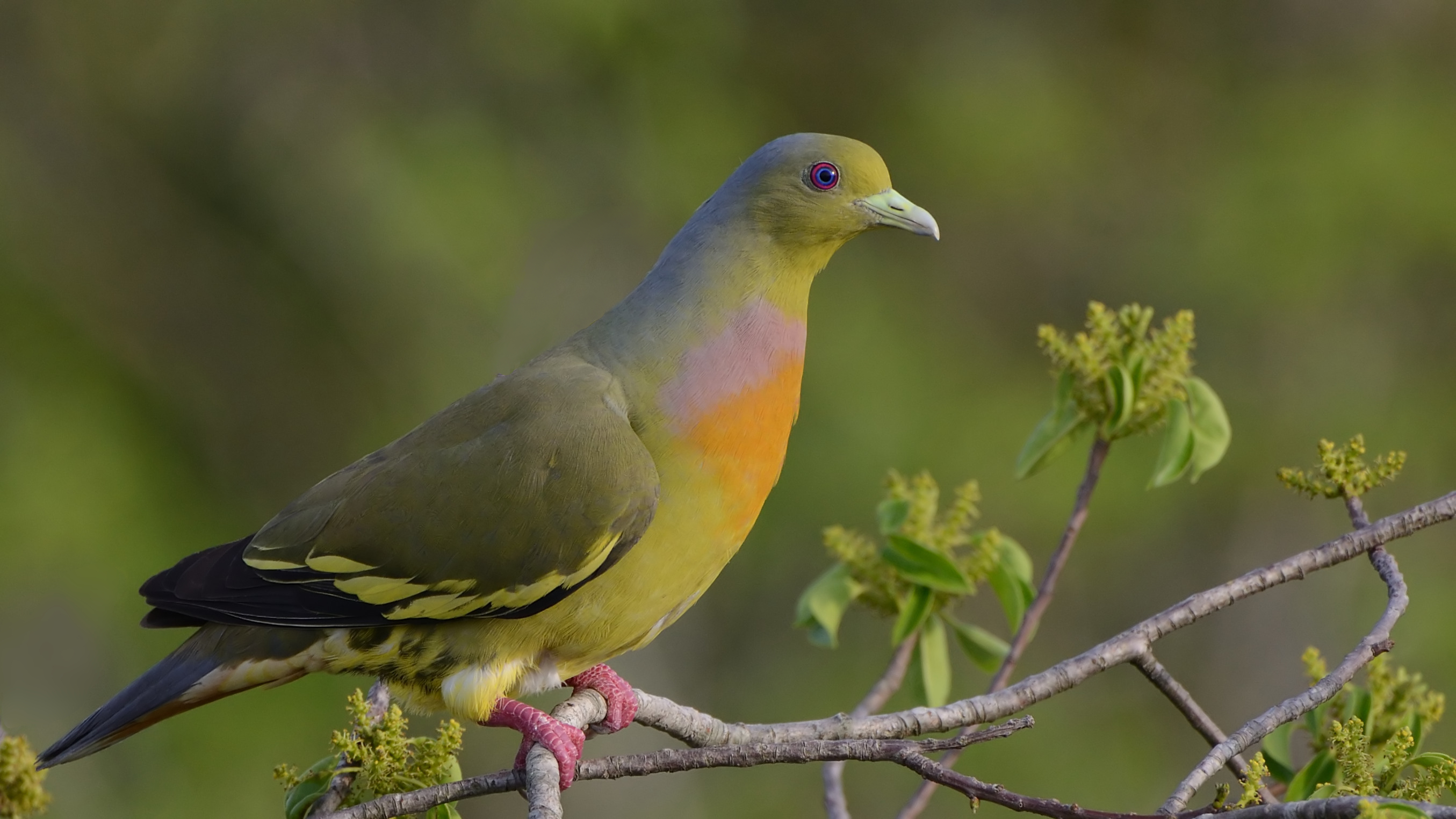
Adult male at Sunderbans, India

Similar in appearance to other green pigeons including the yellow-footed green pigeon and the grey-fronted green pigeon but has no maroon on the wing. The male does not have any grey on the head but has a narrow band of lilac on the upper breast with a broader orange band below. The undertail-coverts are cinnamon with the longer feathers edged yellow. The tail is grey above with a broad subterminal dark band. The females are yellow below and lack the orange or lilac bands. The undertail coverts are duller cinnamon with greenish spots. The upper tail however has the central feathers slaty grey rather than green as in females of T. affinis or T. pompadora. The Sri Lankan population (T. b. leggei) is slightly smaller in wing length but otherwise similar. Other populations that have been named as subspecies include domvilii (Swinhoe, 1870) of Hainan Island and javanus Robinson & Kloss, 1923 from Java and Bali. Population praetermissa from Thailand is often included in the nominate form.

== Habitat and distribution ==
This is a species of forest and is widely distributed from the Terai and lower Himalayas (below 1,500 m (4,900 ft)) south mainly in the Western and Eastern Ghats and in Sri Lankan forests not far from the coast. They are found in Burma, Thailand the Malay Peninsula, Vietnam, Java and Hainan. Some seasonal movements are suspected as vagrants have been recorded from locations like Sindh.

== Behaviour and ecology ==
Orange-breasted green pigeons usually occur singly or in small groups. Its flight is fast and direct, with the regular beats and an occasional sharp flick of the wings which are characteristic of pigeons in general. They eat seeds and fruits of a wide variety of plants often joining other frugivores at fruiting figs, foraging by slowly walking along branches. They are known to feed on Strychnos nux-vomica, the fruits of which are toxic to mammals. They are sometimes seen on the ground. Their call is a low subdued series of modulated wandering whistles. Males fight with each other during the breeding season, slapping each other with their wing and pecking each other. The breeding season in India is March to September but mainly before June. In Sri Lanka, they breed mainly from December to May. The nest is the typical flimsy platform of a few twigs in which two white eggs are laid. Both sexes incubate and eggs hatch in about 12 to 14 days.
