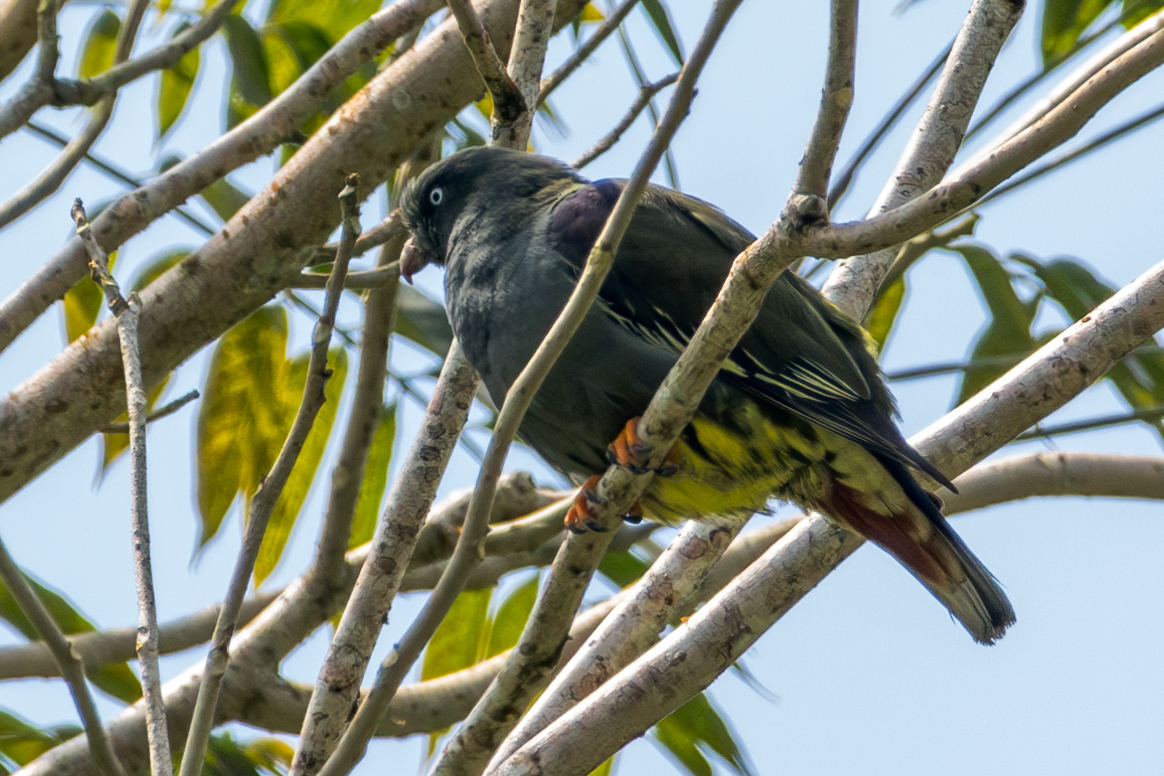

Conservation status
- Endangered (IUCN 3.1)

Scientific classification
- Kingdom: Animalia
- Phylum: Chordata
- Class: Aves
- Order: Columbiformes
- Family: Columbidae
- Genus: Treron
- Species: T. sanctithomae

Binomial name
- Treron sanctithomae (Gmelin, JF, 1789)

= São Tomé green pigeon =

Species of bird

The São Tomé green pigeon (Treron sanctithomae) is a species of bird in the family Columbidae. It is endemic to the island of São Tomé in São Tomé and Príncipe. Its natural habitat is subtropical or tropical moist lowland forests. The species was described by Johann Friedrich Gmelin in 1789. They have disappeared from Ilhéu das Rolas due to habitat loss. There are between 37,007 and 109,255 pigeons of this species today, but this is decreasing due to unsustainable levels of hunting.

== Taxonomy ==
The São Tomé green pigeon was described by German naturalist Georg Marcgrave in 1648 and the English ornithologist Francis Willughby in 1678. When the German naturalist Johann Friedrich Gmelin revised and expanded Carl Linnaeus's Systema Naturae in 1789 he chose to include the São Tomé green pigeon. He placed it with all the other doves and pigeons in the genus Columba and coined the binomial name Columba sanctithomae. The São Tomé green pigeon is now placed with around 30 other green pigeons in the genus Treron that was introduced in 1816 by the French ornithologist Louis Pierre Vieillot. The genus name is from the Ancient Greek trērōn meaning "pigeon" or "dove". The specific epithet sanctithomae is from Late Latin sanctus meaning "saint" and Thomae for "Thomas". The species is monotypic as no subspecies are recognised.
