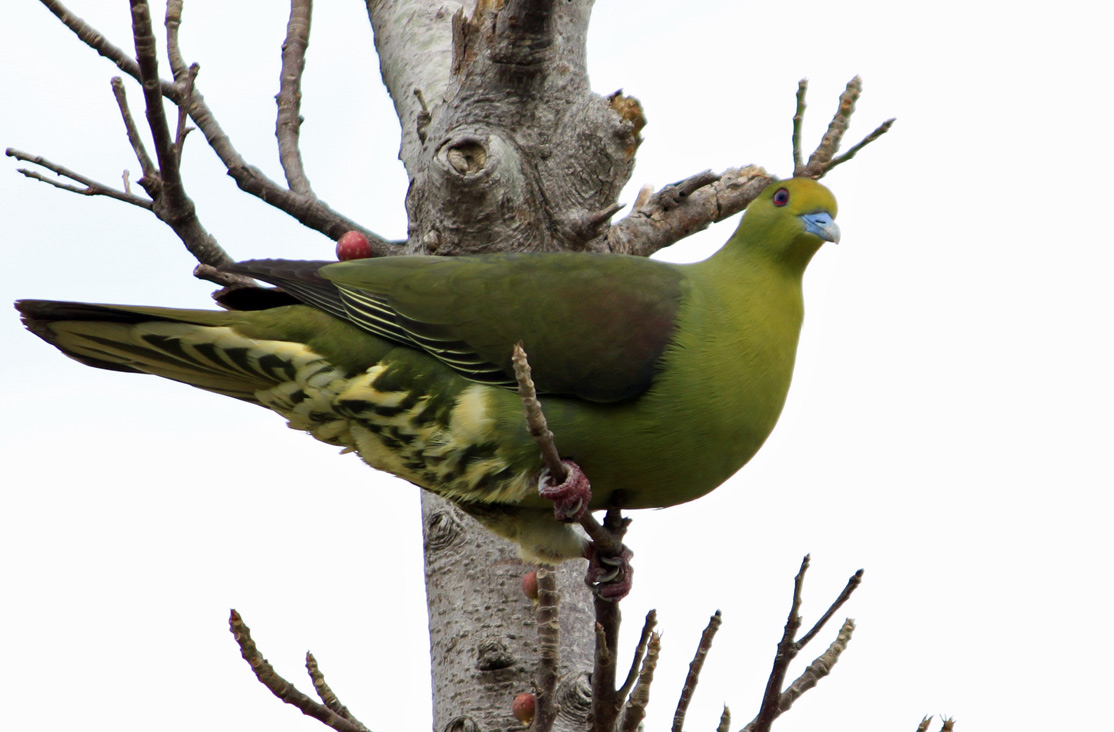
- On Kohama Island

Conservation status
- Least Concern (IUCN 3.1)

Scientific classification
- Domain: Eukaryota
- Kingdom: Animalia
- Phylum: Chordata
- Class: Aves
- Order: Columbiformes
- Family: Columbidae
- Genus: Treron
- Species: T. permagnus

Binomial name
- Treron permagnus Stejneger, 1887

= Ryukyu green pigeon =

Species of bird

The Ryukyu green pigeon (Treron permagnus) is a species of bird in the family Columbidae. It is endemic to the Ryukyu Islands in Japan. It was formerly considered a subspecies of the Taiwan green pigeon (T. formosae), but phylogenetic evidence indicates that both are distinct species, and it has thus been split by the IUCN Red List, BirdLife International, and the International Ornithologists' Union.

There are thought to be two subspecies:

- T. p. permagnus - northern Ryukyu Islands
- T. p. medioximus - southern Ryukyu Islands

Its natural habitats are subtropical or tropical moist lowland forests, plantations, and rural gardens. It is threatened by habitat loss. Following the extinctions of the Bonin and the Ryukyu wood pigeons, it is the only extant species of pigeon known to be endemic to Japan.
