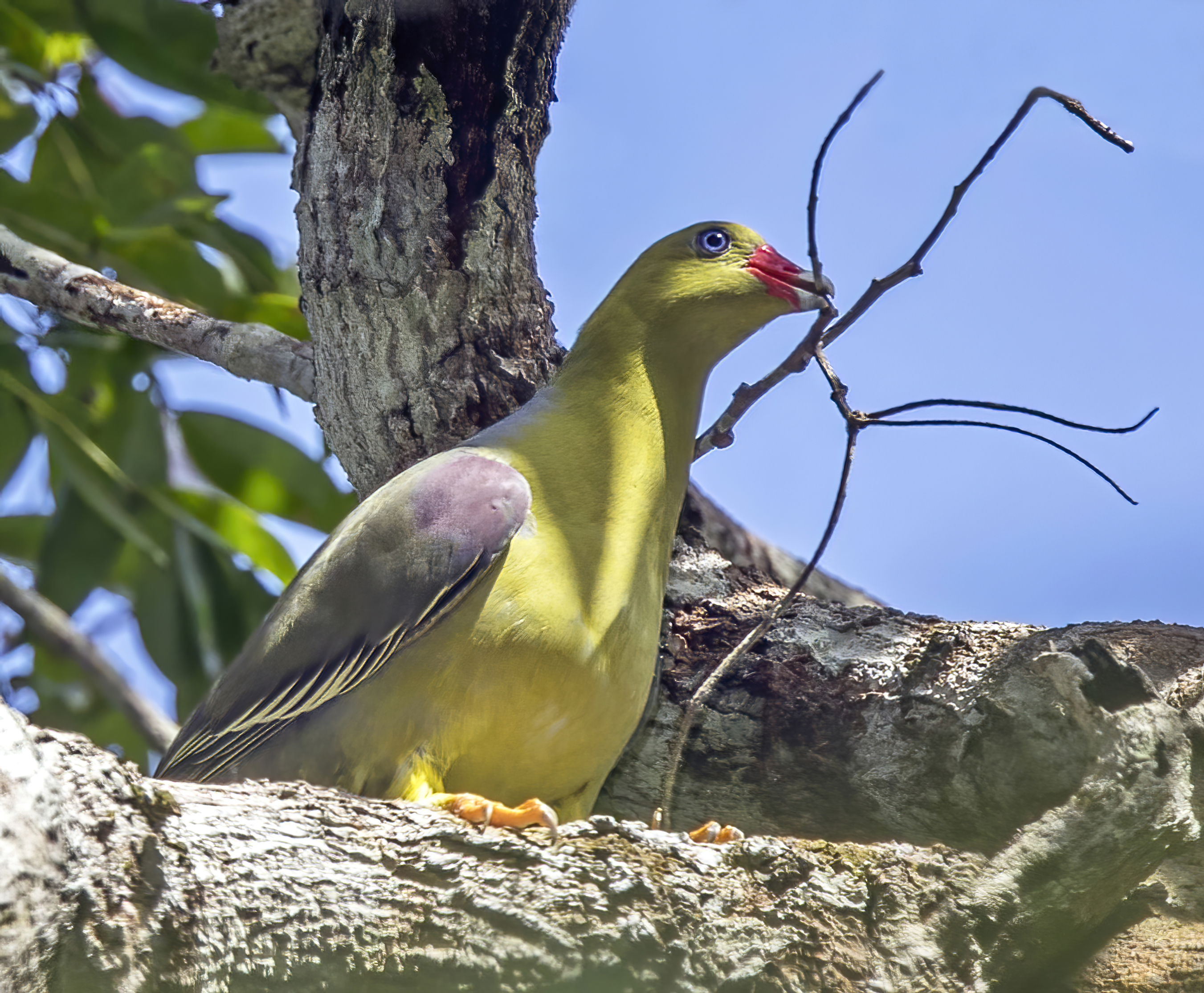
- T. c. sharpei, Ghana
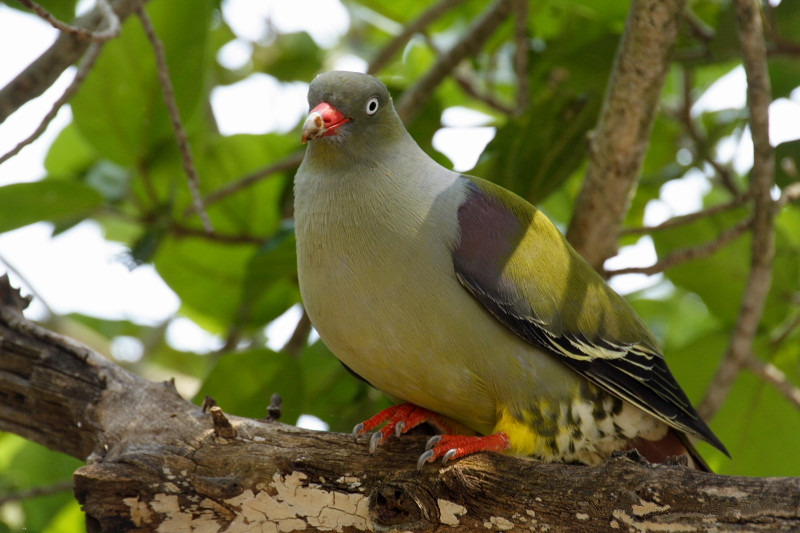
- T. c. delalandii, South Africa

Conservation status
- Least Concern (IUCN 3.1)

Scientific classification
- Kingdom: Animalia
- Phylum: Chordata
- Class: Aves
- Order: Columbiformes
- Family: Columbidae
- Genus: Treron
- Species: T. calvus

Binomial name
- Treron calvus (Temminck, 1811)

Synonyms
- Treron calva (Temminck, CJ 1811)

= African green pigeon =

Species of bird

The African green pigeon (Treron calvus) is a species of bird in the family Columbidae, and one of 5 green pigeon species in the Afrotropics. The species has a wide range in Sub-Saharan Africa with around 17 accepted races.

== Description and subspecies ==
Adult African green pigeons have maroon patches on the top of their wings and the juveniles have an olive color. The upperparts are grayish-green to yellowish-green; the thighs are yellow; and the feet and bill are red with the bill having a white tip.

- T. c. calvus: eastern Nigeria to northeastern Democratic Republic of the Congo and central Angola
- T. c. virescens: Principe Island (Gulf of Guinea)
- T. c. sharpei: Sierra Leone to south Nigeria and north Cameroon
- T. c. nudirostris: Senegal to Gambia and Guinea-Bissau
- T. c. poensis: Bioko Island (Gulf of Guinea)
- T. c. uellensis: South Sudan, northern Democratic Republic of the Congo, and Uganda
- T. c. brevicera: Southwest Ethiopia to north Tanzania east of Rift Valley (except for coast)
- T. c. salvadorii: eastern Democratic Republic of the Congo, southwestern Tanzania, Zambia, northern Malawi, and Mozambique
- T. c. wakefieldii: coastal Kenya and northeastern Tanzania
- T. c. schalowi: eastern Angola, northeastern Namibia, northern Botswana, and northwestern Zimbabwe
- T. c. ansorgei: West Angola (south of Cuanza River)
- T. c. vylderi: Northwest Namibia (east to Grootfontein)
- T. c. gibberifrons: southeastern South Sudan south to the Lake Victoria Basin in Uganda, Rwanda, Burundi, western Kenya, and northwestern Tanzania
- T. c. [delalandii, glaucus or orientalis]: coast from southeastern Tanzania south to South Africa (Eastern Cape Province)
- T. c. granti: Lowlands of east Tanzania and Zanzibar

== Range ==
They may occur and breed in high densities but are prone to regular local movements. Their range includes Angola, Benin, Botswana, Burkina Faso, Burundi, Cameroon, Central African Republic, Chad, Republic of the Congo, Democratic Republic of the Congo, Ivory Coast, Equatorial Guinea, Eswatini, Ethiopia, Gabon, Gambia, Ghana, Guinea, Guinea-Bissau, Kenya, Liberia, Malawi, Mali, Mauritania, Mozambique, Namibia, Niger, Nigeria, Rwanda, São Tomé and Príncipe, Senegal, Sierra Leone, Somalia, South Africa, South Sudan, Tanzania, Togo, Uganda, Zambia and Zimbabwe.

== Habits ==
As with others in their genus, they frequent tree canopies where their parrot-like climbing ability enable them to reach fruit, but rarely also forage on the ground. Their call is a series of flowing whistles, rendered as 'thweeeloo, thweeeoo'. They inhabit riparian forest, woodland and savanna, where they associate with fruiting trees, especially wild fig (Ficus) species, including Ficus sycomorus and Ficus sur, and in cities the ornamental Chinese banyan. They also take fruit of Saffrons (Cassine spp.), Jacket plum (Pappea capensis), Cordia africana , Buffalo thorn (Ziziphus mucronata), Water berry (Syzygium cordatum) and Jackalberry (Diospyros mespiliformis). They may also feed on exotic Loquats and Mulberries, or on carrion by occasion.

== Nesting ==
They nest in a tree fork that offers an adequate vantage point of their surrounds. The nest is a weak platform of sticks, collected by the male and arranged by the female.

== Pictures ==
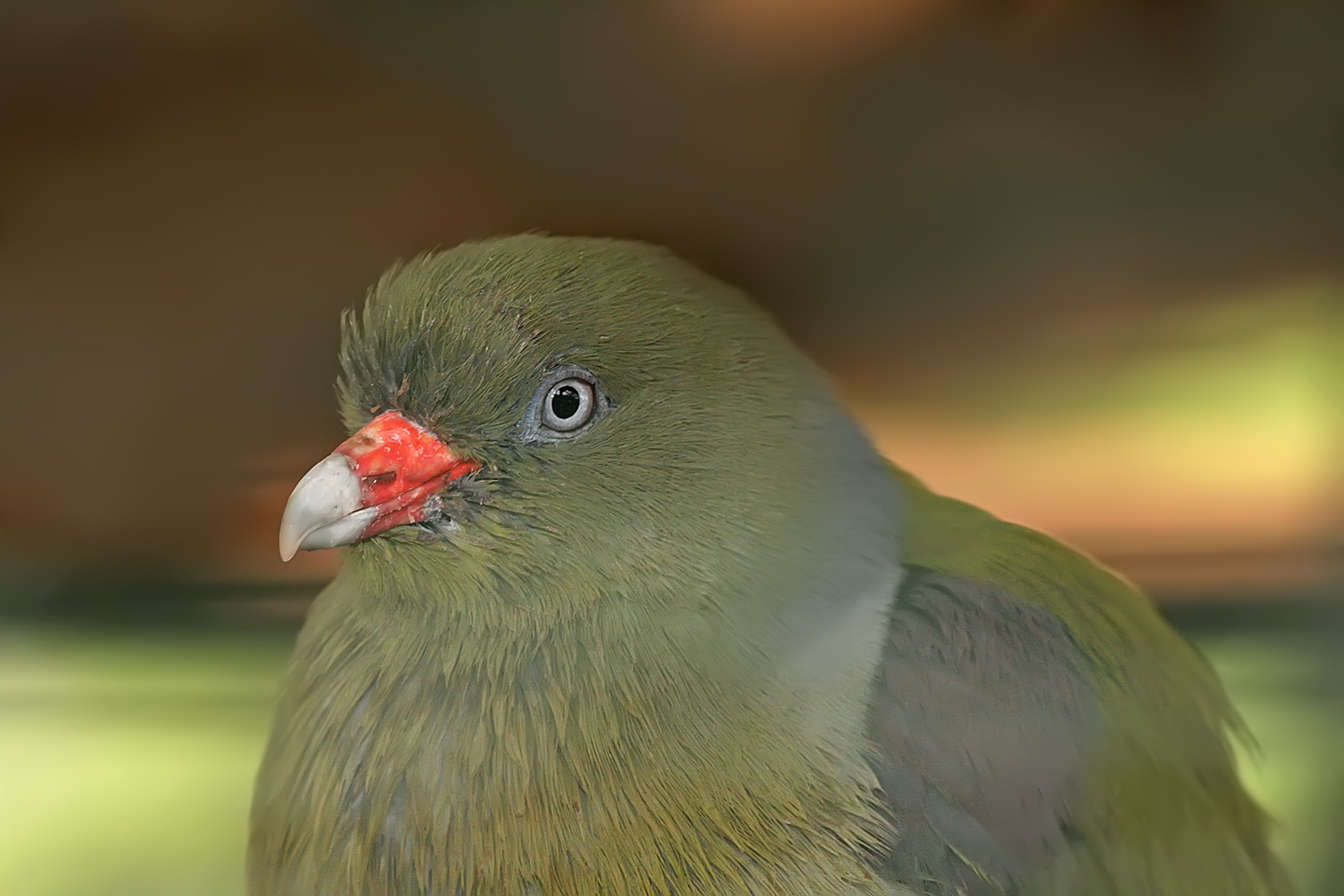
Close-up of the head

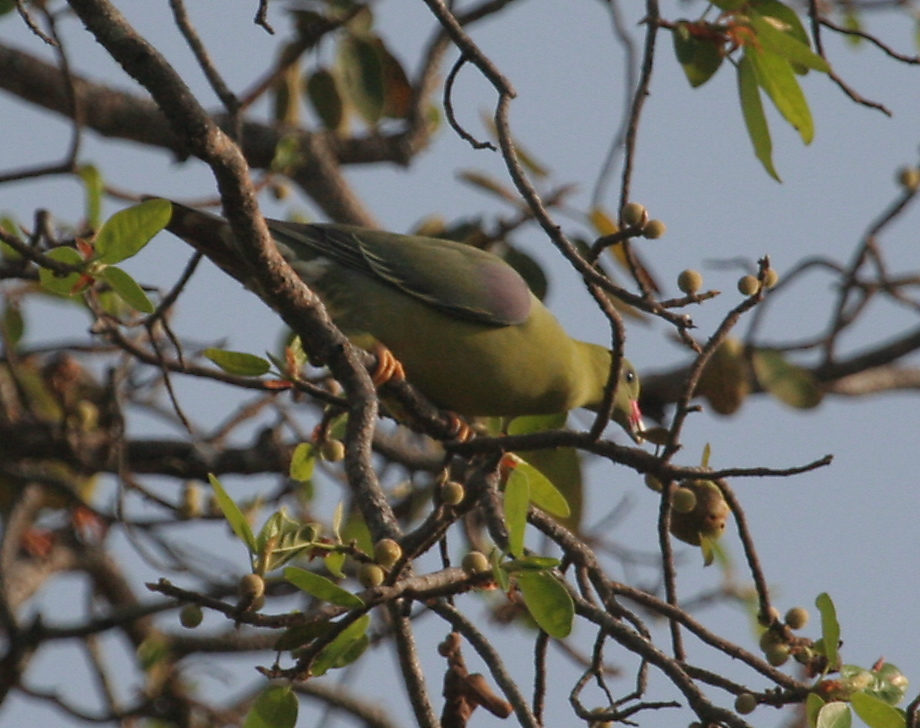
T. c. nudirostris feeding on wild figs, Gambia

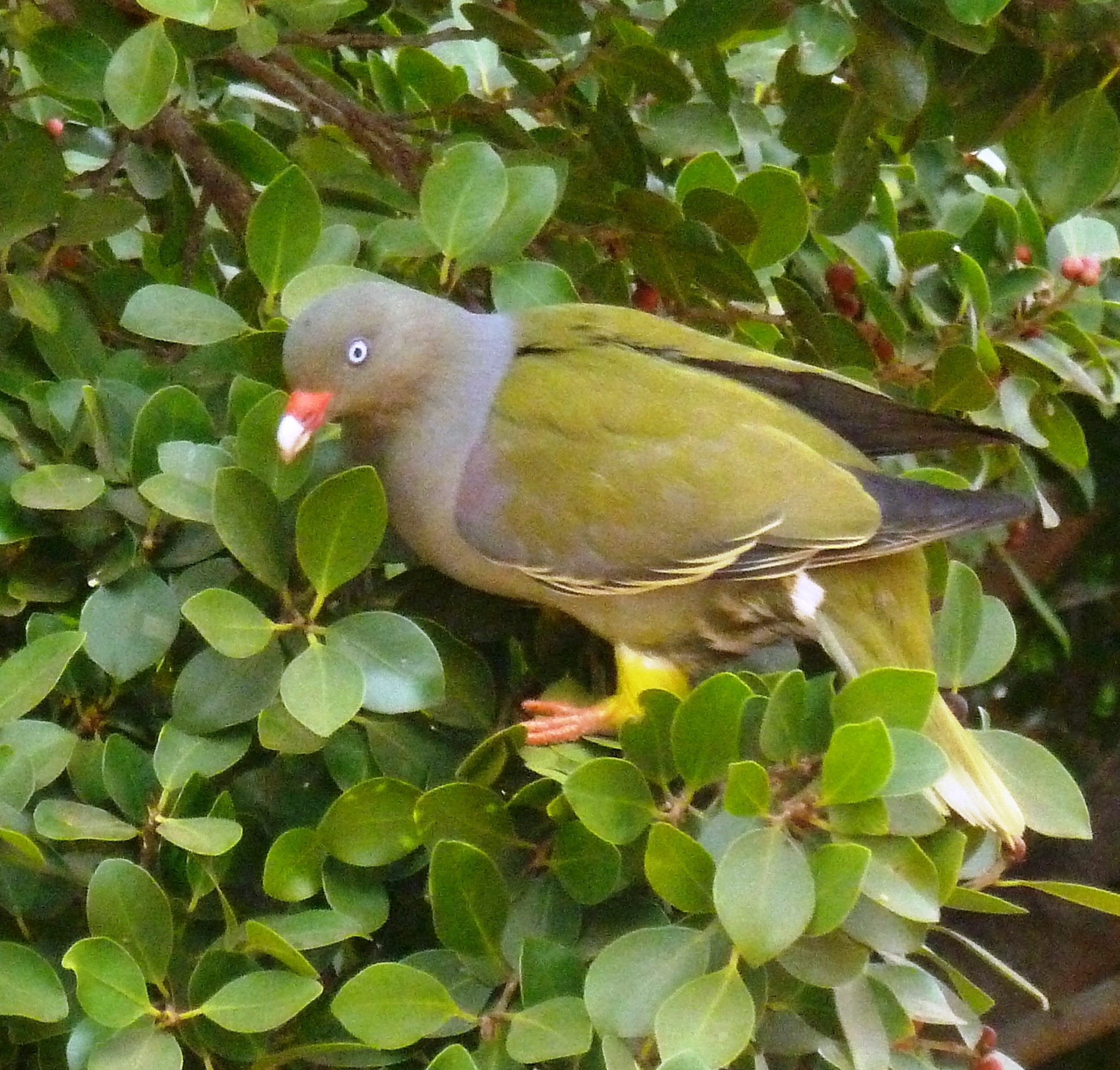
T. c. glaucus feeding in Ficus microcarpa, South Africa

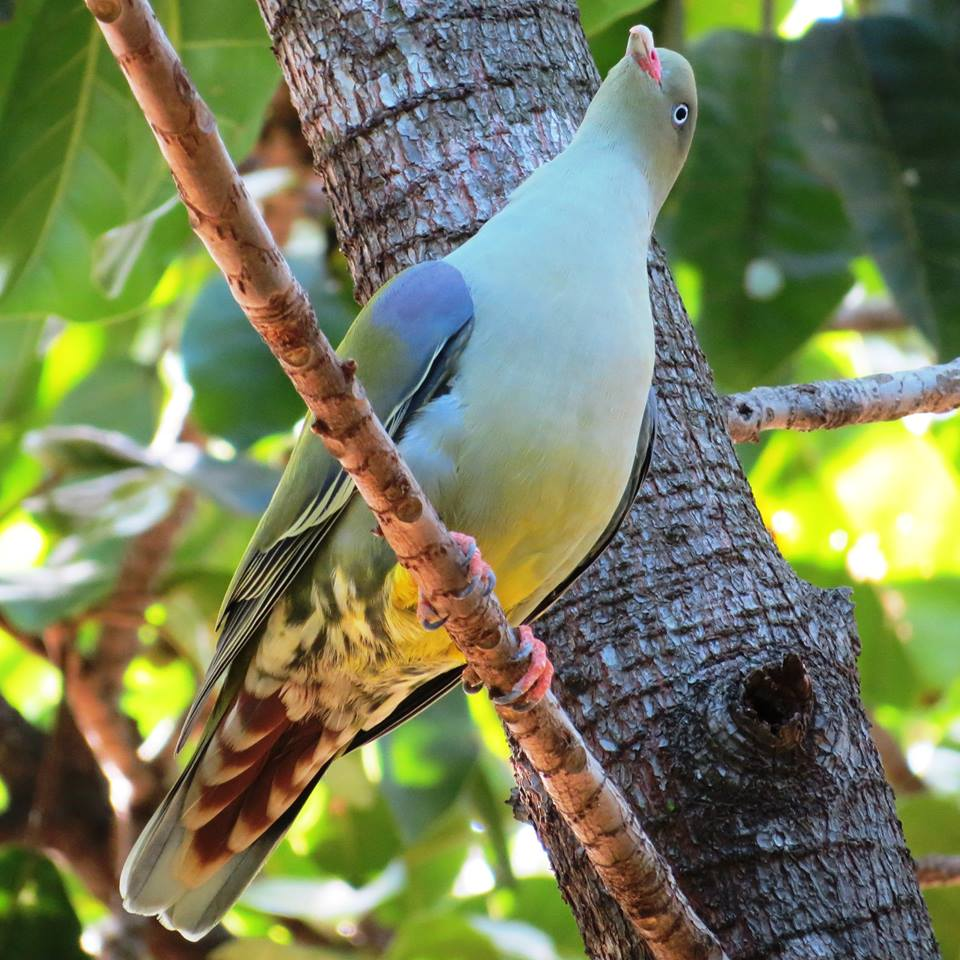
T. c. glaucus, showing chestnut undertail-coverts

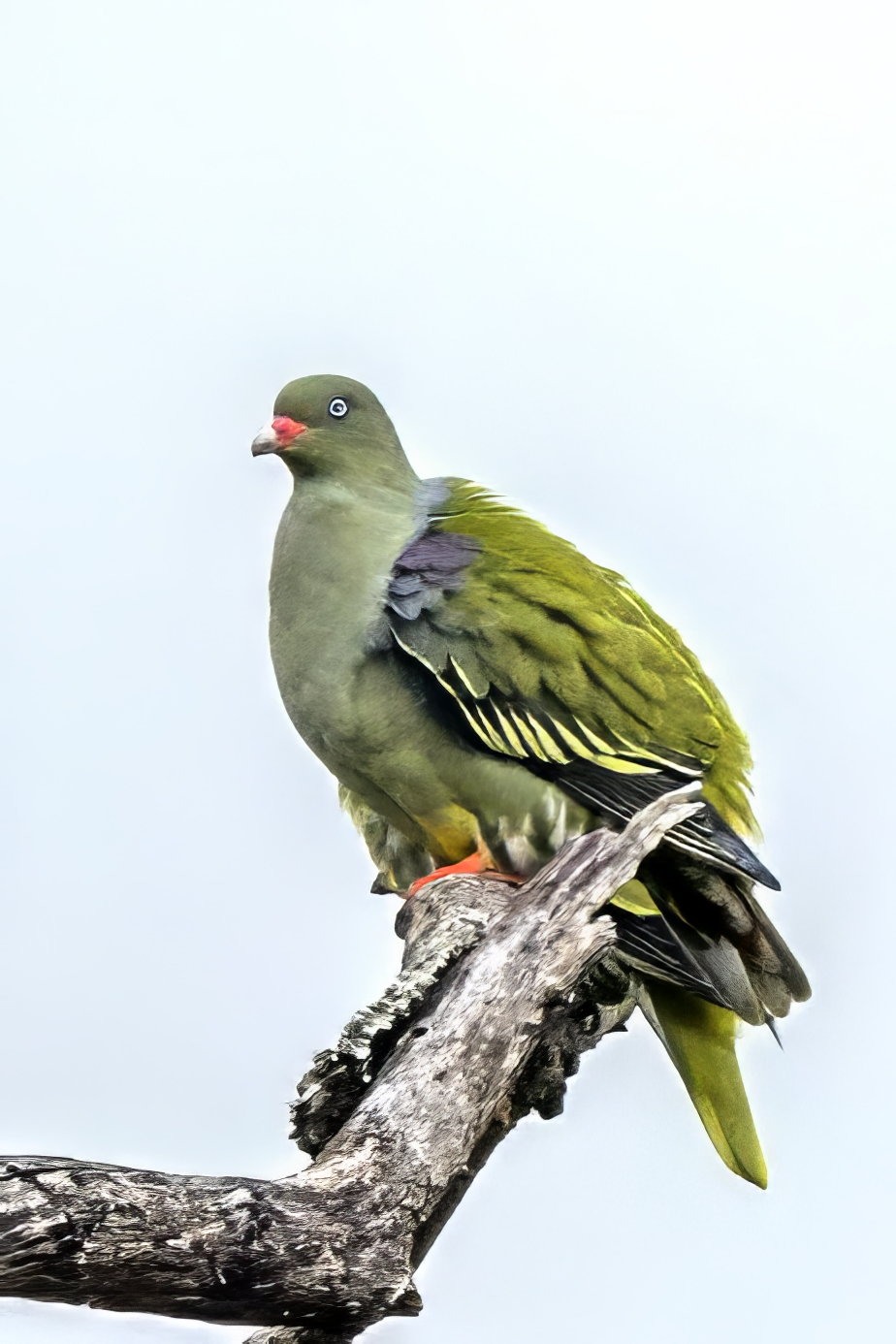
Kruger National Park, South Africa
