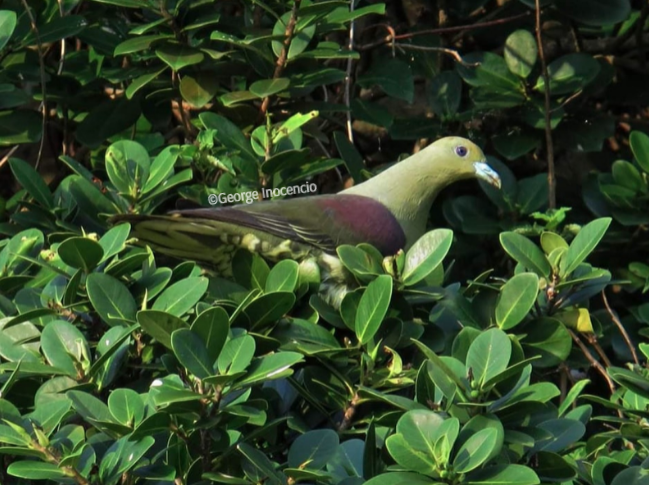
- Male
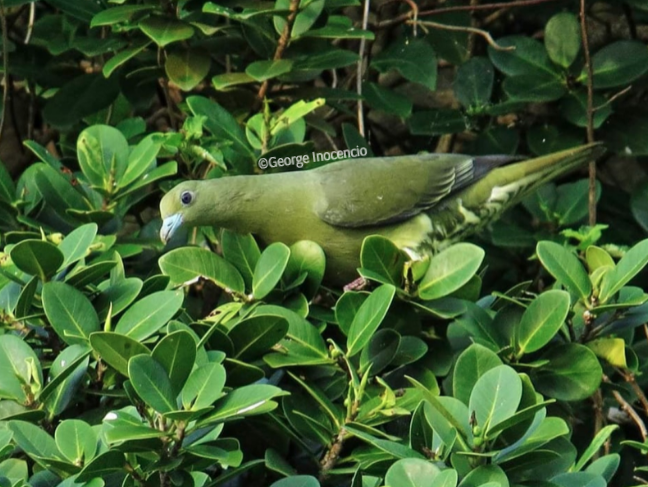
- Female

Conservation status
- Near Threatened (IUCN 3.1)

Scientific classification
- Kingdom: Animalia
- Phylum: Chordata
- Class: Aves
- Order: Columbiformes
- Family: Columbidae
- Genus: Treron
- Species: T. formosae

Binomial name
- Treron formosae R. Swinhoe, 1863

Synonyms
- Sphenocercus formosae

= Taiwan green pigeon =

Species of bird

The Taiwan green pigeon or whistling green pigeon (Treron formosae) is a bird in the family Columbidae. The species was first described by Robert Swinhoe in 1863. It is found in Taiwan and Batanes in the Philippines.

Its natural habitats are subtropical or tropical moist lowland forests and rural gardens. It is threatened by habitat loss.

== Taxonomy ==
The Ryukyu green pigeon (T. permagnus) of the Ryukyu Islands was formerly considered conspecific, with both species being united together as the whistling green pigeon, but was split as a distinct species by the IOC in 2021.

There are thought to be two subspecies:

- T. f. formosae - endemic to Taiwan
- T. f. filipinus - endemic to the Philippines, found on Batanes and the Babuyan Islands

== Description ==
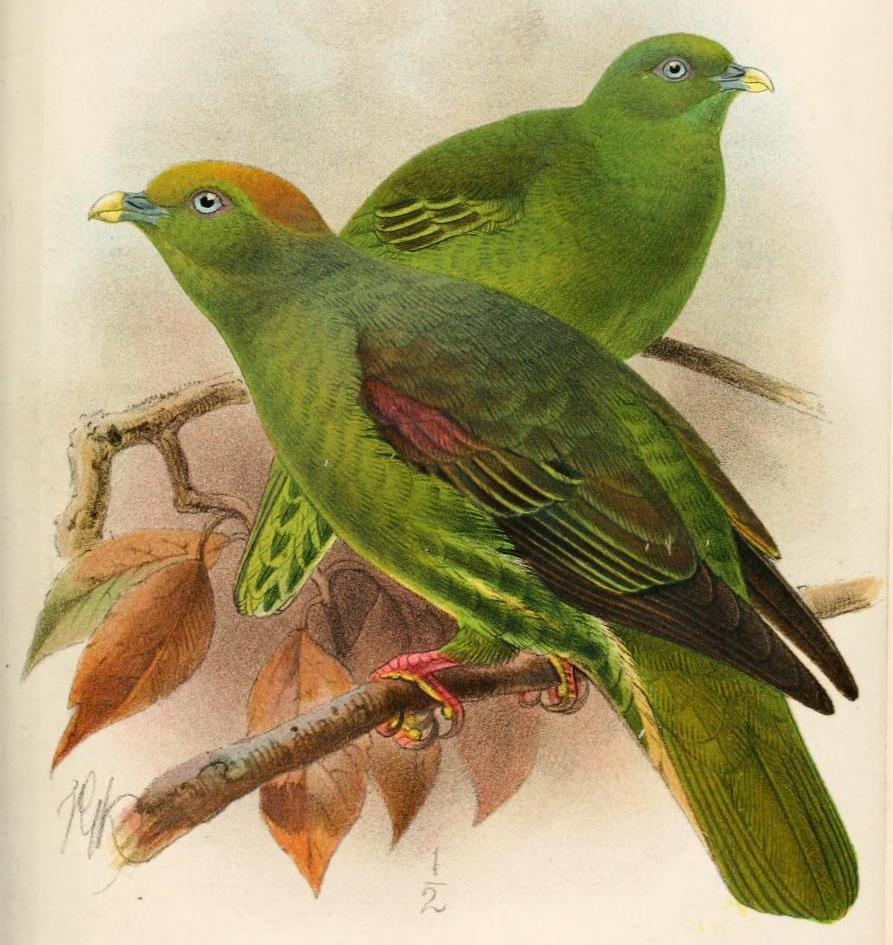
An illustration of a pair

The Taiwan green pigeon is visually similar to the Wedge-tailed green pigeon, but with usually darker plumage. Females are of various green shades throughout, and males have a distinctive purple-grey patch over the wings.

== Habitat and conservation status ==
It inhabits subtropical broadleaved evergreen forest, cultivated fields where there are trees nearby, mainly lowlands and hills on small islands but is mainly a montane species on Taiwan, where it occurs up to 2,000 metres (6,600 ft).

IUCN has assessed this bird as near threatened. This species' main threat is habitat loss and hunting.
