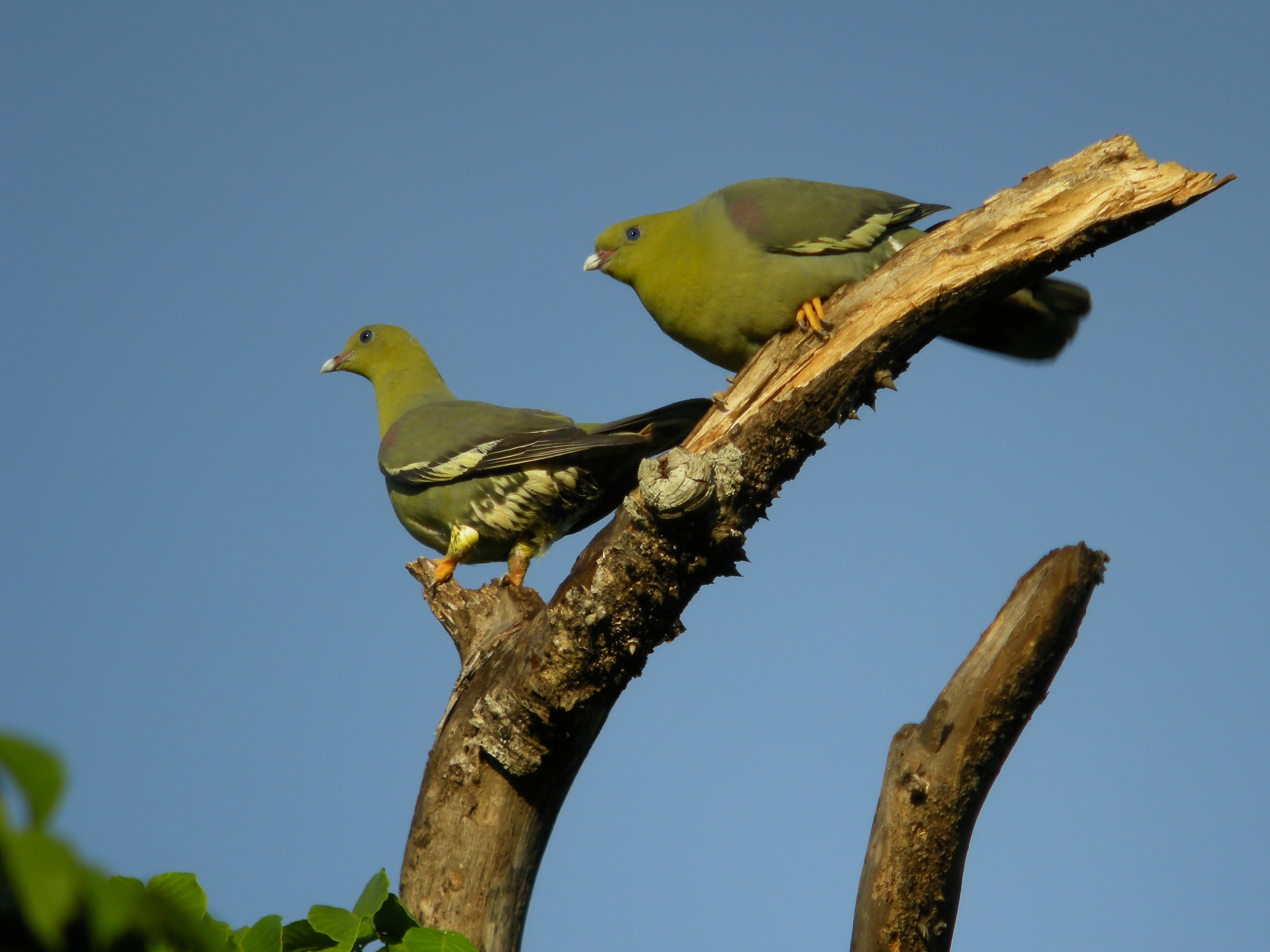
- At Ankarafantsika National Park, Mahajanga Province, Madagascar

Conservation status
- Least Concern (IUCN 3.1)

Scientific classification
- Kingdom: Animalia
- Phylum: Chordata
- Class: Aves
- Order: Columbiformes
- Family: Columbidae
- Genus: Treron
- Species: T. australis

Binomial name
- Treron australis (Linnaeus, 1771)

= Madagascar green pigeon =

Species of bird

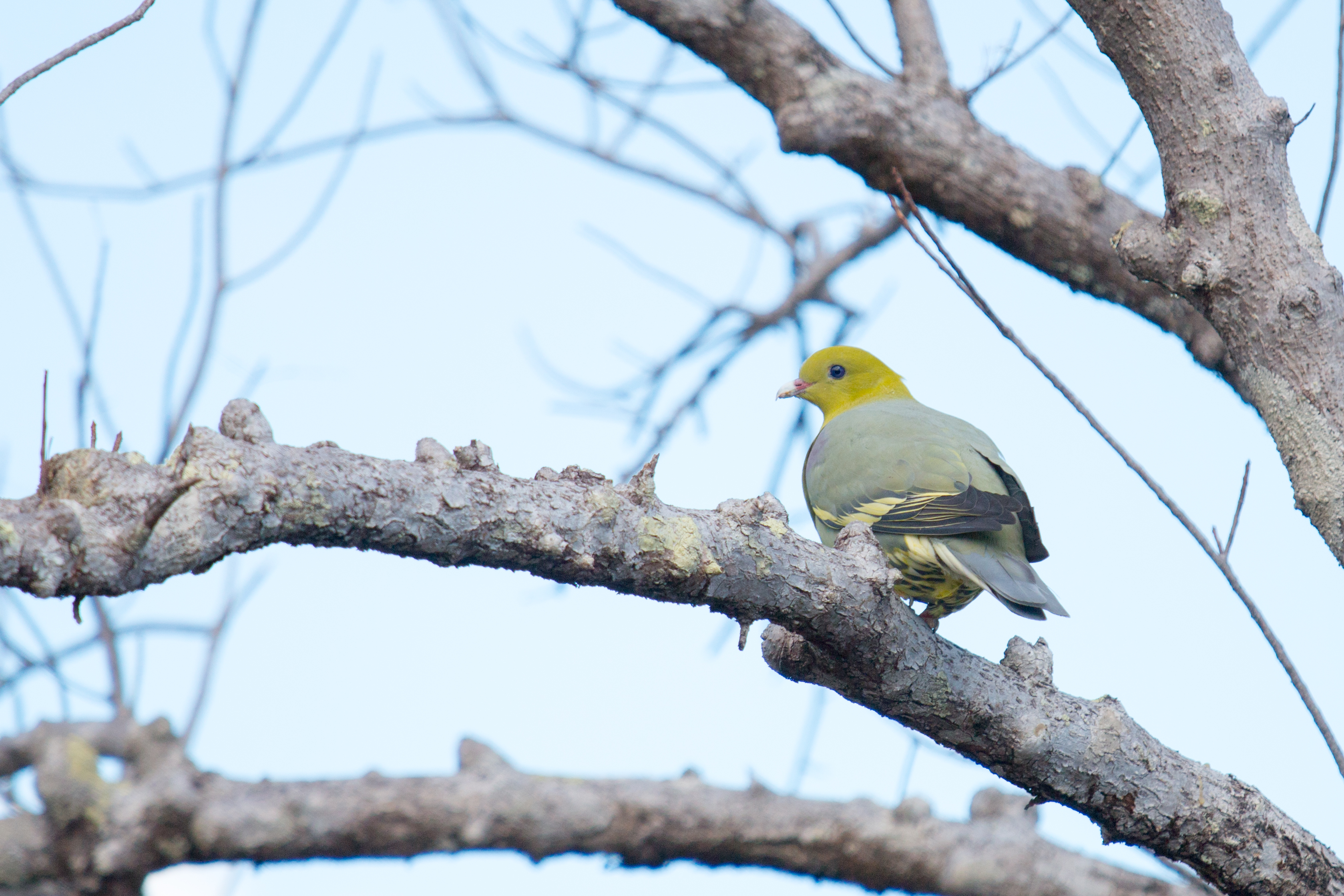
Treron australis in Madagascar

The Madagascar green pigeon or Madagascan green pigeon (Treron australis) is a species of bird in the family Columbidae. It is endemic to Madagascar. The taxon griveaudi, by most authorities considered a subspecies of the Madagascan green pigeon, is sometimes considered a separate species, the Comoros green pigeon (Treron comorensis). Its natural habitats are subtropical or tropical dry forest and subtropical or tropical moist lowland forest.

== Taxonomy ==
In 1760 the French zoologist Mathurin Jacques Brisson included a description of the Madagascar green pigeon in his Ornithologie based on specimen that he had examined. He used the French name Le pigeon ramier verd de Madagascar and the Latin Palumbus viridis madagascariensis. The species was also illustrated in Edme-Louis Daubenton's Planches Enluminées D'Histoire Naturelle. Although Brisson coined Latin names, these do not conform to the binomial system and are not recognised by the International Commission on Zoological Nomenclature. When the Swedish naturalist Carl Linnaeus revised his Mantissa Plantarum in 1771 he added an appendix which included a description of the Madagascar green pigeon. He coined the binomial name Columba australis and cited the earlier authors. The specific epithet australis is the Latin word for "southern". The species is now placed in the genus Treron that was introduced in 1816 by the French ornithologist Louis Pierre Vieillot.

Two subspecies are recognised:

- T. a. xenius Salomonsen, 1934 – west Madagascar
- T. a. australis (Linnaeus, 1771) – east Madagascar
