= List of Columbiformes by population =

This is a list of Columbiformes species by global population. While numbers are estimates, they have been made by the experts in their fields. For more information on how these estimates were ascertained, see Wikipedia's articles on population biology and population ecology.

This list is not comprehensive, as not all Columbiformes have had their populations quantified.

The IOC World Bird List (version 15.1) recognizes 352 species of Columbiformes, 13 of which are extinct. This list follows IUCN classifications for species names and taxonomy. Where IUCN classifications differ from other ornithological authorities, alternative names and taxonomies are noted.

Some members of Columbiformes are extinct:

- Bonin wood pigeon (Columba versicolor) - last observed in 1889; extinct due to deforestation.
- Ryukyu wood pigeon (Columba jouyi) - last observed in 1936.
- Passenger pigeon (Ectopistes migratorius) - last wild bird was shot in 1900; last captive individual died in 1914.
- Rodrigues pigeon or Rodrigues turtle dove (Nesoenas rodericanus) - went extinct during the 18th century.
- Spotted green pigeon or Liverpool pigeon (Caloenas maculata) - known from one specimen, and not seen since 1928.
- Norfolk ground dove (Pampusana norfolkensis) - poorly described species, known only from subfossils. Extinct sometime after 1790. Not recognized by IUCN/BirdLife International.
- Tanna ground dove (Pampusana ferruginea) - last observed (only record for species) in 1774.
- Thick-billed ground dove (Pampusana salamonis) - last observed in 1927.
- Choiseul pigeon (Microgoura meeki) - last observed in 1904.
- Dodo (Raphus cucullatus) - extinct circa 1662.
- Rodrigues solitaire (Pezophaps solitaria) - extinct by end of 1760s.
- Red-moustached fruit dove (Ptilinopus mercierii) - last observed in 1922.
- Mauritius blue pigeon (Alectroenas nitidissimus) - extinct between 1832 - 1837.

== Species by global population ==
| Common name | Binomial name | Population | Status | Trend | Notes | Image |
|---|---|---|---|---|---|---|
| Purple-winged ground dove | Claravis geoffroyi | 0-49 | CR | ? | May be extinct. Only one sighting since 2008. | |
| Negros fruit dove | Ptilinopus arcanus | 0-49 | CR | ? | May be extinct. Last and only specimen collected in 1953. | |
| Silvery pigeon | Columba argentina | 1-49 | CR | ▼ | May be an underestimate, due to difficulty of identification. | |
| Sulu bleeding-heart | Gallicolumba menagei | 1-49 | CR | ? | May be extinct. Last and only specimens were collected in 1891. | |
| Tooth-billed pigeon | Didunculus strigirostris | 25-75 | CR | ▼ | Total population is estimated to be 50-150 individuals. | |
| Mindoro bleeding-heart | Gallicolumba platenae | 50-249 | CR | ▼ | Total population is estimated to be 70-400 individuals. | |
| Negros bleeding-heart | Gallicolumba keayi | 50-249 | CR | ▼ | Total population is estimated to be 70-400 individuals. | |
| Black-naped pheasant-pigeon | Otidiphaps insularis | 50-249 | CR | ▼ | IOC taxonomy maintains this species (O. n. insularis) as a subspecies of the pheasant pigeon (O. nobilis). | |
| Marquesan ground dove | Pampusana rubescens | 50-249 | EN | Steady | | |
| Blue-eyed ground dove | Columbina cyanopis | 70-180 | CR | ▼ | Total population is estimated to be 110-260 individuals. | |
| Rapa fruit dove | Ptilinopus huttoni | 97-162 | CR | ▼ | Total population is estimated to be 145-243 individuals. | |
| Grenada dove | Leptotila wellsi | 136-182 | CR | ▼ | | |
| Socorro dove | Zenaida graysoni | 150 | [[:Extinction|EW]] | N/A | Value is an approximate value of individuals in captivity. Not recorded in the wild since 1972. Re-introductions are planned. | |
| Polynesian ground dove | Pampusana erythroptera | 150 | CR | ▼ | Total population is estimated to be 200 individuals. | |
| Nuku Hiva imperial pigeon | Ducula galeata | 200-249 | EN | ▲ | Total population is estimated to be at least 300 individuals. | |
| Caroline Islands ground dove (White-fronted ground dove) | Pampusana kubaryi | 200-500 | EN | ▼ | Total population is estimated to be 312-715 individuals. | |
| Santa Cruz ground dove | Pampusana sanctaecrucis | 218-1,070 | EN | ▼ | Total population is estimated to be 300-1,600 individuals. | |
| Palau ground dove | Pampusana canifrons | 250-999 | EN | ▼ | Total population is likely lower than 500 individuals. | |
| Tuxtla quail-dove | Zentrygon carrikeri | 250-999 | EN | ▼ | Total population is estimated to be 350-1,500 individuals. | |
| Chatham Islands pigeon | Hemiphaga chathamensis | 250-999 | VU | ▲ | | |
| Pink pigeon | Nesoenas mayeri | 250-999 | VU | Steady | Total population is estimated to fall approximately between 300-500 individuals. | |
| Makatea fruit dove | Ptilinopus chalcurus | 300-1,500 | VU | Steady | Best estimate for number of mature individuals is 650-750. Total population is estimated to be approximately 1,000 individuals. | |
| Tawitawi brown dove | Phapitreron cinereiceps | 500-2,500 | EN | ▼ | | |
| Polynesian imperial pigeon | Ducula aurorae | 570-1,200 | EN | ▲ | Total population is estimated to be 867-1,677 individuals. | |
| White-fronted quail-dove | Geotrygon leucometopia | 600-1,700 | EN | ▼ | Total population is estimated to be 1,000-2,499 individuals. | |
| Purple quail-dove | Geotrygon purpurata | 600-1,700 | EN | ▼ | Total population is estimated to be 1,000-2,499 individuals. | |
| Blue-headed quail-dove | Starnoenas cyanocephala | 600-1,700 | EN | ▼ | Total population is estimated to be 1,000-2,499 individuals. | |
| Timor green pigeon | Treron psittaceus | 660-2,000 | EN | ▼ | Total population is estimated to be 1,000-3,000 individuals. | |
| Mindoro imperial pigeon | Ducula mindorensis | 800-3,000 | NT | ? | Estimate is a preliminary and somewhat arbitrary, based on best guess of species density. | |
| Russet-crowned quail-dove | Zentrygon goldmani | 800-6,400 | NT | Steady | | |
| Vanuatu imperial pigeon | Ducula bakeri | 800-23,000 | LC | ? | Best estimate for number of mature individuals in 2,500-23,000. Total population is estimated to be 1,200 - 35,000 individuals. | |
| Raiatea fruit dove | Ptilinopus chrysogaster | 1,000-2,499 | EN | ▼ | | |
| Comoro green pigeon | Treron griveaudi | 1,000-2,499 | EN | ▼ | | |
| New Britain bronzewing | Henicophaps foersteri | 1,000-2,499 | VU | ▼ | Total population is estimated to be less than 5,000 individuals. | |
| Rarotonga fruit dove (Lilac-crowned fruit dove) | Ptilinopus rarotongensis | 1,000-2,499 | NT | Steady | Total population is estimated to be 560-3,400 individuals. | |
| White-tailed laurel pigeon (Laurel pigeon) | Columba junoniae | 1,000-2,500 | NT | ? | Total population is estimated to be 1,500-3,800 individuals, though this may be an underestimate. | |
| Plain pigeon | Patagioenas inornata | 1,000-4,100 | NT | ▼ | Total population is estimated to be 1,500-6,100 individuals. | |
| Chestnut-bellied imperial pigeon | Ducula brenchleyi | 1,100-19,999 | NT | ▼ | | |
| Spotted imperial pigeon | Ducula carola | 1,200-3,200 | VU | ▼ | Best estimate for number of mature individuals is 2,000-3,200. | |
| Taiwan green pigeon | Treron formosae | 1,250-2,000 | NT | ▼ | | |
| Wetar ground dove | Pampusana hoedtii | 1,500-7,000 | EN | ▼ | Total population is estimated to be 2,500-9,999 individuals. | |
| Grey-fronted quail-dove | Geotrygon caniceps | 1,500-7,000 | VU | ▼ | Total population is estimated to be 2,500-9,999 individuals. | |
| Comoro olive pigeon | Columba pollenii | 1,500-7,000 | NT | ▼ | Total population is estimated to be 2,500-9,999 individuals. | |
| Yellow-legged pigeon | Columba pallidiceps | 2,500-9,999 | VU | ▼ | | |
| Pale-capped pigeon | Columba punicea | 2,500-9,999 | VU | ▼ | Total population is estimated to be 3,500-15,000 individuals. | |
| Sri Lanka wood pigeon | Columba torringtoniae | 2,500-9,999 | VU | ▼ | Total population is estimated to be 3,500-15,000 individuals. | |
| Western crowned pigeon | Goura cristata | 2,500-9,999 | VU | ▼ | Total population is estimated to be 3,500-15,000 individuals. | |
| Scheepmaker's crowned pigeon | Goura scheepmakeri | 2,500-9,999 | VU | ▼ | The southern crowned pigeon has been split into this species and Sclater's crowned pigeon (G. sclateri). | |
| Ochre-bellied dove | Leptotila ochraceiventris | 2,500-9,999 | VU | ▼ | Total population is estimated to be 3,500-15,000 individuals. | |
| Ring-tailed pigeon | Patagioenas caribaea | 2,500-9,999 | VU | ▼ | Total population is estimated to be 3,500-15,000 individuals. | |
| Dark-eared brown dove (Mindanao brown dove) | Phapitreron brunneiceps | 2,500-9,999 | VU | ▼ | | |
| Carunculated fruit dove | Ptilinopus granulifrons | 2,500-9,999 | VU | ▼ | | |
| Flores green pigeon | Treron floris | 2,500-9,999 | VU | ▼ | Total population is estimated to be 3,500-15,000 individuals. | |
| Pemba green pigeon | Treron pembaensis | 2,500-9,999 | VU | ▼ | Total population is estimated to be 3,500-15,000 individuals, but this may be a large overestimate. | |
| Andaman wood pigeon | Columba palumboides | 2,500-9,999 | NT | ▼ | | |
| Enggano imperial pigeon | Ducula oenothorax | 2,500-9,999 | NT | Steady | Total population is estimated to be 3,500-15,000 individuals. | |
| Enggano cuckoo-dove | Macropygia cinnamomea | 2,500-9,999 | NT | ▼ | | |
| Peruvian pigeon (Maranon pigeon) | Patagioenas oenops | 2,500-9,999 | NT | ▼ | | |
| Black cuckoo-dove | Turacoena modesta | 2,500-9,999 | NT | ▼ | | |
| Grey-green fruit dove | Ptilinopus purpuratus | 2,500-9,999 | LC | ? | | |
| Dark-tailed laurel pigeon (Bolle's pigeon) | Columba bollii | 2,500-10,000 | LC | ▲ | | |
| Micronesian imperial pigeon | Ducula oceanica | 2,500-12,200 | VU | ▼ | Best estimate for number of mature individuals in 8,000. Total population is estimated to be 3,800-18,200 individuals | |
| São Tomé olive pigeon | Columba thomensis | 2,600-3,700 | EN | ▼ | Total population is estimated to be 3,893-5,497 individuals. | |
| Atoll fruit dove | Ptilinopus coralensis | 2,800-5,600 | NT | ▼ | Total population is estimated to be 4,200-8,400 individuals. | |
| Henderson Island fruit dove (Henderson fruit dove) | Ptilinopus insularis | 3,000-4,000 | VU | Steady | | |
| Whistling dove | Ptilinopus layardi | 3,000-10,000 | NT | ▼ | Total population is estimated to be 5,000-15,000 individuals. IUCN/BirdLife International give the binomial name Chrysoena viridis. | |
| Silver-capped fruit dove | Ptilinopus richardsii | 3,300-11,500 | LC | Steady | Precautionary estimate. | |
| Pink-bellied imperial pigeon | Ducula poliocephala | 5,000-15,000 | NT | ▼ | | |
| Luzon bleeding-heart | Gallicolumba luzonica | 5,000-25,000 | NT | ▼ | | |
| Cream-bellied fruit dove (Cream-breasted fruit dove) | Ptilinopus merrilli | 5,000-30,000 | NT | ▼ | IUCN/BirdLife International place species in genus Ramphiculus. | |
| Red-naped fruit dove | Ptilinopus dohertyi | 5,600-6,000 | VU | ▼ | | |
| Mariana fruit dove | Ptilinopus roseicapilla | 7,500-12,500 | NT | ▼ | Best estimate for number of mature individuals is 10,000. Total population is estimated to be 16,230 individuals. | |
| Timor imperial pigeon | Ducula cineracea | 7,500-20,000 | NT | ▼ | | |
| Grey imperial pigeon | Ducula pickeringii | 7,500-26,500 | NT | ▼ | Total population is estimated to be 9,300-33,000 individuals. | |
| Flame-breasted fruit dove | Ptilinopus marchei | 8,000-15,000 | NT | ▼ | IUCN/BirdLife International place species in genus Ramphiculus. | |
| Mindanao bleeding-heart | Gallicolumba crinigera | >10,000 | VU | ▼ | Population has not been formally estimated, but is "likely to exceed 10,000 mature individuals". | |
| Andaman green pigeon | Treron chloropterus | >10,000 | NT | ▼ | Highly uncertain estimate, given unknown impacts of hunting on population. | |
| Madeira laurel pigeon (Trocaz pigeon) | Columba trocaz | 10,000-14,000 | LC | Steady | | |
| Sumba green pigeon | Treron teysmannii | 10,000-15,000 | NT | ▼ | | |
| Yellow-eyed pigeon | Columba eversmanni | 10,000-19,999 | VU | ▼ | Total population is estimated to be 15,000-30,000 individuals. | |
| Large green pigeon | Treron capellei | 10,000-19,999 | VU | ▼ | Preliminary estimate. | |
| Finsch's imperial pigeon | Ducula finschii | 10,000-19,999 | NT | ▼ | Total population is estimated to be 15,000-30,000 individuals. | |
| Victoria crowned pigeon | Goura victoria | 10,000-19,999 | NT | ▼ | | |
| Tolima dove | Leptotila conoveri | 10,000-19,999 | NT | ▼ | Total population is estimated to be 16,000-44,000 individuals. | |
| White-throated ground dove | Pampusana xanthonura | 10,000-19,999 | NT | ? | | |
| Pied cuckoo-dove | Reinwardtoena browni | 10,000-19,999 | NT | ▼ | Total population is estimated to be 15,000-30,000 individuals. | |
| Buru green pigeon | Treron aromaticus | 10,000-19,999 | NT | ▼ | | |
| Nilgiri wood pigeon | Columba elphinstonii | 10,000-50,000 | LC | ? | | |
| Olive-backed quail-dove | Leptotrygon veraguensis | 20,000-49,999 | LC | ▼ | | |
| Chiriquí quail-dove | Zentrygon chiriquensis | 20,000-49,999 | LC | ▼ | | |
| Buff-fronted quail-dove | Zentrygon costaricensis | 20,000-49,999 | LC | ▼ | | |
| Purplish-backed quail-dove | Zentrygon lawrencii | 20,000-49,999 | LC | ▼ | | |
| Buru mountain pigeon | Gymnophaps mada | 20,000-50,000 | LC | Steady | | |
| São Tomé green pigeon | Treron sanctithomae | 24,670-72,840 | EN | ▼ | Total population is estimated to be 37,007-109,255 individuals. | |
| Christmas Island imperial pigeon (Christmas imperial pigeon) | Ducula whartoni | 35,000-66,000 | LC | Steady | Best estimate for mature individuals is 50,000. | |
| Bridled quail-dove | Geotrygon mystacea | 36,000-240,000 | LC | ▼ | Total population is estimated to be 45,000-300,000 individuals. | |
| Yellowish imperial pigeon | Ducula subflavescens | 38,000-249,000 | NT | ▼ | Total population is estimated to be 57,000-373,000 individuals. | |
| Brown-backed dove (Azuero dove) | Leptotila battyi | 50,000-99,999 | VU | ▼ | | |
| Blue-capped fruit dove | Ptilinopus monacha | 50,000-99,999 | LC | ▼ | Total population is estimated to be 150,000 individuals. | |
| Violaceous quail-dove | Geotrygon violacea | 50,000-499,999 | LC | ▼ | | |
| Grey-chested dove | Leptotila cassinii | 50,000-499,999 | LC | ▼ | | |
| Caribbean dove | Leptotila jamaicensis | 50,000-499,999 | LC | ▼ | | |
| Grey-headed dove | Leptotila plumbeiceps | 50,000-499,999 | LC | ▼ | | |
| Maroon-chested ground dove | Paraclaravis mondetoura | 50,000-499,999 | LC | ▼ | | |
| White-faced quail-dove | Zentrygon albifacies | 50,000-499,999 | LC | ▼ | | |
| Ruddy quail-dove | Geotrygon montana | 50,000-500,000 | LC | ▼ | | |
| Short-billed pigeon | Patagioenas nigrirostris | 50,000-500,000 | LC | ▼ | | |
| Partridge pigeon | Geophaps smithii | 81,800-145,400 | LC | ▼ | Best estimate for number of mature individuals is 116,500. Populations given for two subspecies: G. smithii smithi (108,000) & G. smithii blaauwi (8,500). | |
| Cloven-feathered dove | Drepanoptila holosericea | 100,000-140,000 | LC | ▼ | Total population is estimated to be > 140,000 individuals. | |
| New Caledonian imperial pigeon (Goliath imperial pigeon) | Ducula goliath | 100,000-220,000 | NT | ▼ | | |
| Red-knobbed imperial pigeon | Ducula rubricera | 150,000-750,000 | LC | ▼ | Tentative estimate based on assumption that suitable habitat is 25-40% occupied. | |
| Spectacled imperial pigeon | Ducula perspicillata | 500,000-999,999 | LC | ▼ | | |
| Grey-fronted dove | Leptotila rufaxilla | 500,000-4,999,999 | LC | ▼ | Values given are for total population. | |
| Zenaida dove | Zenaida aurita | 500,000-4,999,999 | LC | Steady | | |
| Blue ground dove | Claravis pretiosa | 500,000-5,000,000 | LC | ▼ | | |
| Plain-breasted ground dove | Columbina minuta | 500,000-5,000,000 | LC | Steady | | |
| Scaled pigeon | Patagioenas speciosa | 500,000-5,000,000 | LC | ▼ | | |
| White-crowned pigeon | Patagioenas leucocephala | 550,000 | NT | ▼ | | |
| Stock dove | Columba oenas | 1,700,000-2,860,000 | LC | ▲ | | |
| Red-billed pigeon | Patagioenas flavirostris | 2,000,000 | LC | ▼ | | |
| Laughing dove | Spilopelia senegalensis | 2,400,000-8,200,000 | LC | Steady | Preliminary estimate extrapolating from European population data. | |
| Inca dove | Columbina inca | 4,700,000 | LC | ▼ | | |
| Ruddy ground dove | Columbina talpacoti | 5,000,000-50,000,000 | LC | ▲ | | |
| Pale-vented pigeon | Patagioenas cayennensis | 5,000,000-50,000,000 | LC | ▼ | | |
| Ruddy pigeon | Patagioenas subvinacea | 5,000,000-50,000,000 | LC | ▼ | | |
| Northern band-tailed pigeon (Band-tailed pigeon) | Patagioenas fasciata | 6,100,000 | LC | ▲ | IUCN/BirdLife International split the band-tailed pigeon into two species, this one and southern band-tailed pigeon (P. albilinea). IOC taxonomy maintains both within P. fasciata. | |
| Common ground dove | Columbina passerina | 11,000,000 | LC | Steady | | |
| European turtle dove | Streptopelia turtur | 12,800,000 - 47,600,000 | VU | ▼ | | |
| White-winged dove | Zenaida asiatica | 14,000,000 | LC | ▲ | | |
| White-tipped dove | Leptotila verreauxi | 20,000,000 | LC | Steady | | |
| Eurasian collared dove | Streptopelia decaocto | 40,000,000-75,000,000 | LC | ▲ | Total population is estimated to be 60-110 million individuals. Includes population in introduced range. | |
| Common wood pigeon | Columba palumbus | 51,000,000-73,000,000 | LC | ▲ | Preliminary estimate extrapolating from European population data. | |
| Rock dove | Columba livia | 140,000,000 | LC | ? | Value given is for total population, which includes feral pigeon populations. | |
| Mourning dove | Zenaida macroura | 120,000,000-140,000,000 | LC | ▼ | | |

== Species without population estimates ==
| Common name | Binomial name | Population | Status | Trend | Notes | Image |
|---|---|---|---|---|---|---|
| White-naped pheasant-pigeon | Otidiphaps aruensis | unknown | VU | ▼ | IOC taxonomy maintains this species (O. n. aruensis) as a subspecies of the pheasant pigeon (O. nobilis). | |
| Sclater's crowned pigeon | Goura sclaterii | unknown | NT | ▼ | The southern crowned pigeon has been split into this species and Scheepmaker's crowned pigeon (G.scheepmakeri). | |
| Grey-naped pheasant-pigeon | Otidiphaps cervicalis | unknown | LC | ▼ | IOC taxonomy maintains this species (O. n. cervicalis) as a subspecies of the pheasant pigeon (O. nobilis). | |
| Green-naped pheasant-pigeon | Otidiphaps nobilis | unknown | LC | ▼ | IOC taxonomy maintains this species (O. n. nobilis) as a subspecies of the pheasant pigeon (O. nobilis). | |
| Shy ground dove | Pampusana stairi | unknown | LC | ▼ | Population may be ~10,000 mature individuals, but recent surveys have failed to find numbers to support this; likely lower. | |

== See also ==
- Lists of birds by population
- Lists of organisms by population
