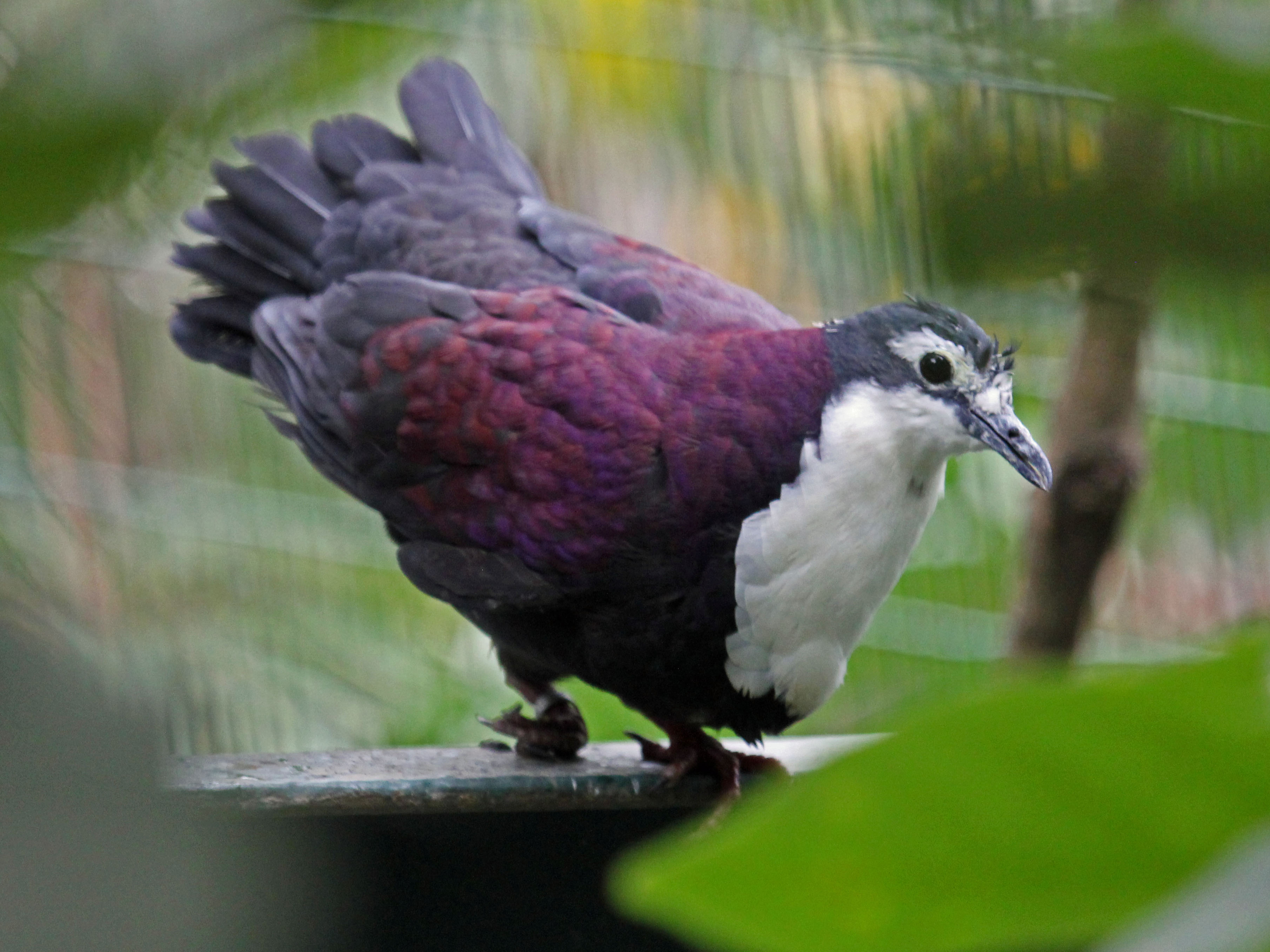
- White-breasted ground dove (Pampusana jobiensis)

Scientific classification
- Kingdom: Animalia
- Phylum: Chordata
- Class: Aves
- Order: Columbiformes
- Family: Columbidae
- Genus: Pampusana; Bonaparte, 1855

Diversity
- 10 living species

Synonyms
- Alopecoenas Sharpe, 1899

= Pampusana =

Genus of birds

Pampusana is a genus of mid-sized, ground-dwelling doves (family Columbidae), comprising 13 species, which occur in rainforests in the Pacific region. They are not closely related to the American ground doves (genus Columbina and related genera).

== Systematics and extinctions ==
This genus was previously named Alopecoenas Sharpe, 1899, but Pampusana Bonaparte, 1855 has priority. Pampusana might be ranked as a (very small) subfamily, but the available data suggests that they are better considered as part of a basal radiation of Columbidae which consists of many small and often bizarre lineages; for example, Goura and Otidiphaps which are ecologically convergent to Galliformes, and maybe even the famous didines (Raphinae). Currently about 10 species of Pampusana are extant. Of the larger genera of Columbidae, Pampusana is the one most affected by extinction: 3–4 species have disappeared since the 18th century, and most of the remaining are decreasing in numbers, threatened with extinction or have lost subspecies due to habitat destruction, invasive species, or overhunting. In addition, there are several species which were never studied alive but known from subfossil bones. These became extinct during prehistory of the Southern Pacific region (c. 13000 BC – 1400 BC).

The bones of Pampusana are distinct enough to usually recognize this genus with ease. Still, the evolutionary affiliation of extinct species is often uncertain. A considerable number of recognizably distinct now-extinct Polynesian taxa used to inhabit the area where the white-headed lineage (P. jobiensis, P. erythroptera) and the Melanesian expansion that brought about P. sanctaecrucis and P. stairi (and possibly P. rubescens) would have met.

These ground-doves were removed from Gallicolumba (which was non-monophyletic) and reassigned here.

== List of species ==
The genus contains 13 species of which 3 became extinct in historical times:

- Wetar ground dove, Pampusana hoedtii
- White-breasted ground dove, Pampusana jobiensis
- White-fronted ground dove, Pampusana kubaryi
- Polynesian ground dove, Pampusana erythroptera
- White-throated ground dove, Pampusana xanthonura
- † Norfolk ground dove, Pampusana norfolkensis - extinct (c.1800)
- Shy ground dove, Pampusana stairi
- Santa Cruz ground dove, Pampusana sanctaecrucis
- † Tanna ground dove, Pampusana ferruginea - extinct (late 18th-19th century)
- † Thick-billed ground dove, Pampusana salamonis - extinct (mid-20th century)
- Marquesan ground dove, Pampusana rubescens
- Bronze ground dove, Pampusana beccarii
- Palau ground dove, Pampusana canifrons

A further 4 species became extinct in prehistoric times:

- † Rota ground dove, Gallicolumba sp. - prehistoric
- † Great ground dove, Pampusana nui - prehistoric
- † Henderson ground dove, Pampusana leonpascoi - prehistoric
- † New Caledonian ground dove, Pampusana longitarsus - prehistoric
