= New Caledonian ground dove =

New Caledonian ground dove Temporal range: Late Holocene

Scientific classification
- Kingdom: Animalia
- Phylum: Chordata
- Class: Aves
- Order: Columbiformes
- Family: Columbidae
- Genus: Pampusana
- Species: P. longitarsus

Binomial name
- Pampusana longitarsus (Balouet & Olson, 1989)

Synonyms
- Gallicolumba longitarsus Balouet & Olson, 1989; Alopecoenas longitarsus

Extinct species of bird

The New Caledonian ground dove (Pampusana longitarsus) is a large, extinct species of Pampusana ground dove in the pigeon family, and the largest member of its genus. It was endemic to the island of New Caledonia in Melanesia in the south-west Pacific region. It was described from subfossil bones found at the Pindai Caves paleontological site on the west coast of Grande Terre. The specific epithet refers to the slender and elongated tarsometatarsus, or lower leg bone, of the species.
