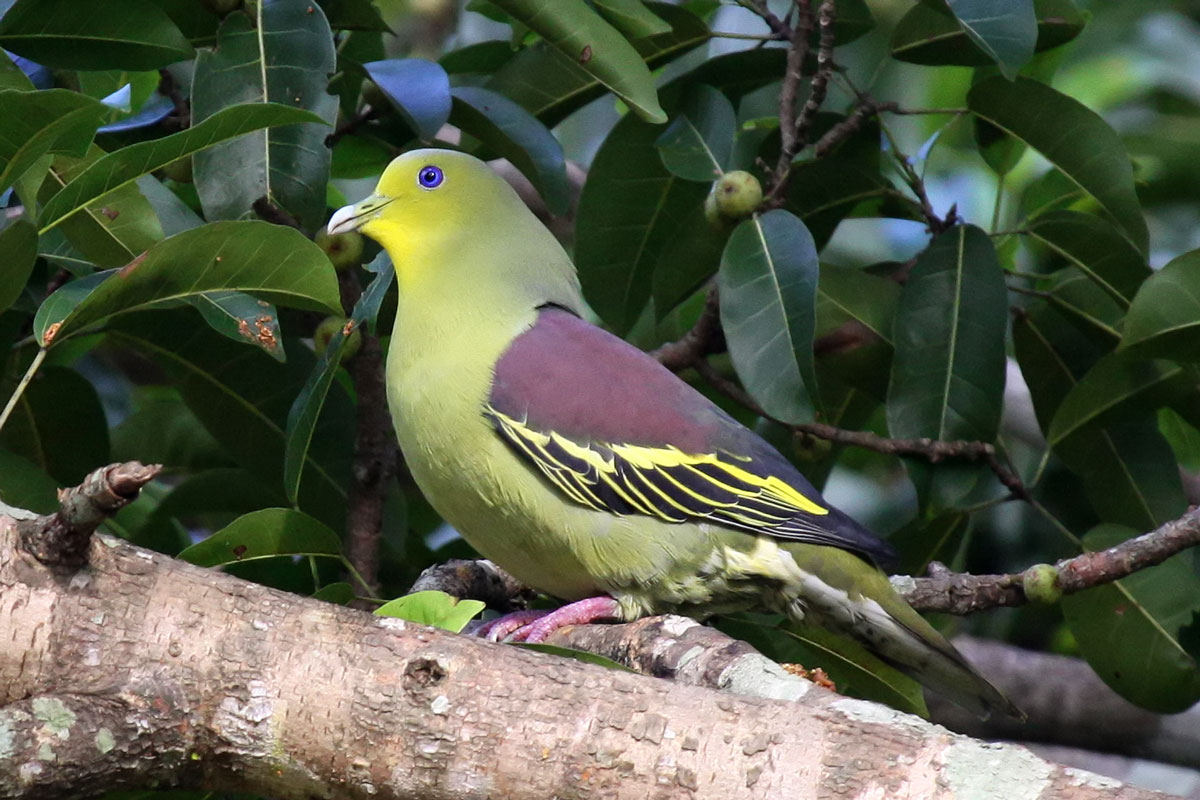
- Male of the nominate species, Sri Lanka green pigeon, in the Kaudulla National Park, Sri Lanka.

Conservation status
- Least Concern (IUCN 3.1)

Scientific classification
- Kingdom: Animalia
- Phylum: Chordata
- Class: Aves
- Order: Columbiformes
- Family: Columbidae
- Genus: Treron
- Species complex: Pompadour green pigeon species complex

= Pompadour green pigeon =

Species of bird

The pompadour green pigeon is a pigeon species complex. It is widespread in forests of southern and southeast Asia. Many authorities have split the pompadour green pigeon into multiple species, which are listed below:

== Distribution and habitat ==
It is a widespread group in forests of tropical southern Asia from India, Sri Lanka east to the Philippines and the Moluccas. In India, they are found as disjunct populations in the Western Ghats, some parts of the Eastern Ghats, Northeastern India and in the Andaman Islands.

== Taxonomy ==
The distribution of the pompadour green pigeon is peculiarly disjunct and several are distinctive, leading many authorities to split it into six species:

- Sri Lanka green pigeon (Treron pompadora) from Sri Lanka. Monotypic.
- Grey-fronted green pigeon (Treron affinis) from the Western Ghats in India. Monotypic.
- Andaman green pigeon (Treron chloropterus) from the Andamans and Nicobars. Monotypic.
- Ashy-headed green pigeon (Treron phayrei) from northeast India and Nepal, east to Yunnan in China, and south through Indochina (north of the Isthmus of Kra). Commonly considered monotypic, though some recognize the subspecies conoveri.
- Philippine green pigeon (Treron axillaris) from the Philippines. Includes the subspecies amadoni, canescens and everetti.
- Buru green pigeon (Treron aromaticus) from small islands in the Flores Sea and Buru, Indonesia. Monotypic.

== Description ==
The pompadour green pigeon complex are all stocky, medium-sized pigeons, 25 to 28 centimetres (9.8 to 11.0 in) in length, with some significantly larger than others (e.g., chloropterus is significantly larger than birds from the Asian mainland). The head is green to greenish-yellow, and the underparts are green, though males of the subspecies phayrei have a pale orange patch on the chest. The crown, including the forehead are usually grey, except in Sri Lanka green pigeons where the forehead is greenish-yellow. The undertail coverts are mainly whitish or pale yellowish, though they are deep cinnamon in males of affinis and phayrei. The wings are blackish with distinct yellow edging to the wing coverts and tertials. The mantle is dark green in the female and deep purplish-chestnut in the male. In most birds, this includes the "shoulder", but in males of aromaticus the "shoulder" is very dark grey and in males of chloropterus it is green. Furthermore, males of aromaticus and some members of the axillaris group have a grey band above the mantle.

The legs are reddish in most birds, but grey in the axillaris group. The eyes are maroon-red or deep to very light blue (depends on subspecies), and the bill is whitish-grey with a dull, pale greenish or bluish base, except in the axillaris group where the base is red.

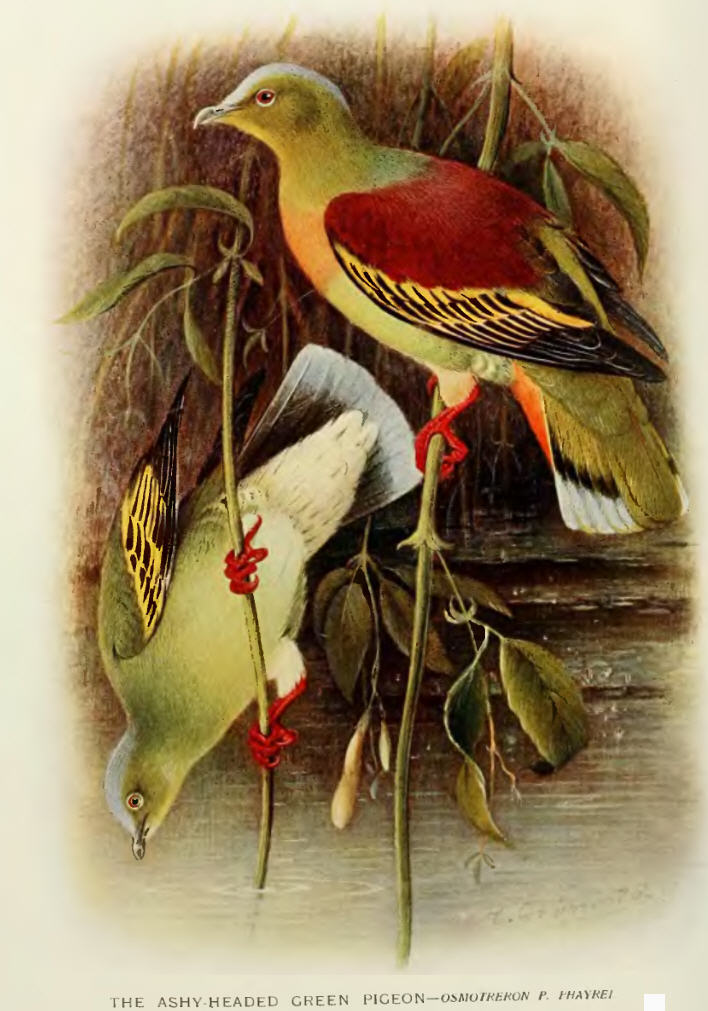
T. phayrei (male above, female below)

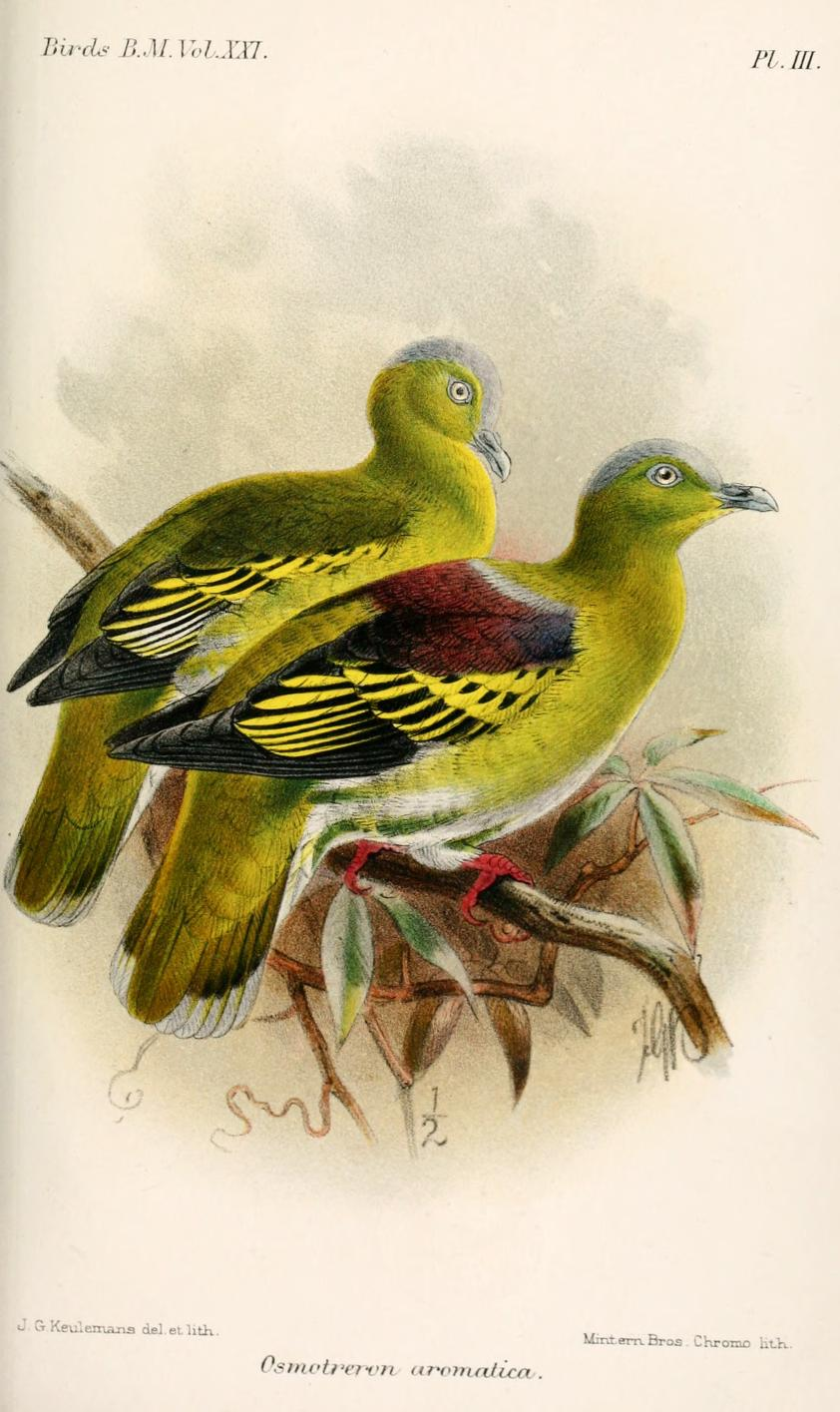
T. aromaticus (male in foreground, female behind)

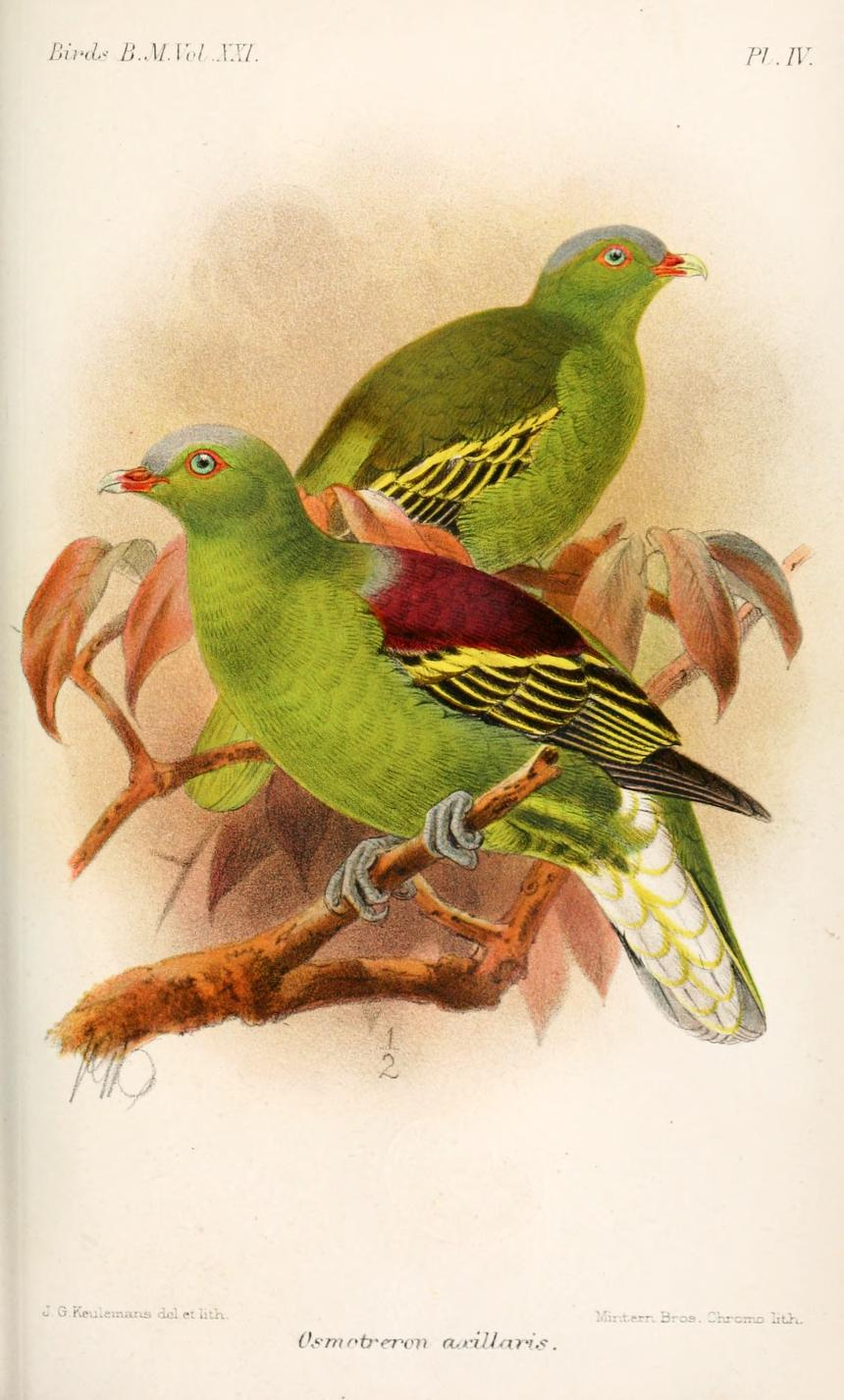
T. axillaris (male in foreground, female behind)

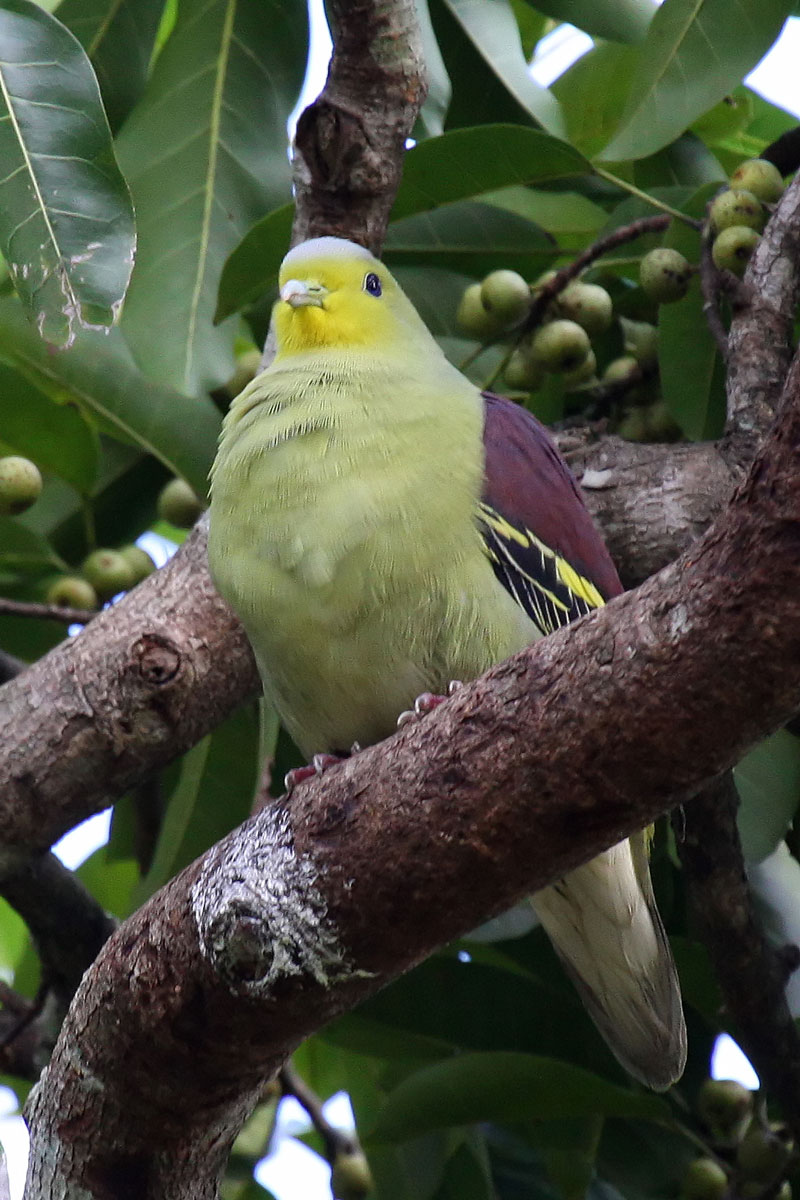
T. pompadora (male)

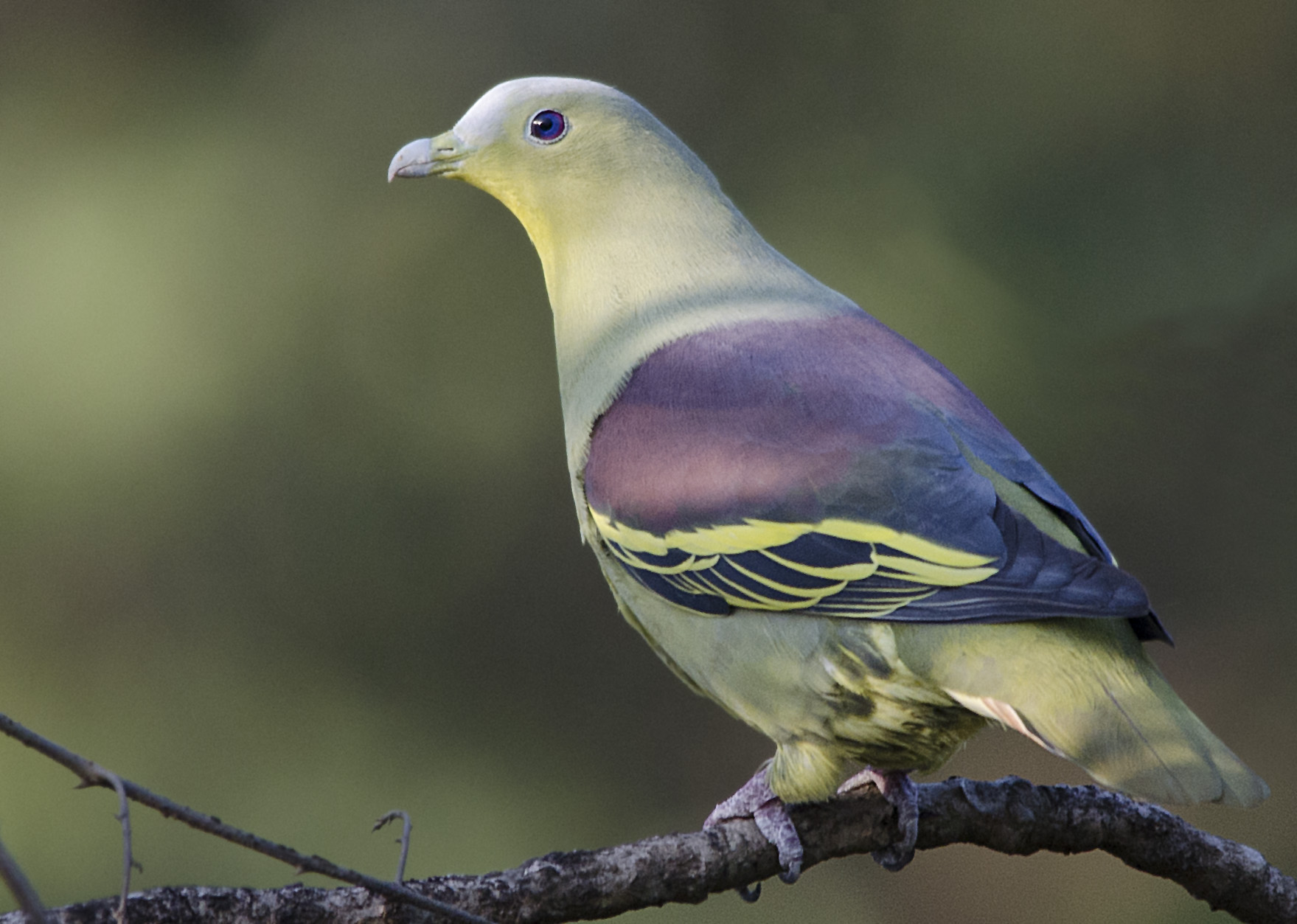
T. affinis (male)

== Behaviour ==
All species of the pompadour green pigeon complex usually occur singly or in small groups. Flight is fast and direct, with the regular beats and an occasional sharp flick of the wings that are characteristic of pigeons in general. They eat the seeds and fruits of a wide variety of plants. They build a stick nest in a tree and lay two white eggs.

== See also ==
- Pompadour (hairstyle)
