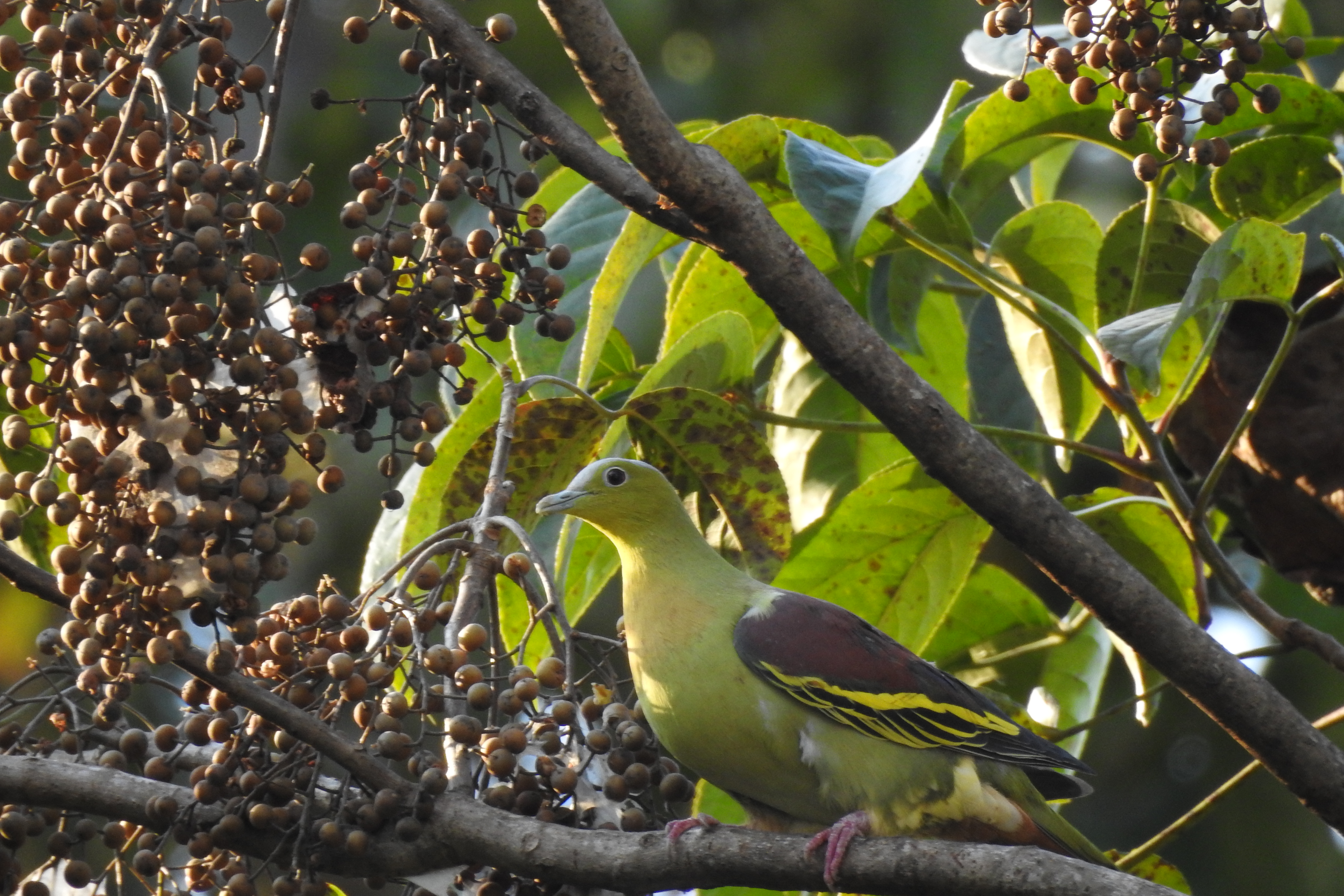
- Male from Pakke Tiger Reserve

Conservation status
- Near Threatened (IUCN 3.1)

Scientific classification
- Kingdom: Animalia
- Phylum: Chordata
- Class: Aves
- Order: Columbiformes
- Family: Columbidae
- Genus: Treron
- Species: T. phayrei

Binomial name
- Treron phayrei (Blyth, 1862)

Synonyms
- Osmotreron Phayrei (protonym)

= Ashy-headed green pigeon =

Species of bird

The ashy-headed green pigeon (Treron phayrei) is a pigeon in the genus Treron. It is found from Nepal, northeast India, and Bangladesh to southwest China, Myanmar, Thailand, Laos, and Vietnam. Many authorities split the species from the pompadour green pigeon complex. It has been added to the Red List of IUCN in 2014.

== Behaviour ==
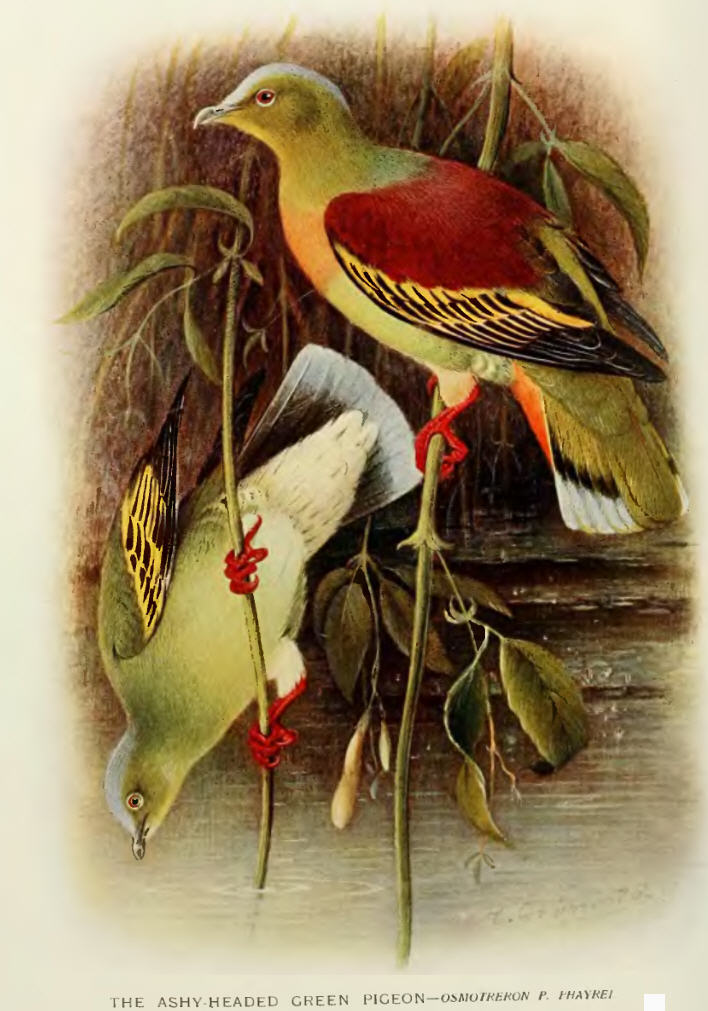

The ashy-headed green pigeon usually occurs singly or in small groups. Its flight is fast and direct, with the regular beats and an occasional sharp flick of the wings that are characteristic of pigeons in general. It eats the seeds and fruits of a wide variety of plants. It builds a stick nest in a tree and lays two white eggs.
