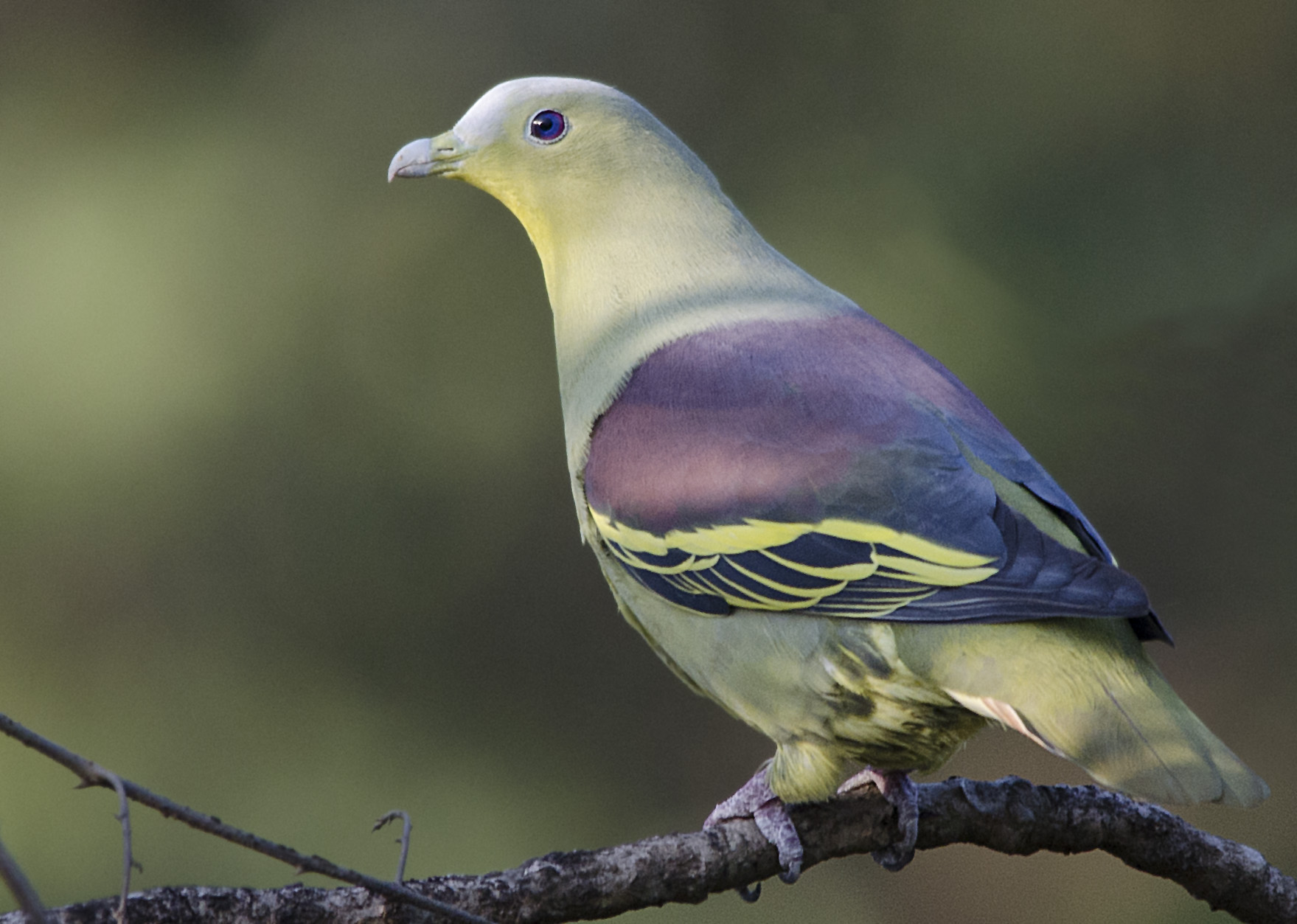
- Karnala Bird Sanctuary, India

Conservation status
- Least Concern (IUCN 3.1)

Scientific classification
- Kingdom: Animalia
- Phylum: Chordata
- Class: Aves
- Order: Columbiformes
- Family: Columbidae
- Genus: Treron
- Species: T. affinis

Binomial name
- Treron affinis (Jerdon, 1840)

= Grey-fronted green pigeon =

Species of bird

The grey-fronted green pigeon (Treron affinis) is a pigeon in the genus Treron. It is found in the forests of the Western Ghats in India. Many authorities have split the species from the pompadour green pigeon complex.

== Description ==
The male has a reddish mantle. The female has a green mantle.

== Behaviour ==
The grey-fronted green pigeon usually occurs singly or in small groups. Its flight is fast and direct, with the regular beats and an occasional sharp flick of the wings that are characteristic of pigeons in general. It eats the seeds and fruits of a wide variety of plants. It builds a stick nest in a tree and lays two white eggs.

== Gallery ==
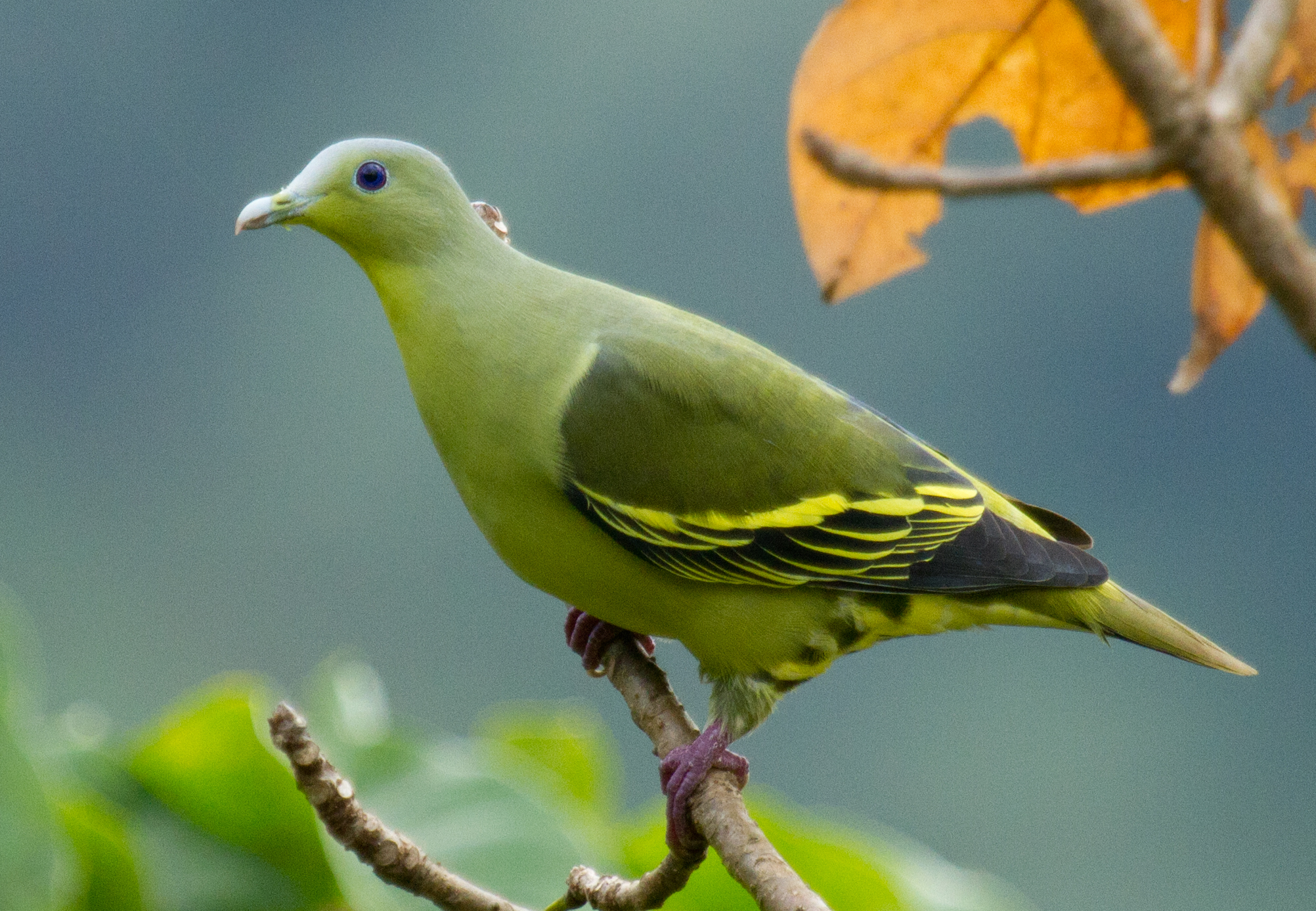
Female

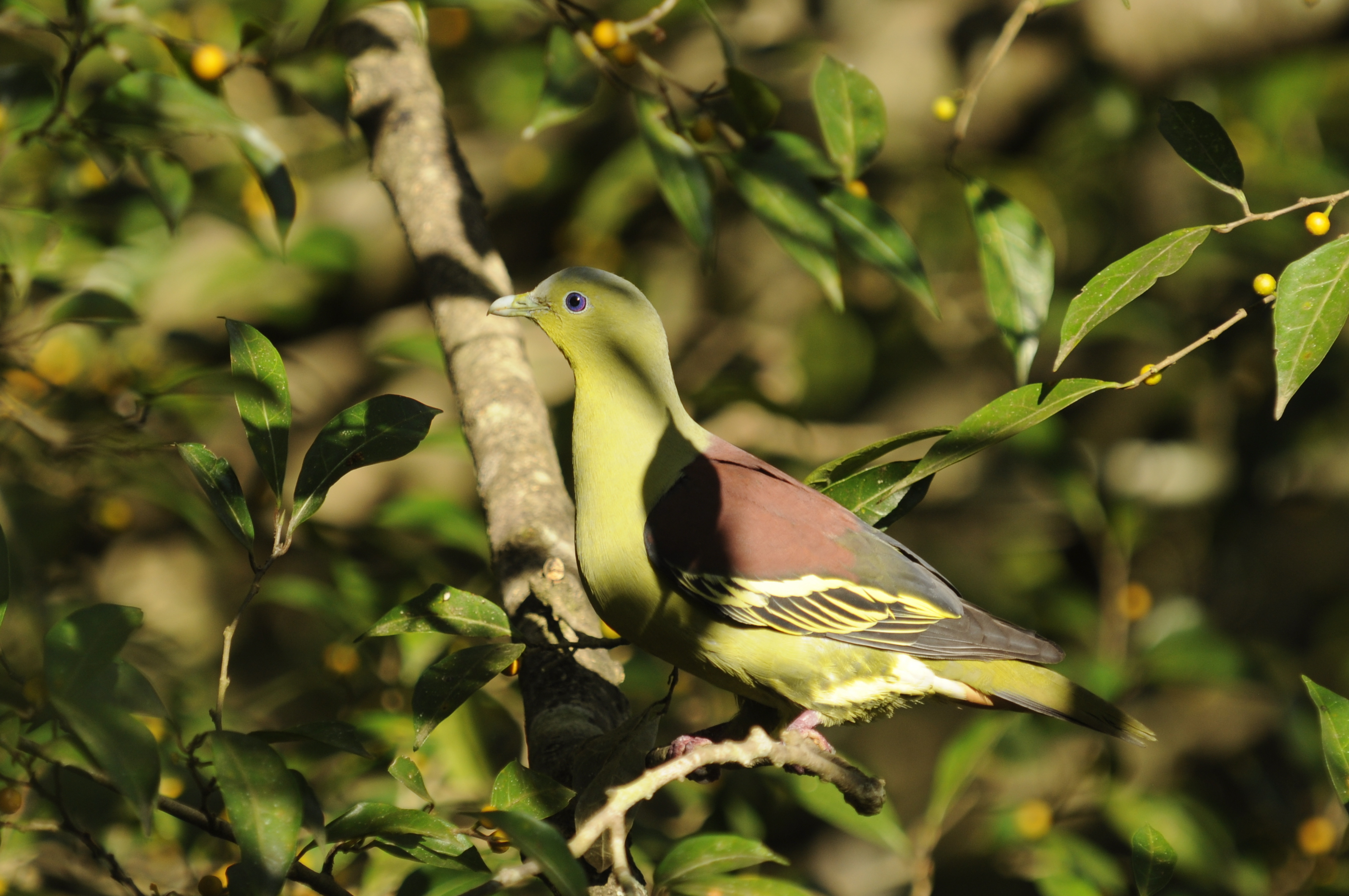
Male
