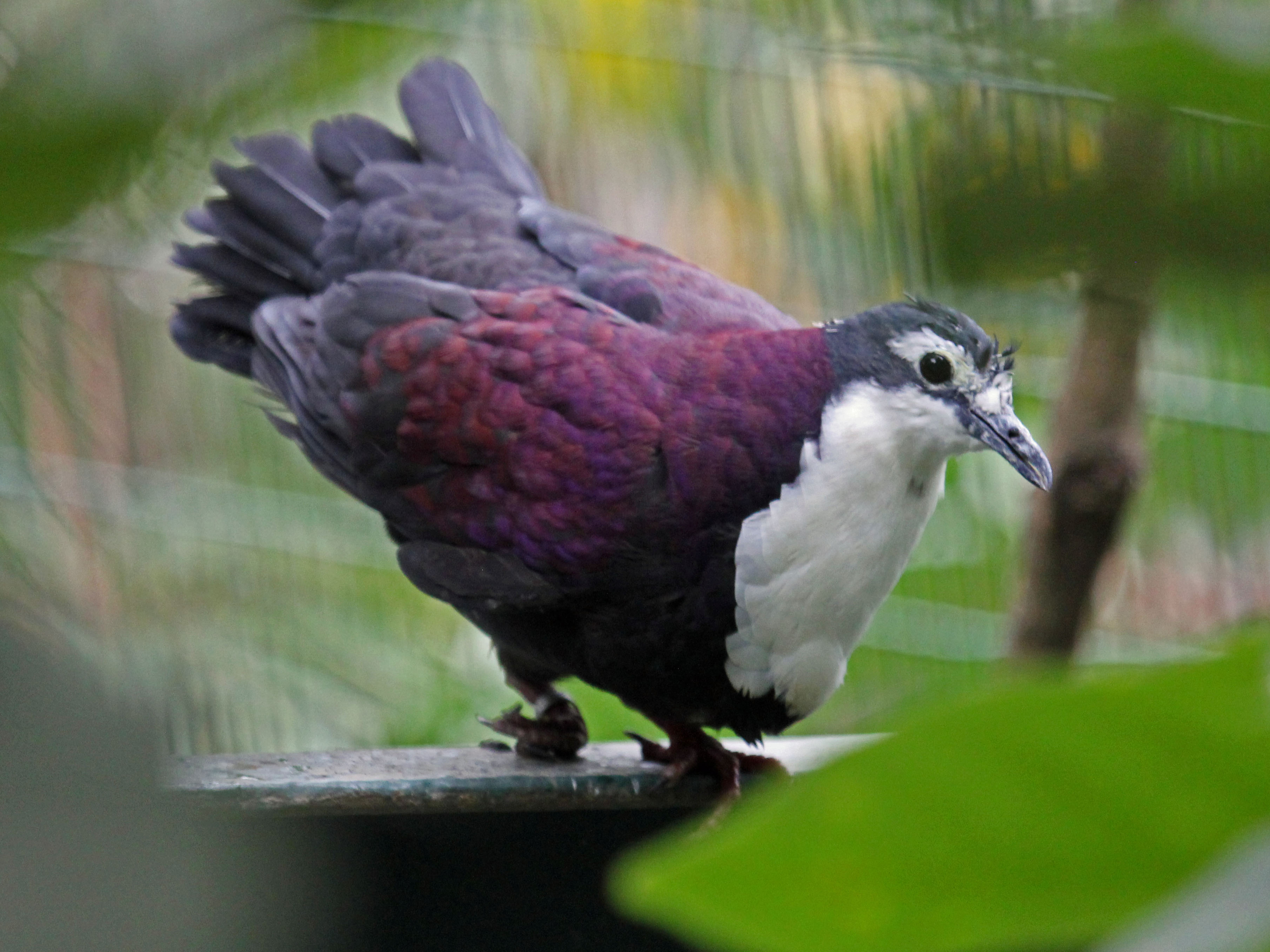
- At San Diego Zoo

Conservation status
- Least Concern (IUCN 3.1)

Scientific classification
- Kingdom: Animalia
- Phylum: Chordata
- Class: Aves
- Order: Columbiformes
- Family: Columbidae
- Genus: Pampusana
- Species: P. jobiensis

Binomial name
- Pampusana jobiensis (Meyer, 1875)

Synonyms
- Phlegoenas jobiensis Meyer, 1875; Gallicolumba jobiensis; Alopecoenas jobiensis

= White-breasted ground dove =

Species of bird

The white-breasted ground dove, white-bibbed ground dove, or purple ground dove (Pampusana jobiensis) is a species of bird in the family Columbidae. It is found in New Guinea, the Bismarck Archipelago and the Solomon Islands. Its natural habitats are subtropical or tropical moist lowland forest and subtropical or tropical moist montane forest.

This species was formerly in the genus Alopecoenas Sharpe, 1899, but the name of the genus was changed in 2019 to Pampusana Bonaparte, 1855 as this name has priority.

== Gallery ==
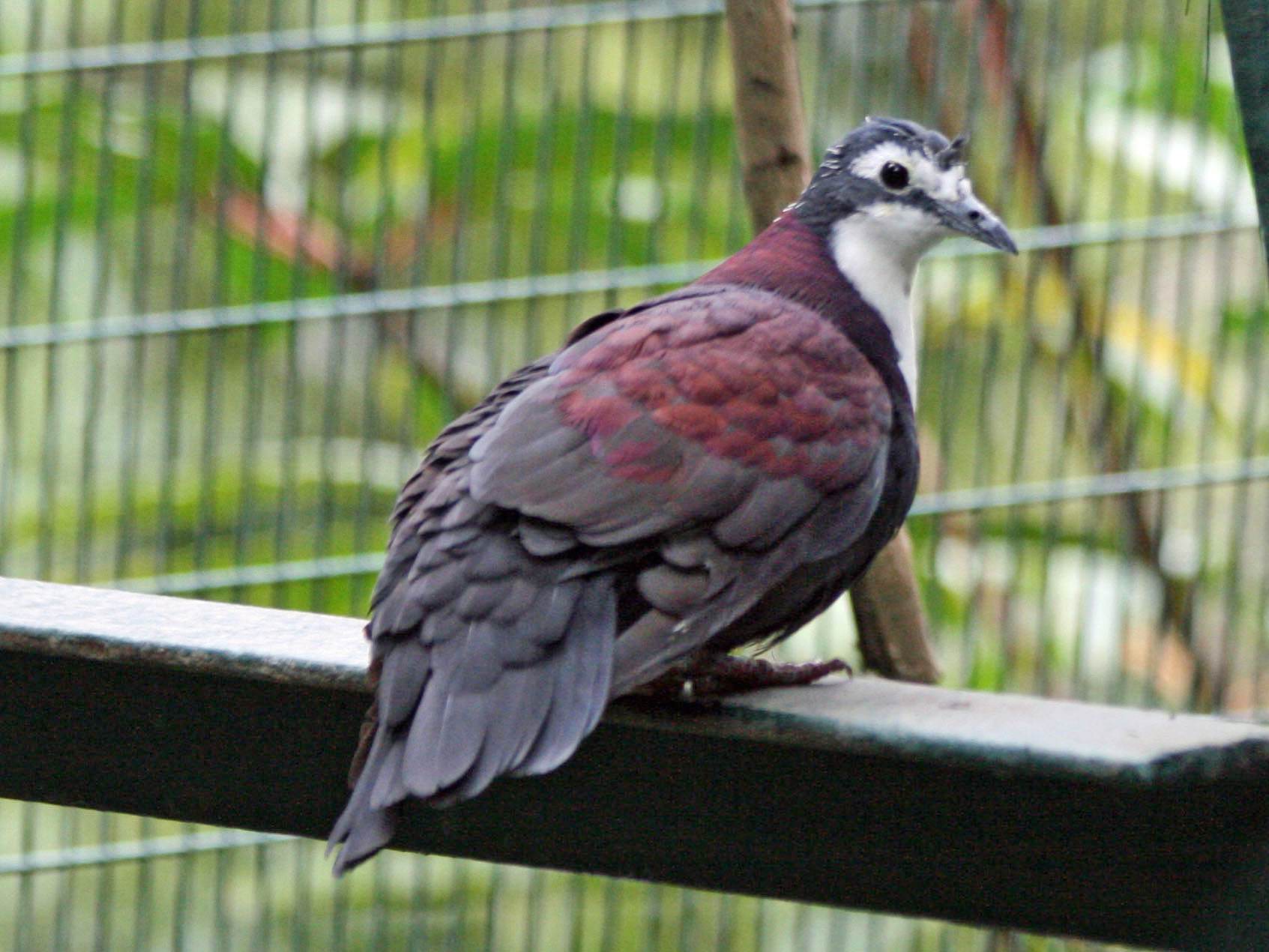
At San Diego Zoo

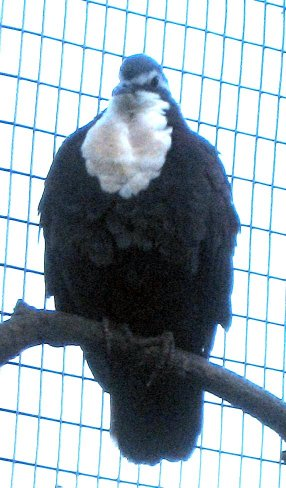
At Taronga Zoo, Sydney
