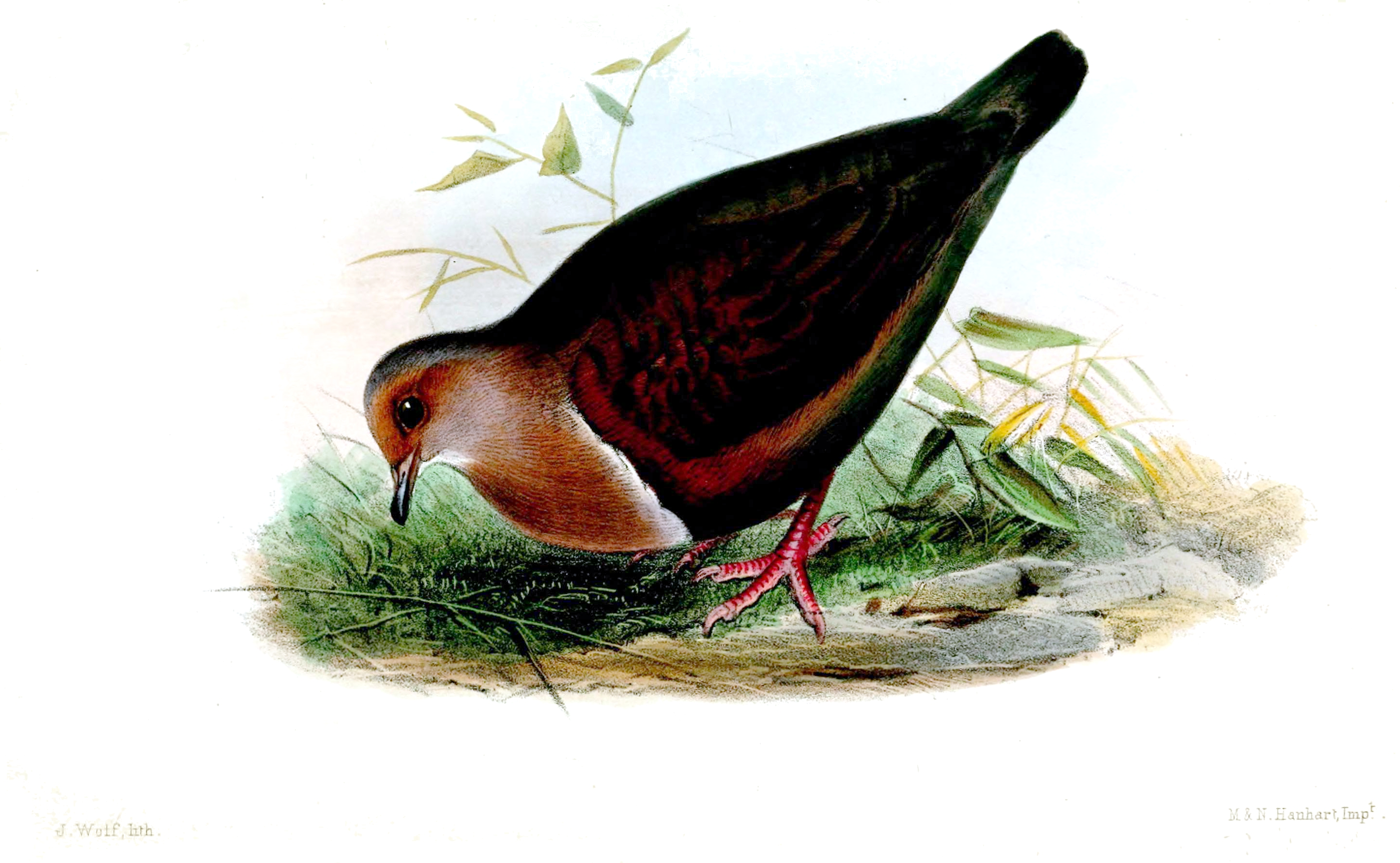

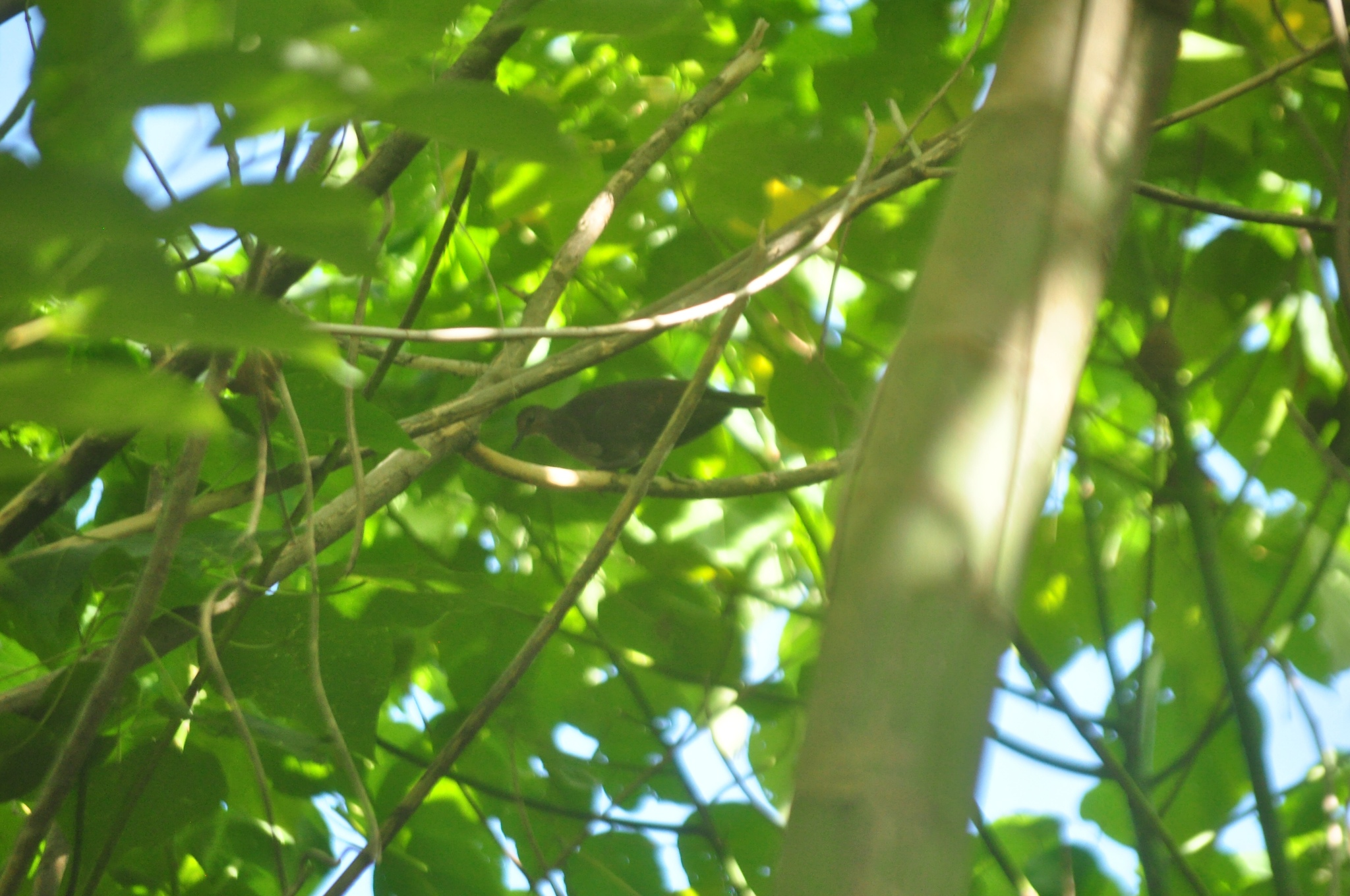

Conservation status
- Least Concern (IUCN 3.1)

- Endangered (ESA)

Scientific classification
- Kingdom: Animalia
- Phylum: Chordata
- Class: Aves
- Order: Columbiformes
- Family: Columbidae
- Genus: Pampusana
- Species: P. stairi

Binomial name
- Pampusana stairi (G. R. Gray, 1856)

Synonyms
- Caloenas (Phlegoenas) Stairi G. R. Gray, 1856; Alopecoenas stairi (G. R. Gray, 1856); Gallicolumba stairi (G. R. Gray, 1856); Phlegoenas vitiensis Finsch, 1872; Phlegoenas samoensis Finsch, 1872

= Shy ground dove =

Species of bird

The shy ground dove (Pampusana stairi), also known as the Tongan ground dove or friendly ground dove, is a species of bird in the family Columbidae, the pigeons and doves. This dove is found on islands in the South Pacific Ocean.

== Taxonomy ==
The shy ground dove was first formally described as Caloenas (Phlegoenas) Stairi by the English zoologist George Robert Gray with its type locality given as Samoa, but this probably means Tonga. This species was formerly in the genus Alopecoenas Sharpe, 1899, but the name of the genus was changed in 2019 to Pampusana Bonaparte, 1855 as this name has priority. The genus Pampusana is classified in the subfamily Raphinae, the Old World tropical pigeons and doves, in the family Columbidae which is the only family in the order Columbiformes.

The shy ground dove is a monotypic species with no currently recognised subspecies.

== Etymology ==
The shy ground dove is classified in the genus Pampusana, this name is derived from Columba pampusan Quoy & Gaimard, 1824, the etymology of pampusan is not known. The spscific name, stairi, honours the missionary to Samoa John Beveridge Stair who deposited a skin of this species in the British Museum (Natural History).

== Description ==
The shy ground dove is a plump ground-dwelling dove with short legs that typically escapes by running rather than flying when frightened. The male has dark purple back and wings, this colour extending onto the belly, with a whitish crescent on the pale grey breast, the head also being pale grey. The females normally resemblethe males, though some may have purplish-brown bodies with a very reddish breast and head.

== Distribution and habitat ==
The shy ground dove is found on islands in the South Pacific and is found on Fiji, Tonga, Samoa, American Samoa and Wallis and Futuna. On smaller islands it is found in scrub and stands of bamboowhile on larger islands it occurs in lowland and montane forest, on these islands it can also be found in disturbed habitats with little undergrowth.
