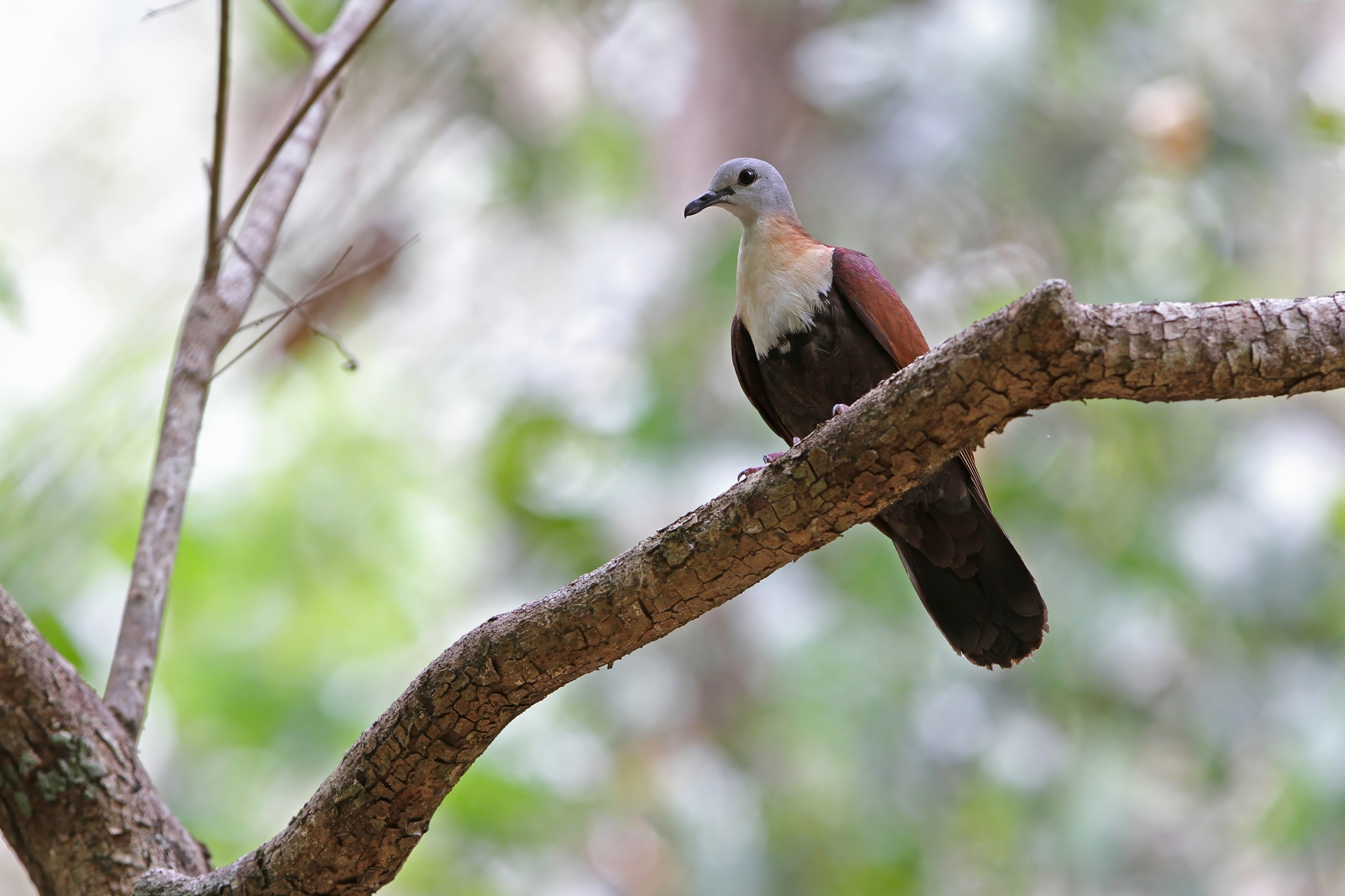

Conservation status
- Endangered (IUCN 3.1)

Scientific classification
- Kingdom: Animalia
- Phylum: Chordata
- Class: Aves
- Order: Columbiformes
- Family: Columbidae
- Genus: Pampusana
- Species: P. hoedtii

Binomial name
- Pampusana hoedtii (Schlegel, 1871)

Synonyms
- Leptoptila hoedtii Schlegel, 1871; Gallicolumba hoedtii; Alopecoenas hoedtii

= Wetar ground dove =

Species of bird

The Wetar ground dove (Pampusana hoedtii) is a species of bird in the family Columbidae found on Wetar, Indonesia, and on Timor. Its natural habitats are monsoon forests and gallery forests, and possibly woodland and bamboos. Threatened by habitat loss and hunting, the species is assessed as endangered by the IUCN.

== Taxonomy ==
In 1871, Hermann Schlegel described the species as Leptoptila hoedtii from Wetar. The species is monotypic. It has been moved from the genus Gallicolumba to Alopecoenas Sharpe, 1899. The name of the genus was changed in 2019 to Pampusana Bonaparte, 1855 as this name has priority. The specific epithet is derived from Dirk Samuel Hoedt, a Dutch collector who owned plantations in the East Indies.

== Description ==
Body length is about 27 cm (11 in) long. The male bird has a blue-grey head and a greyish white throat. The breast is pale cream, and the belly is blackish. The hindneck is reddish brown. The back and rump are rufous. Tail feathers are dark olive-brown, and there is a purple patch on the sides of the breast and the lesser covert feathers. The beak is black, and the feet are reddish violet. The female's head, neck and breast are rusty chestnut. Its upperparts and belly are olive-brown.

== Distribution and habitat ==
The species is found in Wetar and Timor. Fewer than 20 birds were collected on Wetar around 1900, and there were many records in 2008 and 2009. In Timor-Leste, four or five birds were recorded near the border with Indonesia in 2005. There are records from only three localities in West Timor. It is found at elevations up to 950 m (3,120 ft). Its habitats are monsoon forests and gallery forests, and possibly woodland and bamboos.

== Behaviour ==
The Wetar ground dove has been observed eating Ficus fruits on the ground. It appears to breed in the dry season, nesting in the canopy. It has been recorded calling from the canopy, giving a soft whu-wup call, sometimes with a du du-wup before it or a trrr after it.

== Status ==
The population size on Wetar is estimated to be less than 10,000 birds and may be less than 3000. The global population size of the Wetar ground dove is estimated at 1500–7000 mature individuals, or 2500–9999 total individuals. The population is rapidly declining. Threats to the species include habitat loss and hunting. There is much habitat destruction and hunting on Timor. On Wetar, there is less hunting because of the island's inaccessibility, but forest clearance may threaten the species. Mining and road-building may also increase. The International Union for Conservation of Nature has assessed its conservation status as endangered. Protected areas in West Timor and Wetar have been proposed.
