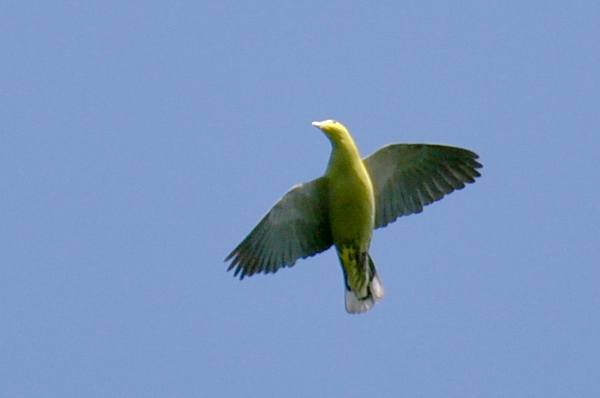
- in flight, North Andaman Island

Conservation status
- Near Threatened (IUCN 3.1)

Scientific classification
- Kingdom: Animalia
- Phylum: Chordata
- Class: Aves
- Order: Columbiformes
- Family: Columbidae
- Genus: Treron
- Species: T. chloropterus

Binomial name
- Treron chloropterus Blyth, 1845

= Andaman green pigeon =

Species of bird

The Andaman green pigeon (Treron chloropterus) is a pigeon in the genus Treron. It is found in the Andaman and Nicobar Islands. Many authorities split the species from the pompadour green pigeon complex. It was first added to the IUCN Red List in July 2014.

== Behaviour ==
The Andaman green pigeon usually occurs singly or in small groups. Its flight is fast and direct, with the regular beats and an occasional sharp flick of the wings that are characteristic of pigeons in general. It eats the seeds and fruits of a wide variety of plants. It builds a stick nest in a tree and lays two white eggs.
