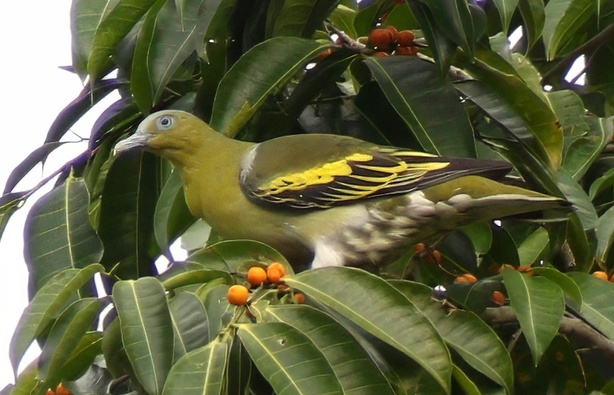

Conservation status
- Near Threatened (IUCN 3.1)

Scientific classification
- Kingdom: Animalia
- Phylum: Chordata
- Class: Aves
- Order: Columbiformes
- Family: Columbidae
- Genus: Treron
- Species: T. aromaticus

Binomial name
- Treron aromaticus (Gmelin, JF, 1789)

= Buru green pigeon =

Species of bird

The Buru green pigeon (Treron aromaticus) is a pigeon in the genus Treron. It is found in the forests of Buru in Indonesia. Many authorities split the species from the pompadour green pigeon complex.

== Taxonomy ==
The Buru green pigeon was formally described in 1789 by the German naturalist Johann Friedrich Gmelin in his revised and expanded edition of Carl Linnaeus's Systema Naturae. He placed it with all the other doves and pigeons in the genus Columba and coined the binomial name Columba aromatica. Gmelin based his own description on "Le Pigeon Vert d'Amboine" that had been described and illustrated by the French ornithologists Mathurin Jacques Brisson and Georges-Louis Leclerc, Comte de Buffon. The Buru green pigeon is now placed in the genus Treron that was introduced in 1816 by the French ornithologist Louis Pierre Vieillot. The genus name is from the Ancient Greek trērōn meaning "pigeon" or "dove". The specific epithet aromaticus is Latin meaning "aromatic" or "fragrant". Amboine (now Ambon) and Buru form part of the Maluku Islands or Moluccas of Indonesia that were known as the Spice Islands. The species is monotypic: no subspecies are recognised.

The Buru green pigeon was formerly consider as conspecific with the Pompadour green pigeon (Treron pompadora).

== Behaviour ==
The Buru green pigeon usually occurs singly or in small groups. Its flight is fast and direct, with the regular beats and an occasional sharp flick of the wings that are characteristic of pigeons in general. It eats the seeds and fruits of a wide variety of plants. It builds a stick nest in a tree and lays two white eggs.
