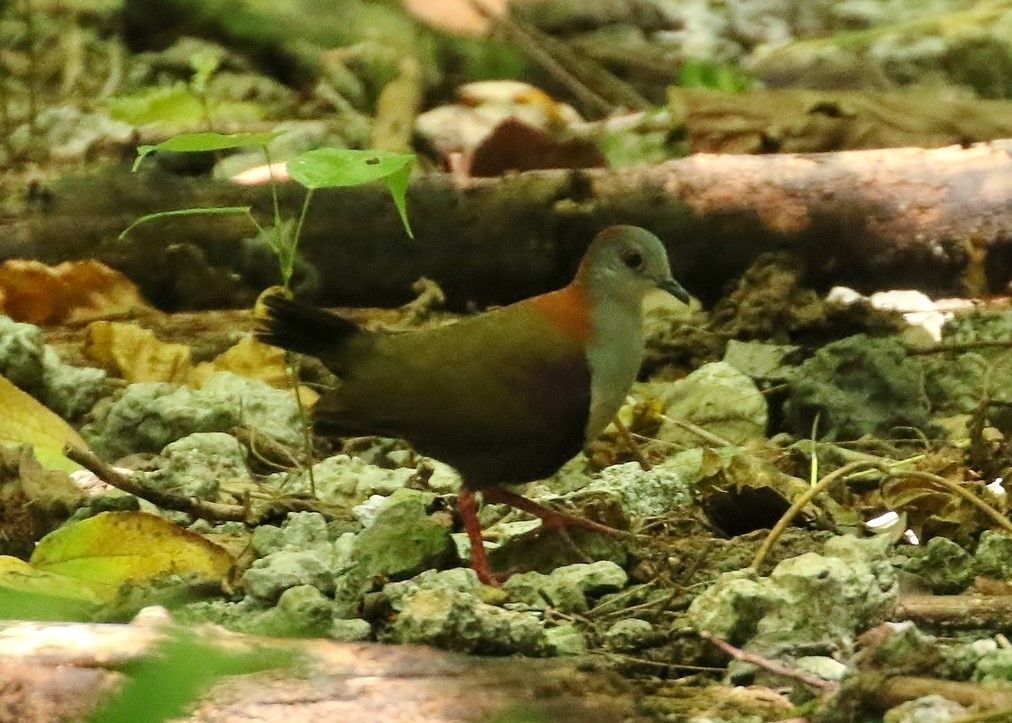

Conservation status
- Endangered (IUCN 3.1)

Scientific classification
- Kingdom: Animalia
- Phylum: Chordata
- Class: Aves
- Order: Columbiformes
- Family: Columbidae
- Genus: Pampusana
- Species: P. canifrons

Binomial name
- Pampusana canifrons (Hartlaub & Finsch, 1872)

Synonyms
- Phlegoenas canifrons Hartlaub & Finsch, 1872; Gallicolumba canifrons; Alopecoenas canifrons

= Palau ground dove =

Species of bird endemic to the island country Palau

The Palau ground dove (Pampusana canifrons) is a species of bird in the family Columbidae. It is endemic to Palau, living in forests. The IUCN has assessed it as an endangered species.

== Taxonomy ==
Hartlaub and Finsch described this species as Phlegoenas canifrons from Palau in 1872. The species is monotypic. Formerly placed in the genus Gallicolumba, it was moved to Alopecoenas. The name of the genus was changed in 2019 to Pampusana Bonaparte, 1855 as this name has priority.

== Description ==
This dove is about 21 cm (8.3 in) long. The forehead and lores are ashy grey, and the crown is dark slaty. The nape and upper mantle are chestnut. The lower mantle is olive and has bronze reflections. The flight feathers are dark brown and rufous, and there is a purple patch on the wing coverts. The throat is pearly grey, and the breast is ashy grey. The abdomen is blackish brown. The upper tail has green and blackish feathers, and the under tail is blackish. The eyes are dark brown, the beak is blackish, and the legs are red. The juvenile bird has a duller forehead and throat, and it does not have the purple patch on the wing coverts.

== Distribution and habitat ==
The Palau ground dove is endemic to Palau. It is one of two species of terrestrial pigeons in Palau, the other being the larger Nicobar pigeon. It lives in dense forest and woodlands, preferring limestone islands to volcanic islands.

== Behaviour ==
This is a solitary species, foraging for seeds and fruits in leaf litter on the ground. It calls from the same place in the mornings and evenings, cooing monotonously for up to two minutes. It also gives a moaning call. Its breeding habits are unknown.

== Status ==
P. canifrons is mostly rare, but it is common on small islands called the Rock Islands. The number of mature individuals is estimated at 600–1700. It is not threatened on some small islands, so the population trend is probably stable. Invasive species such as rats and the brown tree snake may threaten the species. The International Union for Conservation of Nature has assessed its conservation status as endangered because the species is rare and has a small population. It is an endangered species under the Palau Endangered Species Act. A 2005 survey found two birds on Babeldaob and two birds on Peleliu.
