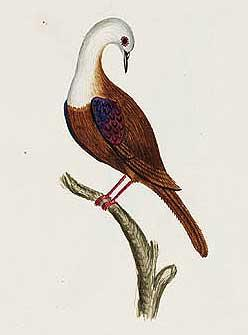

Conservation status
- Extinct (1800) (IUCN 3.1)

Scientific classification
- Kingdom: Animalia
- Phylum: Chordata
- Class: Aves
- Order: Columbiformes
- Family: Columbidae
- Genus: Pampusana
- Species: †P. norfolkensis

Binomial name
- †Pampusana norfolkensis (Forshaw, 2015)

Synonyms
- Alopecoenas norfolkensis Forshaw, 2015

= Norfolk ground dove =

Extinct species of bird

The Norfolk ground dove (Pampusana norfolkensis) is an extinct species of bird in the Columbidae, or pigeon family.

It was endemic to Norfolk Island, but became extinct due to introduced predators, disappearing within a few decades after European settlement in the late 18th century.

There are no preserved specimens of the Norfolk ground dove and the majority of unambiguous information about the species comes from the single illustration made by John Hunter for the book Collection of 100 original watercolours of Birds, Flowers, Fishes and Natives done during 1788–1790 in New South Wales, pl. no 89, with a description "Dove. Norfolk Island". In the past the scientific name Columba norfolciensis Latham (1801) was used to refer to this species; however, the name was also used to refer to the common emerald dove and the white-headed pigeon, and it cannot be confirmed that Latham's original description of Columba norfolciensis refers to the species illustrated by Hunter. The name Columba norfolciensis was suppressed by ICZN in 2010. Joseph Forshaw (2015) introduced a new scientific name for the Norfolk ground dove, Alopecoenas norfolkensis.

The name of the genus was changed in 2019 to Pampusana Bonaparte, 1855 as this name has priority.
