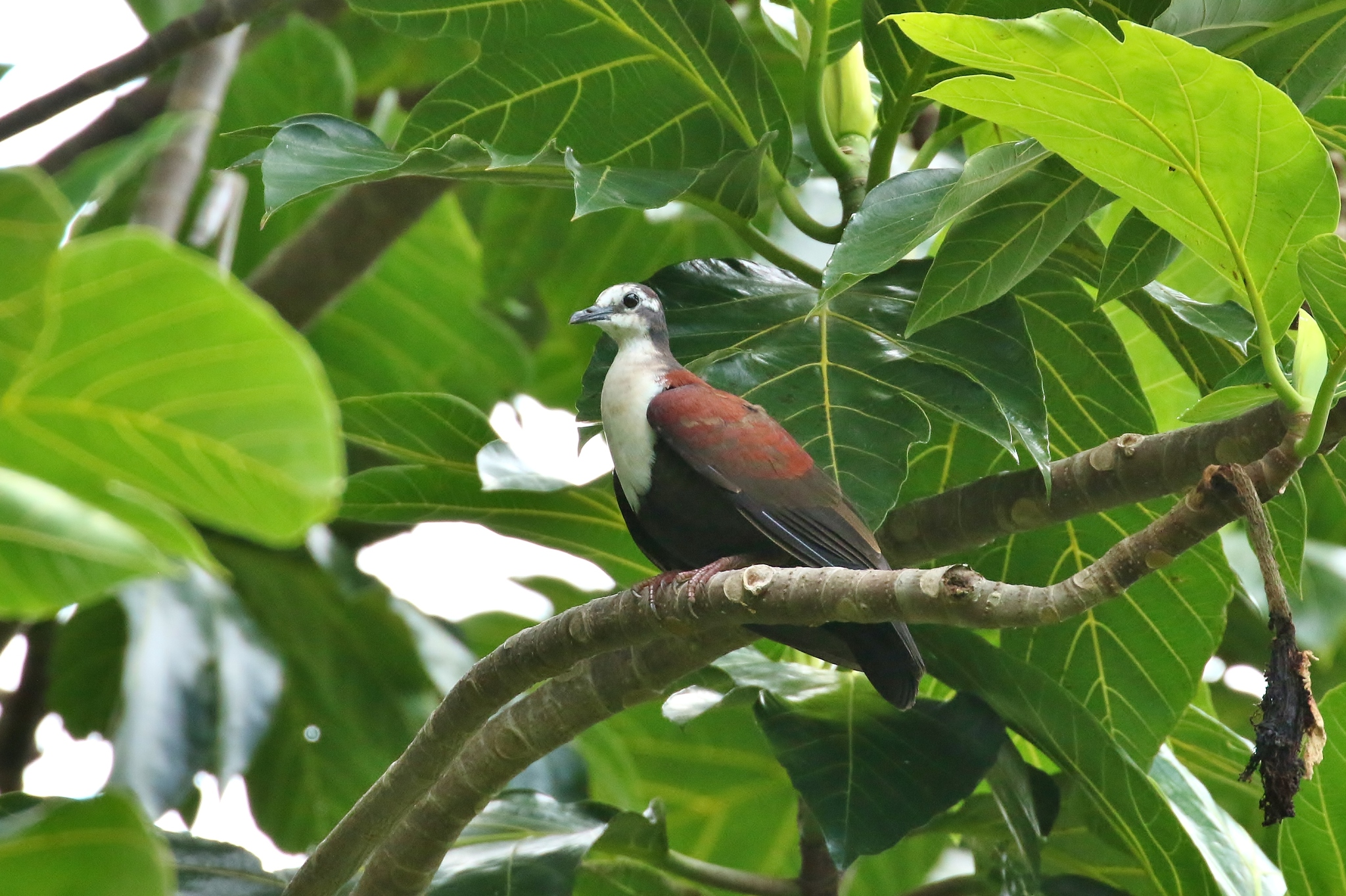

Conservation status
- Endangered (IUCN 3.1)

Scientific classification
- Kingdom: Animalia
- Phylum: Chordata
- Class: Aves
- Order: Columbiformes
- Family: Columbidae
- Genus: Pampusana
- Species: P. kubaryi

Binomial name
- Pampusana kubaryi (Finsch, 1880)

Synonyms
- Phlegoenas kubaryi Finsch, 1880; Gallicolumba kubaryi; Alopecoenas kubaryi

= White-fronted ground dove =

Species of bird

The white-fronted ground dove or Caroline Islands ground dove (Pampusana kubaryi) is a species of bird in the family Columbidae. It is endemic to Micronesia.

Its natural habitats are subtropical or tropical moist lowland forest, subtropical or tropical mangrove forest, subtropical or tropical moist montane forest, subtropical or tropical moist shrubland, and plantations . It is threatened by habitat loss.

This species was formerly in the genus Alopecoenas Sharpe, 1899, but the name of the genus was changed in 2019 to Pampusana Bonaparte, 1855 as this name has priority.
