= Thick-billed ground dove =

Conservation status
- Extinct (2005) (IUCN 3.1)

Scientific classification
- Kingdom: Animalia
- Phylum: Chordata
- Class: Aves
- Order: Columbiformes
- Family: Columbidae
- Genus: Pampusana
- Species: †P. salamonis

Binomial name
- †Pampusana salamonis (Ramsay, 1882)

Synonyms
- Phlogaenas salamonis Ramsay, 1882; Gallicolumba salamonis; Alopecoenas salamonis

Extinct species of bird

The thick-billed ground dove (Pampusana salamonis) is an extinct dove species of the family Columbidae.

== Description ==
This poorly known species is only known from two specimens from 1882 and 1927. The holotype from 1882 can be seen in the Australian Museum in Sydney.

The length was about 26 cm. The head, the throat, and the breast mantle were beige. The chestnut upperparts with a pale purple sheen on the carpals and the small wing coverts contrasted with a chocolate-coloured belly.

The thick-billed ground dove might have preferred dry beach forests on the Solomon Islands of Makira (formerly San Cristobal), and the tiny island of Ramos Island which belongs to Isabel. It is likely that it also occurred on other islands in that region in the past. It was a ground-dweller like its congeners, and consequently was easy prey for introduced rats, feral pigs, cats and dogs. Hunting and the logging of lowland forests in its habitat sealed its fate.

Despite the fact that it was last seen in 1927, the IUCN has long hesitated to declare this species extinct. Many surveys in its former range were undertaken in the later part of the 20th century, but when the last search for this species on Ramos in 2004 had failed also, it was officially declared extinct in 2005. It probably became extinct in the mid-20th century following the increased activity around the time of World War II, which affected several populations of endemic birds in the region. Further surveys of birds on Makira in 2015-2016 did not produce evidence of the thick-billed ground dove.

This species was formerly in the genus Alopecoenas Sharpe, 1899, but the name of the genus was changed in 2019 to Pampusana Bonaparte, 1855 as this name has priority.
