= Santa Cruz ground dove =

Conservation status
- Endangered (IUCN 3.1)

Scientific classification
- Kingdom: Animalia
- Phylum: Chordata
- Class: Aves
- Order: Columbiformes
- Family: Columbidae
- Genus: Pampusana
- Species: P. sanctaecrucis

Binomial name
- Pampusana sanctaecrucis (Mayr, 1935)

Synonyms
- Gallicolumba sanctaecrucis Mayr, 1935; Alopecoenas sanctaecrucis

Species of bird

The Santa Cruz ground dove (Pampusana sanctaecrucis) is a species of bird in the family Columbidae. It is found in the southern Solomon Islands and Vanuatu. Its natural habitat is subtropical or tropical moist lowland forests. It is threatened by habitat loss.

This species was formerly in the genus Alopecoenas Sharpe, 1899, but the name of the genus was changed in 2019 to Pampusana Bonaparte, 1855 as this name has priority.
