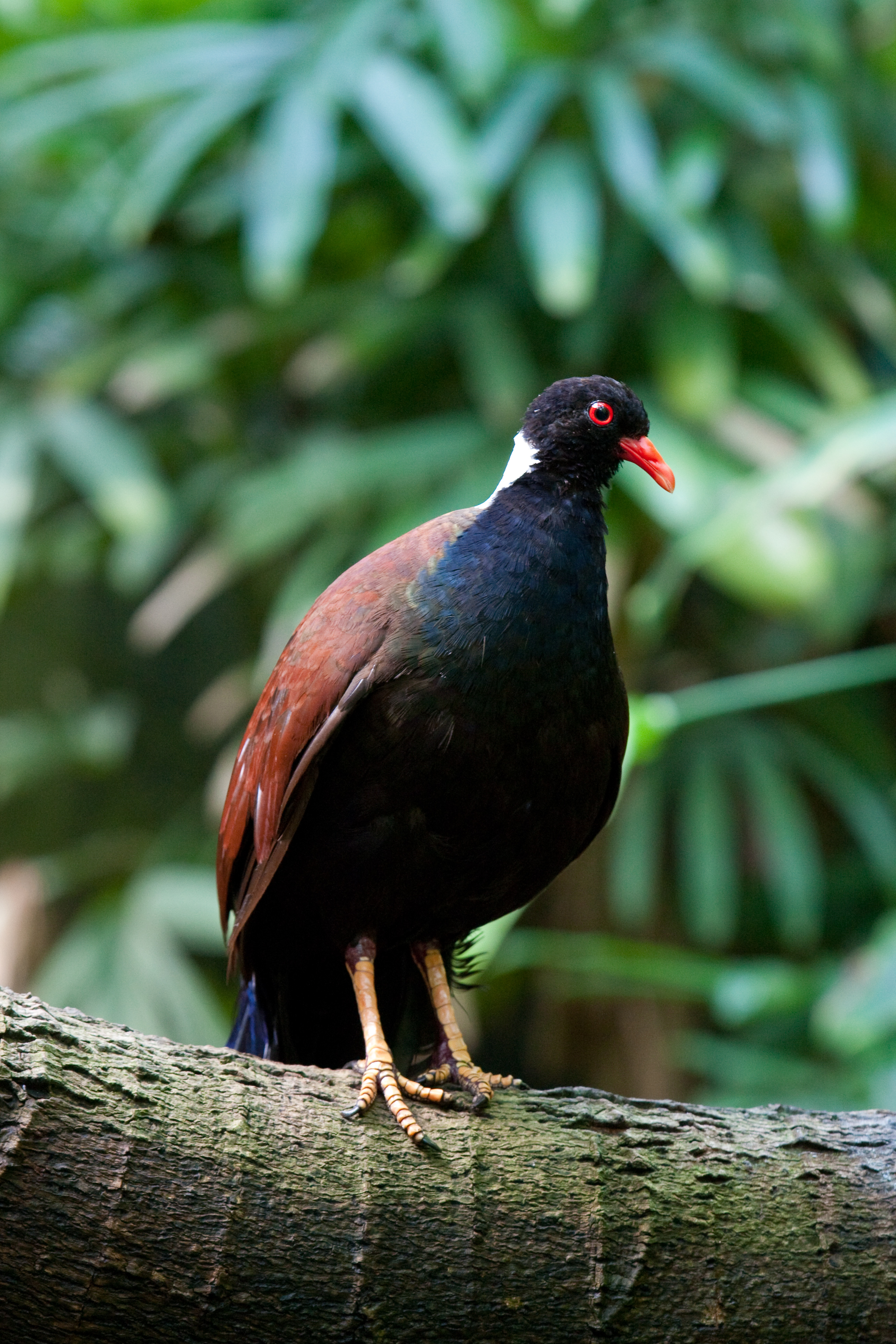
- White-naped pheasant pigeon

Conservation status
- Least Concern (IUCN 3.1)

Scientific classification
- Kingdom: Animalia
- Phylum: Chordata
- Class: Aves
- Order: Columbiformes
- Family: Columbidae
- Tribe: Raphini
- Genus: Otidiphaps; Gould, 1870
- Species: O. nobilis

Binomial name
- Otidiphaps nobilis Gould, 1870

= Pheasant pigeon =

Species of bird

The pheasant pigeon (Otidiphaps nobilis) is a species of large terrestrial pigeon. It is the only species of the monotypic genus Otidiphaps. The pheasant pigeon is found in the primary rainforests of New Guinea and nearby islands. It ranges primarily over hilly and lower mountain areas, but can also be found in lowlands.

== Taxonomy and systematics ==
The genus name makes reference to its similarities to the bustard family (Otidae). Its common name reflects its adaptation to living on the forest floor in the fashion of a South East Asian pheasant.

=== Subspecies ===
Commonly, there are four subspecies recognized that differ primarily in the presence or absence of a small crest and in the colour of the nape:

- White-naped pheasant pigeon (O. n. aruensis) – Rothschild, 1928: Found on the Aru Islands, Vulnerable
- Green-naped pheasant pigeon (O. n. nobilis) – Gould, 1870: Found on western New Guinea, Batanta and Waigeo Islands, Least concern.
- Grey-naped pheasant pigeon (O. n. cervicalis) – Ramsay, EP, 1880: Found on eastern and south-eastern New Guinea, Least concern.
- Black-naped pheasant pigeon (O. n. insularis) – Salvin & Godman, 1883: Found on Fergusson Island, Critically Endangered.

Some authors, however, recognize the four subspecies as four different species, a classification scheme followed by the IUCN.

== Description ==
The pheasant pigeon resembles a pheasant in external morphology, particularly in its laterally compressed tail and rounded wings. They have glossy black heads, undersides, rears and lower backs, and short rounded brown wings, and a white, green, grey, or black nape depending on the subspecies.

The pheasant pigeon has filled the ecological niche of a partridge or small pheasant (while the larger Goura crowned pigeons have a lifestyle similar to larger pheasants, grouse or turkeys). It is a highly secretive species, feeding on seeds and fallen fruits. It inhabits hill and montane areas, however, it is also known to inhabit lower altitudes. It nests on the ground below trees and bushes, laying one egg that it incubates for around four weeks. Both adults incubate and look after the young, feeding regurgitated crop milk to their young (a common practice for most pigeons).

They have a range of calls including a drilling-like sound, a typical pigeon cooing call and a loud "wu-huwoooooa" call that rises and falls in pitch before trailing off at the end.

They are found in rainforest habitats, eating fallen fruits and seeds, in the Aru Islands. As they avoid human settlements, the little that is known about their behavior comes from observation at zoos.

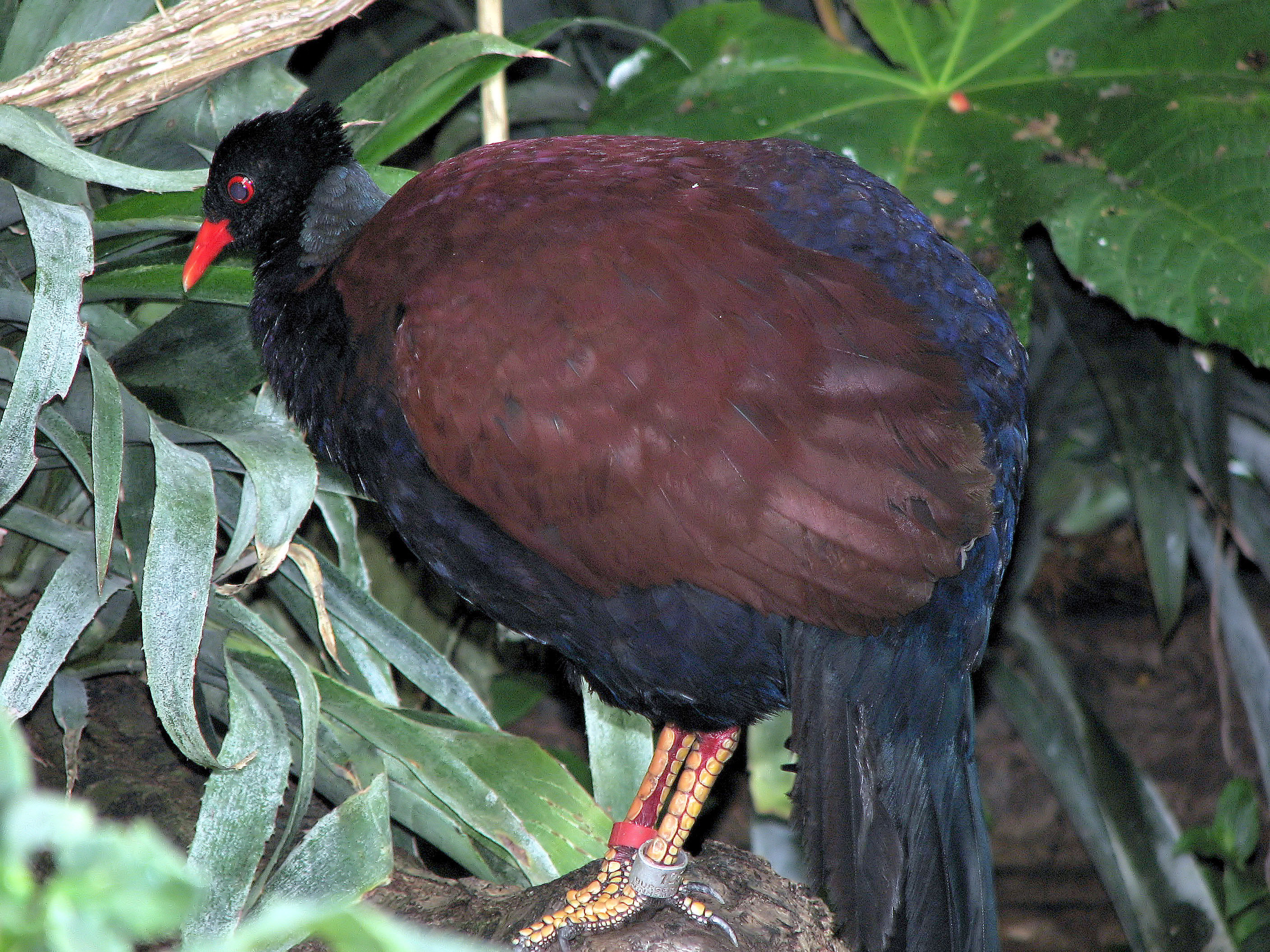
O. n. nobilis

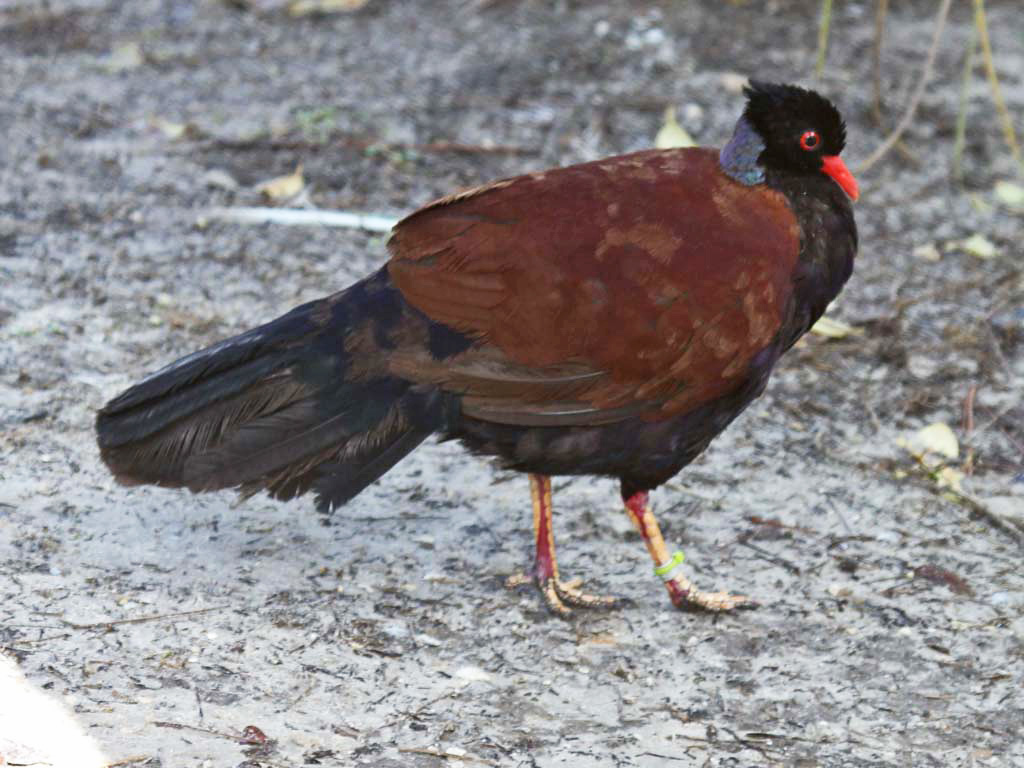
O. n. nobilis in a zoo

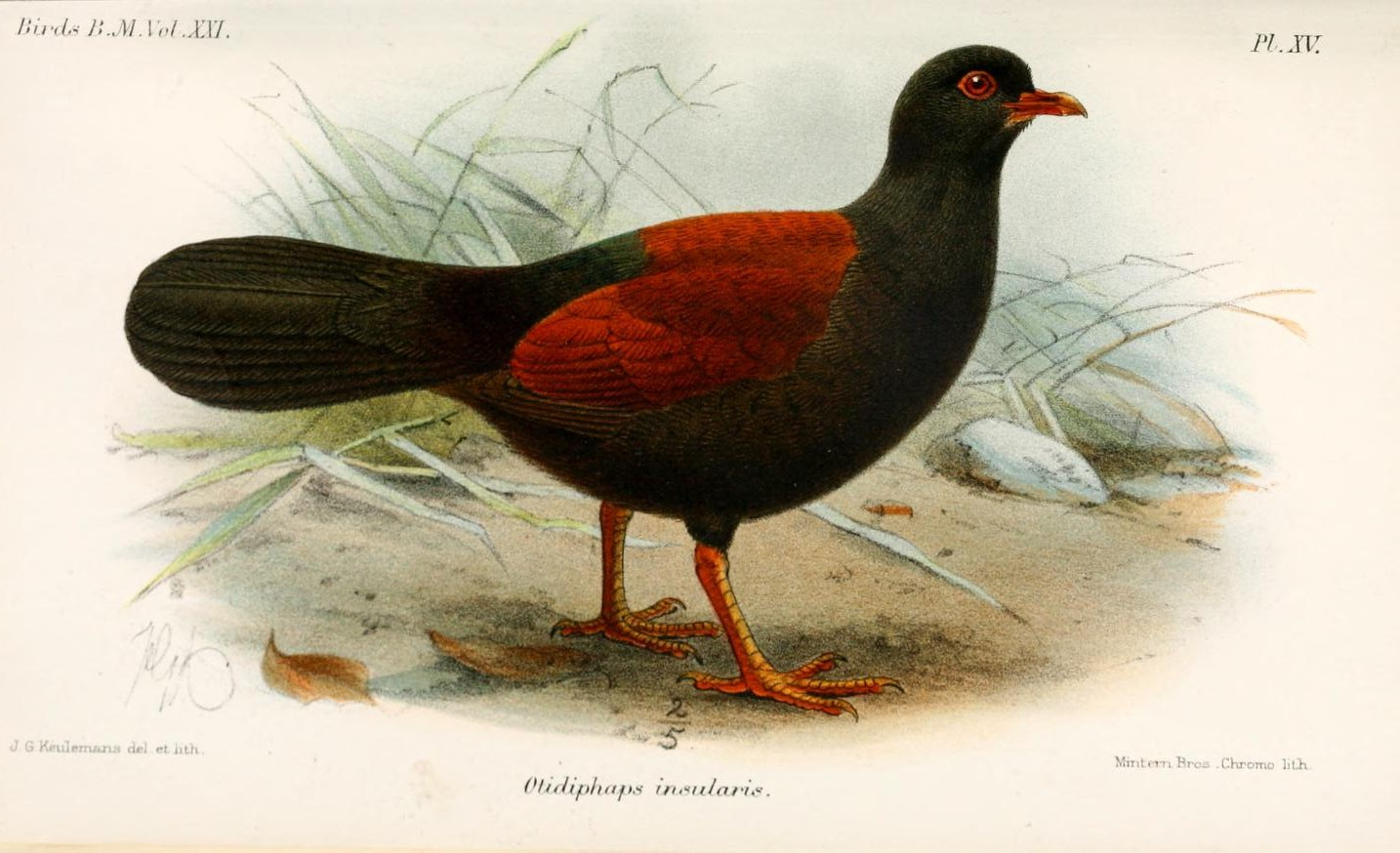
O. n. insularis

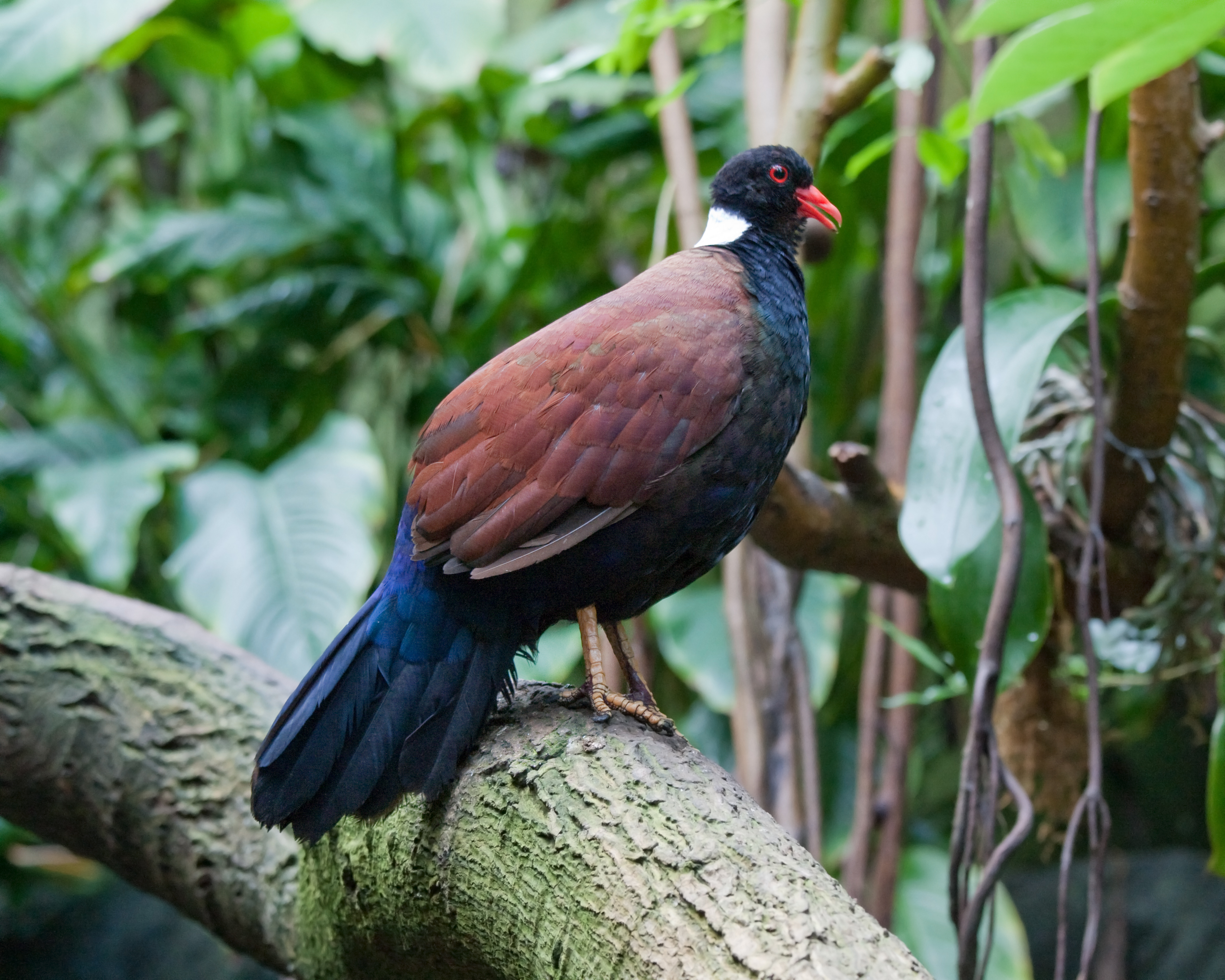
Captive O. n. aruensis (vulnerable)

== Status and conservation ==
The species is believed to be slowly declining due to deforestation of their habitats from pressure for logging and agricultural space. Because it is tied to primary forests, and is unique within the pigeon family, it is considered a genus that requires further investigation and monitoring. The green-naped pheasant pigeon (nominate subspecies) and the grey-naped pheasant pigeon are not considered threatened, but the black-naped pheasant pigeon is considered critically endangered and the white-naped pheasant pigeon is vulnerable.

The black-naped pheasant pigeon was for a long time known to science only from the two type specimens collected in 1882 and the third specimen collected in 1896, and for the ensuing 126 years thought to be extinct, but was then captured with a trail camera from the Fergusson Island in September 2022 by Jordan Boersma and colleagues, who later officially published their findings in an academic journal in March 2025.
