= Sulu bleeding-heart =

Conservation status
- Critically Endangered (IUCN 3.1)

Scientific classification
- Kingdom: Animalia
- Phylum: Chordata
- Class: Aves
- Order: Columbiformes
- Family: Columbidae
- Genus: Gallicolumba
- Species: G. menagei

Binomial name
- Gallicolumba menagei (Bourns & Worcester, 1894)
- Map of the Philippines highlighting Tawi-Tawi

Synonyms
- Phlogoenas menagei Bourns & Worcester, 1894

Species of bird

The Sulu bleeding-heart or Tawitawi bleeding-heart (Gallicolumba menagei) is a species of bird in the pigeon and dove family, Columbidae. It is endemic to the island of Tawi-Tawi and its surrounding islets in the Philippines' Sulu Archipelago. This species is known only from two specimens collected in 1891, and has not been recorded with certainty since. It lives in primary and secondary forests that have a closed canopy. The Sulu bleeding-heart is a medium-sized pigeon with a short tail. Bright metallic green feathers stretch from the forehead and crown down to the mantle and sides of the breast, where they surround a large, pale orange breast spot with diffuse edges that gives the species the name "bleeding-heart". The lower wings and back are varying shades of brown, and the throat and chest are largely white. The belly is an ashy-gray.

Like other bleeding-hearts, the Sulu bleeding-heart is primarily a sedentary bird, feeding on the forest floor and flying only for short distances. Little is known about its behavior due to the paucity of sightings. Searches of Tawi-Tawi in 1971 and 1991 did not discover any evidence of the species' continued existence. Most of the bird's habitat was logged on Tawi-Tawi by 1994. However, an ethnobiological survey in 1995 revealed that the bleeding-heart was common until the 1970s and still survives on small islets near Tawi-Tawi. While another survey in 2009 failed to find the species, there is some hope that it may still persist. For this reason, it is currently listed as critically endangered by the IUCN. Any surviving population would be very small, likely numbering fewer than 50 individuals, and would be threatened by habitat destruction and uncontrolled hunting.

== Taxonomy ==
The Sulu bleeding-heart was originally described in 1894 as Phlogoenas menagei by Frank Swift Bourns and Dean Conant Worcester. The holotype, a male, was collected by them from the small island of Tataan off the coast of Tawi-Tawi in October 1891. The specific name, menagei, honors Louis F. Menage, a Minnesota real estate tycoon who funded the expedition. It is a member of the bleeding-heart superspecies, which includes Luzon bleeding-heart, Mindanao bleeding-heart, Mindoro bleeding-heart, and Negros bleeding-heart; these birds are so similar that some authors have considered them to be a single species. Some authors place the Sulu bleeding-heart, the other bleeding-hearts, and the cinnamon ground dove in their own subgenus, Gallicolumba. The Sulu bleeding-heart has no known subspecies. It is also called the Tawitawi bleeding-heart and the Tawitawi Puñalada.

== Description ==
The Sulu bleeding-heart is a medium-sized pigeon with a short tail. Bright metallic green feathers stretch from the forehead and crown down to the mantle and sides of the breast. The scapular feathers are a dark chestnut color and are fringed with iridescence that can appear violet, green, or lilac in different lights. The wing-coverts are also a dark brown, with some of the feathers being ashy-gray at the tip to form a slight wingbar. The primary and greater coverts as well as the secondaries are a fulvous-brown edged in rufous, while the primaries are a dark brown with the longest feathers being tipped in black. The bleeding-heart's underwings are chestnut. The back down to the upper portion of the tail is a ruddy-brown narrowly fringed with metallic green or violet. The center of the tail is dark brown while the edges are ashy-gray and tipped with a broad black band; the undertail-coverts are orange while the undertail is ashy-gray. The area around the bird's eyes is black with a faint hint of glossy green, and the chin, throat, and breast are pure white. The upper breast is framed by large patches of metallic green feathers of the same coloration as the mantle that form an incomplete breast band in the center of the chest. In between these patches is a large, pale orange breast spot with diffuse edges. The belly is ashy-gray. Males and females are similar in appearance, and the plumage of the juvenile is unknown. The iris is a light silver-gray. The bill is black with a gray tip, and the feet are red. The bleeding-heart is between 25 and 27 cm (9.8 and 10.6 in) long, and the weight is unknown.

The Sulu bleeding-heart is easily distinguished from most terrestrial doves found on Tawi-Tawi. The emerald dove is most likely to be confused with the bleeding-heart, but the emerald dove is distinguished by a larger and whiter shoulder patch, a white supercilium, and dark chestnut underparts. Two bleeding-hearts are kept as pets and may escape on Tawi-Tawi; the Sulu bleeding-heart differs from the Luzon bleeding-heart by not having the Luzon bleeding-heart's purple nape and back, and from the Mindanao bleeding-heart by lacking prominent gray wing-bars and an orange belly.

The Sulu bleeding-heart's vocalizations have never been described.

== Distribution and habitat ==
The Sulu bleeding-heart is endemic to the island of Tawi-Tawi and its nearby islets in the southwestern part of the Philippines's Sulu Archipelago. The bleeding-heart is believed to be extirpated on the Tawi-Tawi mainland, but there are indigenous reports of the species on the nearby islets of Tandubatu, Dundangan, and Baliungan. There is also an unconfirmed nineteenth-century sight record of the species from the island of Jolo in the center of the Sulu Archipelago.

The species lives in primary and secondary forests that have a closed canopy. On the smaller islets, it lives in beach forest.

== Ecology and behavior ==
Like other bleeding-hearts, the Sulu bleeding-heart is primarily a sedentary bird, feeding on the forest floor and flying only for short distances. It only perches in trees in order to roost or mate. When alarmed, bleeding-hearts run quickly into nearby undergrowth. It is very elusive in its forested habitat, and nothing else is known about its behavior.

== Status ==
The Sulu bleeding-heart is considered to be critically endangered by the IUCN. The Sulu bleeding-heart has always been considered a rare bird, and only two specimens, both males, have ever been taken of the species. The specimens, collected in October 1891 on the small islet of Tataan, are the last time anyone has definitely seen the Sulu bleeding-heart alive. The bleeding-heart was searched for 22 days in December 1971 and briefly in September 1991 without success. Most of Tawi-Tawi's forests were cleared by August 1994, and the Sulu bleeding-heart may well be extirpated on the mainland. However, an ethnobiological survey in 1995 generated reports that the bleeding-heart survives and is regularly seen on the nearby islets of Tandubatu, Dundangan, and Baliungan. It was also reported that the species was quite common until the 1970s. Despite this, an expedition in 2009 failed to find any signs of the species or discover a new report of the species' continued existence. The islets it reportedly survives on may also be too small to support a viable population. Any surviving population of Sulu bleeding-hearts is likely to be small, possibly numbering fewer than 50 birds, and would be threatened by continued habitat destruction and uncontrolled hunting. As the Mindanao and Luzon bleeding-hearts are popular cagebirds, any bleeding-heart found on Tawi-Tawi could also be an escaped bleeding-heart instead of the indigenous Sulu bleeding-heart. There are no protected areas in the Sulu Archipelago, and other than two environmental education initiatives in the 1990s nothing has been done to protect any surviving population. The Zoological Society of London has listed the bird as an EDGE species.
