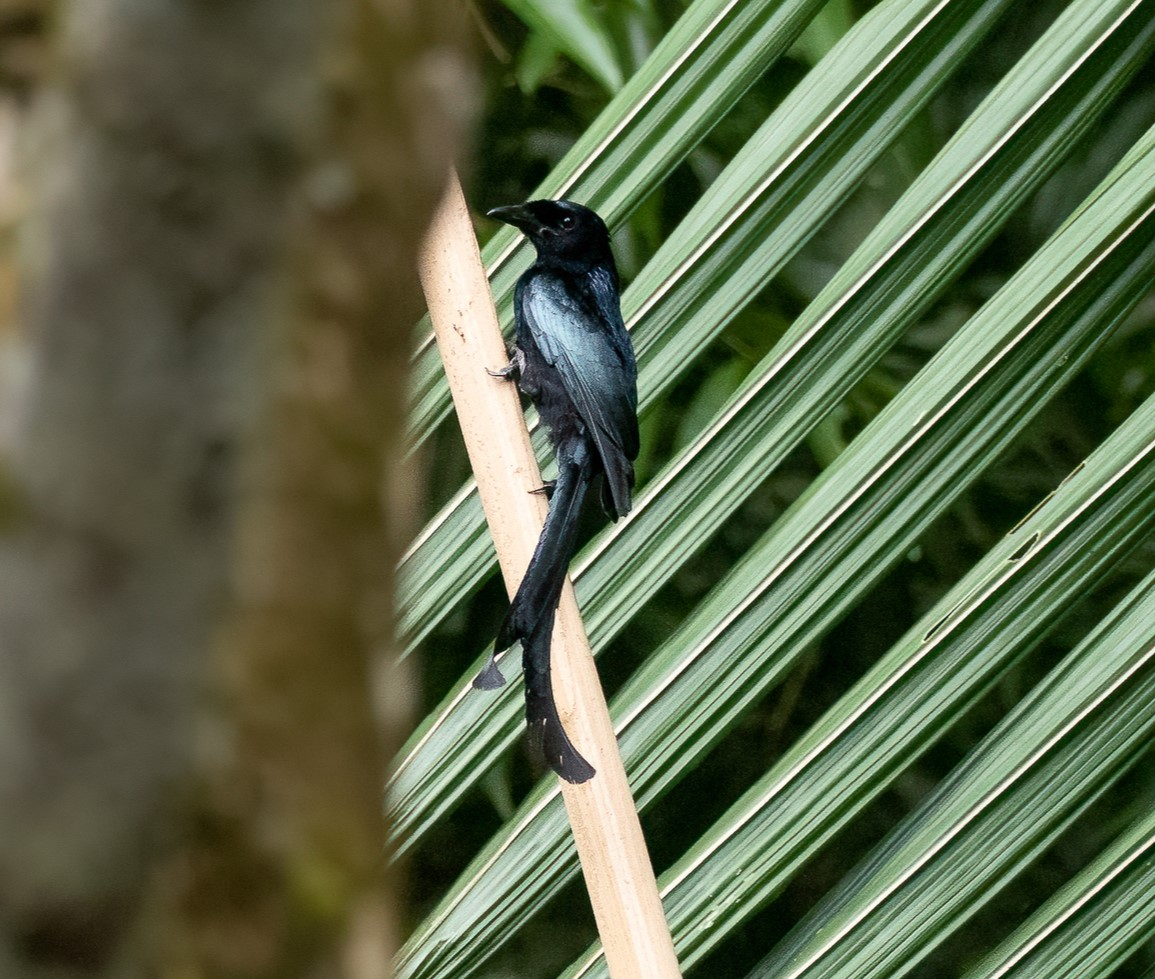

Conservation status
- Endangered (IUCN 3.1)

Scientific classification
- Kingdom: Animalia
- Phylum: Chordata
- Class: Aves
- Order: Passeriformes
- Family: Dicruridae
- Genus: Dicrurus
- Species: D. menagei

Binomial name
- Dicrurus menagei (Bourns & Worcester, 1894)

= Tablas drongo =

Species of bird

The Tablas drongo (Dicrurus menagei) is an Asian bird of the family Dicruridae. It was formerly considered conspecific with the hair-crested drongo.

It is endemic to Tablas Island in the Philippines. It is noted by its jet black plumage with a long fish-like tail. It inhabits tropical old-growth forest. Prior to 1998, it was not seen for many decades due to lack of surveys on the island. It is estimated to consist of just 50 to 250 mature adults making it one of the most endangered birds in the Philippines. It is threatened by habitat loss.

== Description and taxonomy ==
It is a medium sized bird found in the forests of Tablas Island. It is all black with glossy wings, crown and striations on neck and chest. Has a very long fork shaped tail.

Relative to other drongos, it is not as vocal with its call described as quick rasping cicada like call.

The specific name, menagei, commemorates Louis F. Menage, an American real estate tycoon.

== Ecology and behavior ==
This species is insectivorous. It is known to hawk insects in the air but also gleans leaves and trunks. Observed to strip dead leafs of insects with its bill. Nest is a small cup made of thin twigs and fibres. Observed nesting in April but not much else is known about its breeding.

== Habitat and conservation status ==
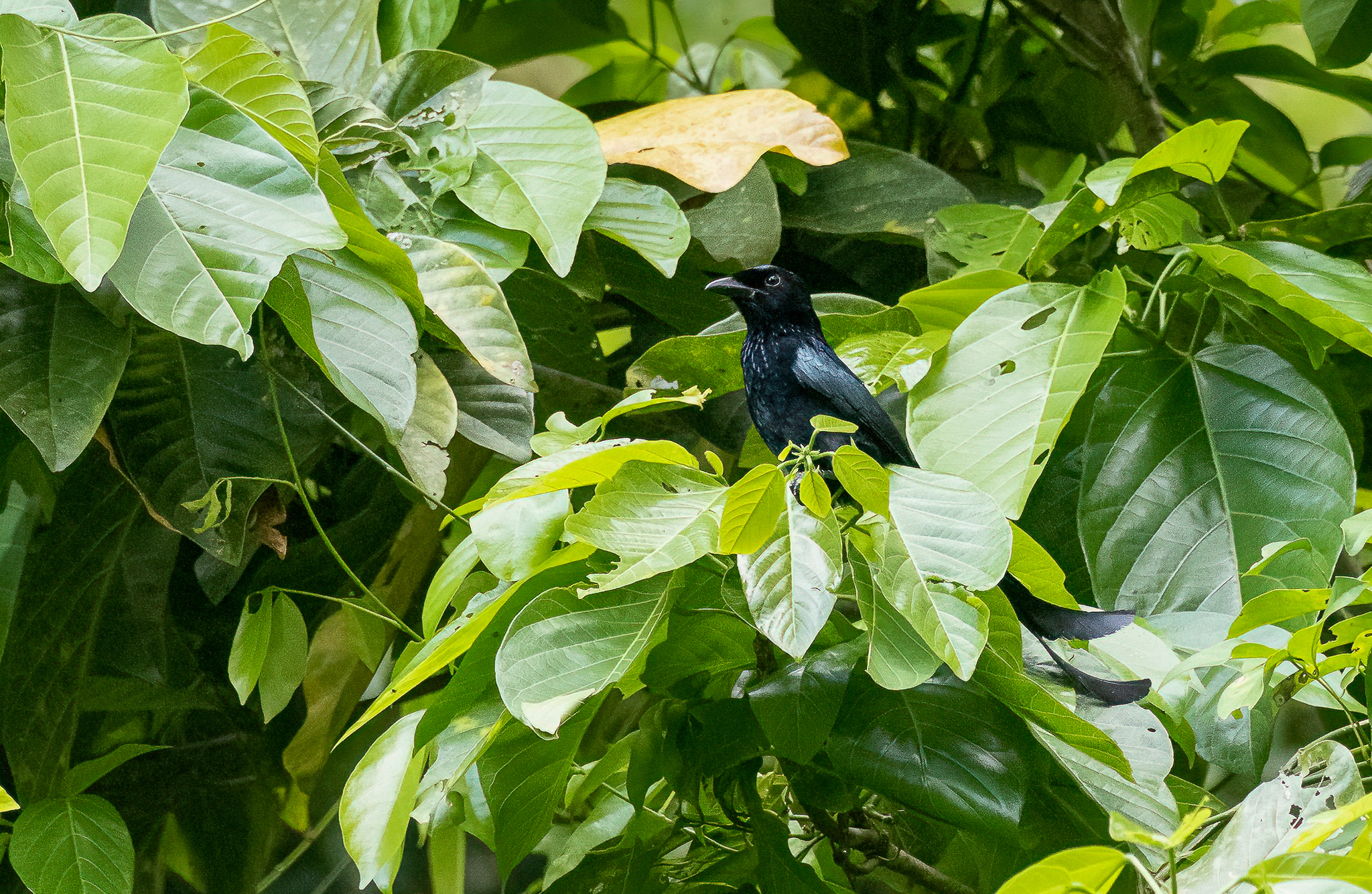
A Tablas drongo in Dubduban Watershed on Tablas Island

The species inhabits tropical moist lowland primary forest in areas with mature closed-canopy forest. Occasional sightings from the edge of clearings but is not found in fully cleared areas. Observed in the mid-canopy of tall trees, often near streams.

The IUCN Red List classifies this bird as an endangered species with population estimates of 50 to 250 mature individuals. This species' main threat is habitat loss with wholesale clearance of forest habitats as a result of legal and illegal logging, and conversion into farmlands through Slash-and-burn and other methods.The species does not occur at high density even within the little remaining forest cover on Tablas:

Mt Palaupau serves as a watershed for Tablas Island.

There are no species specific conservation programs going on at the moment but conservation actions proposed include more species surveys to better understand habitat and population. initiate education and awareness campaigns to raise the species's profile and instill pride in locals. Lobby for protection of remaining forest and assess feasibility of reforestation projects,
