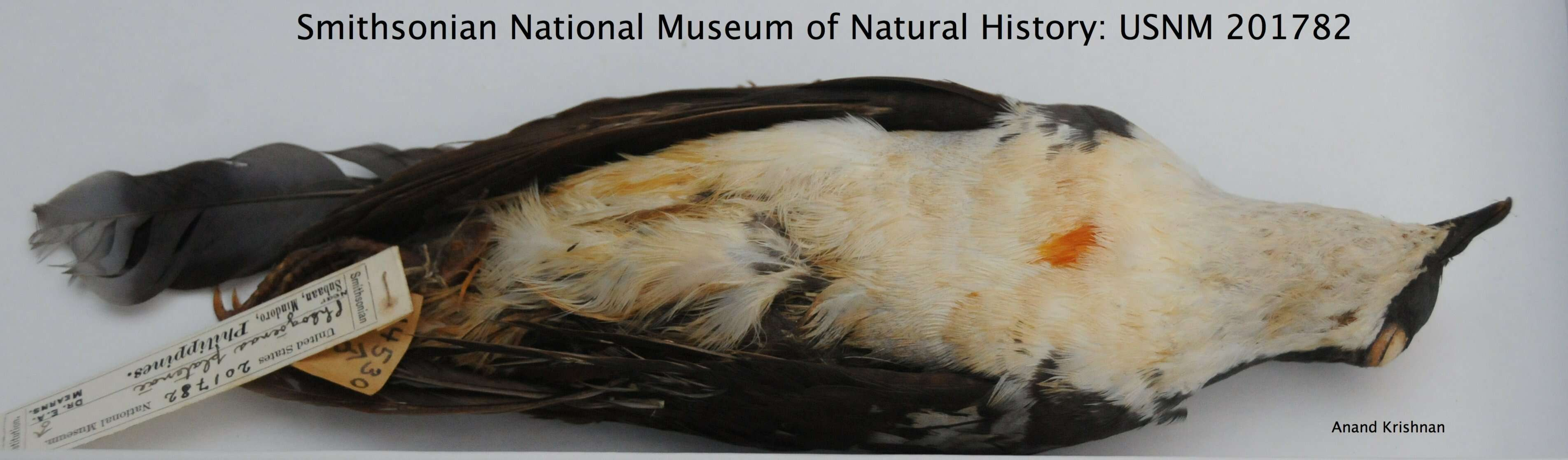
- A Mindoro bleeding-heart study skin in the Smithsonian collection

Conservation status
- Critically Endangered (IUCN 3.1)

Scientific classification
- Kingdom: Animalia
- Phylum: Chordata
- Class: Aves
- Order: Columbiformes
- Family: Columbidae
- Genus: Gallicolumba
- Species: G. platenae

Binomial name
- Gallicolumba platenae (Salvadori, 1893)
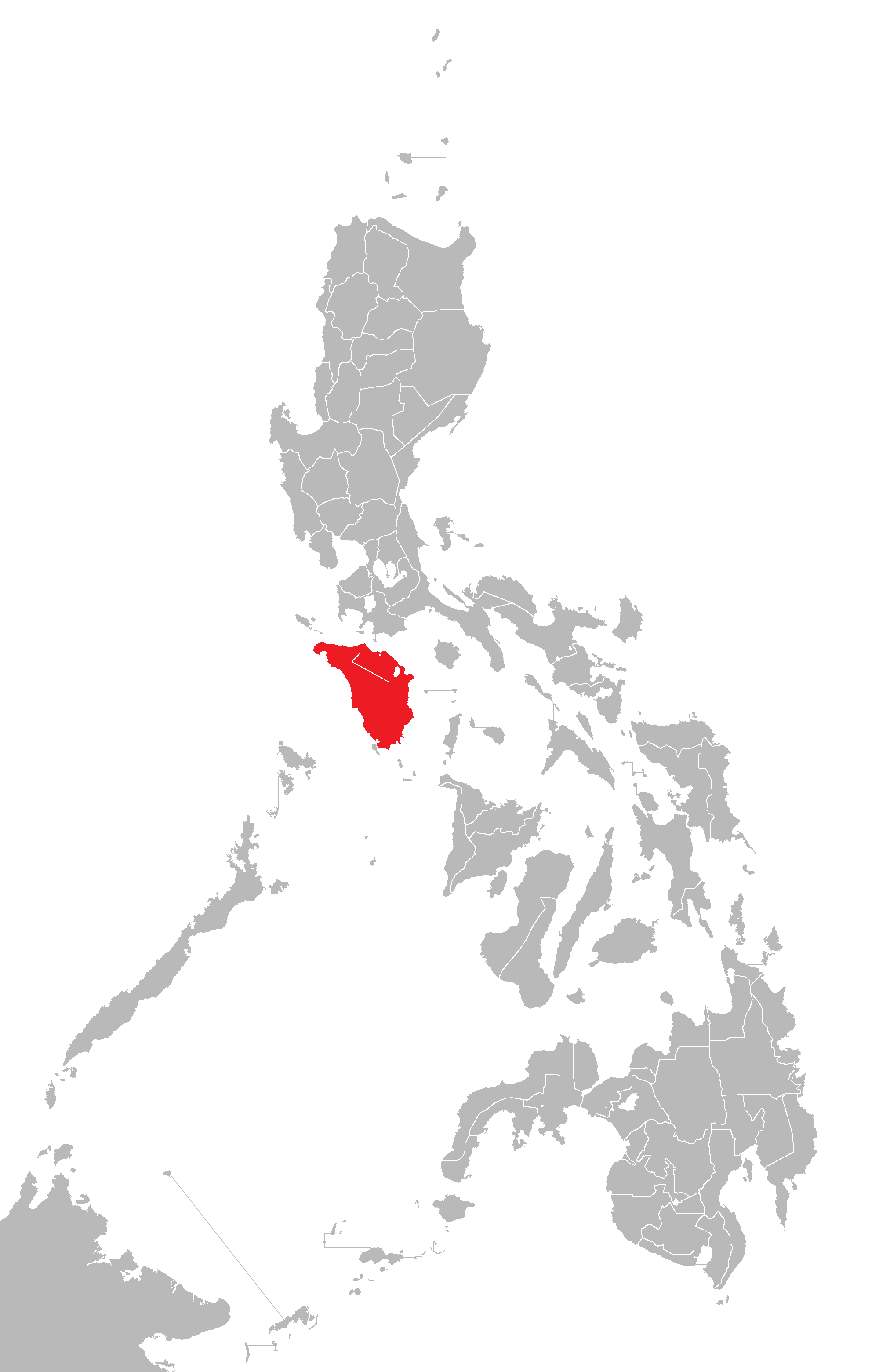

= Mindoro bleeding-heart =

Species of bird

The Mindoro bleeding-heart (Gallicolumba platenae), also referred to as kulo-kulo, la-do, manatad, manuk-manuk, punay, and puñalada by the Mangyan, is a species of ground dove native solely to the island of Mindoro in the Philippines. It is critically endangered and threatened by habitat loss through quarrying, land conversion and illegal logging. This species is also caught by hunters in snares. Due to its biological line and its survival status, it has been listed as an EDGE species by the Zoological Society of London.

This bird was not photographed for 21 years from 2005 until August 2026 where a lone individual was photographed on a camera trap in Northern Mindoro.

== Taxonomy and systematics ==
This species is closely related to four other bleeding-heart dove species: G. luzonica, G. crinigera, G. keayi and G. menagei. These five species, along with G. rufigula, are grouped together into the genus Gallicolumba. A phylogenetic study in 2013 found strong evidence suggesting that the Philippine bleeding-hearts are monophyletic, or that they belong to the same taxonomic clade tied by a common ancestor.

The Mindoro bleeding-heart is monotypic, meaning it does not contain any smaller subspecies groups.

Its taxonomic standing, which dates back to Salvadori in 1893, is deemed valid by the Integrated Taxonomic Information System.

== Description ==
This ground pigeon has been recorded to be around 26 to 30 cm (10 to 12 in) tall. It has a dark grey forehead which transitions into an iridescent green on its head, nape, and hindneck. Its underside–from its throat to its flanks–is a cream-white except for the distinctive patch on the center of its breast which resembles a bright bleeding wound. The chest marking is less prominent and more orange in hue than that of related bleeding-heart doves. The dove's backside contains a reddish purple on its mantle, as well as chestnut coloration on its wings and rump. Its tail and uppertail-coverts are grey. Flecks of white triangles rest on its shoulders.

Its juvenile plumage is unknown.

Like other pigeons, Mindoro bleeding-hearts do not exhibit much sexual dimorphism. Females look similar to males but have purple irises and are generally smaller, with a 141–154 mm (5.6–6.1 in) wingspan (compared to 150–154 mm (5.9–6.1 in) in males).

== Distribution and habitat ==
The Mindoro bleeding-heart dove is endemic to the island of Mindoro in the Philippines. It typically dwells in lowlands at an altitude of 400 m (1,310 ft), but has been noted at 750–800 m (2,460–2,620 ft). It has only been observed in four regions of the island since 1980, as deforestation has dwindled its preferred habitat of closed-canopy primary forest. These regions are Puerto Galera, MUFRC Experimental Forest, Siburan, and Mounts Iglit–Baco Natural Park, but scientists believe other populations may be scattered in other localities including a non-confirmed sighting in Mount Calavite in 2013. This bird favors dry forest floors overrun with bamboos and rattans, occasionally dotted with limestone outcrops and boulders. It has also been observed near pools of dry riverbeds that exist on more leveled forest floors without as many rocks.

This dove is thought to be sedentary instead of migratory, but it is uncertain if it engages in altitudinal, seasonal or nomadic movements. It runs from danger and only flees from predators via brief flight when absolutely necessary.

== Behavior and ecology ==
=== Vocalizations ===
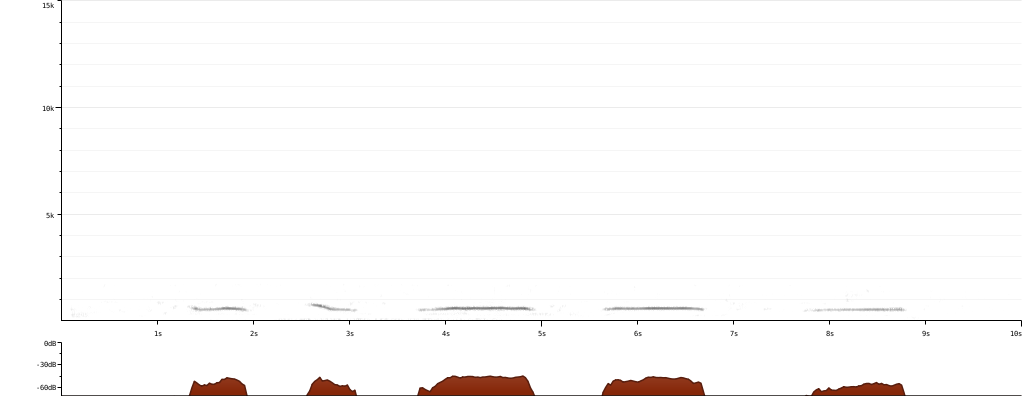
A sonogram of the call of the Mindoro bleeding-heart recorded by Albert Lastukhin

Few recordings of the Mindoro bleeding-heart's song exist, and some of those that do are not made publicly available because they threaten to exacerbate issues of trapping and endangerment. However, its call is believed to resemble a "croo croo" not unlike that of the Negros bleeding-heart.

=== Breeding ===
It has been recorded breeding from February to May. Nests containing two cream-colored eggs have been found in late April and late June; the nests are made of sticks, leaves, and thin rootlets resting on horizontal branches of shrubs or trees 1.5–2 m (4 ft 11 in – 6 ft 7 in) off the ground. According to one account, a female was seen feigning injury so as to distract from the nest she was incubating.

=== Food and feeding ===
The dietary habits of the Mindoro bleeding-heart are not well-documented, but they are assumed to be similar to those of G. luzonica. It has been sighted feeding on fruiting figs alongside the genus Treron, or green pigeons.

=== Threats and Survival ===
The IUCN Red List classifies it as Critically Endangered with an estimate of just 50–249 mature individuals and a declining population. The species' estimated extent of occurrence is 6,800 km^{2} (2,600 sq mi). There are no individuals in captivity.

Its main threats are habitat loss and trapping. Extreme loss of forest has been caused by illegal logging, dynamite-blasting for marble, and slash-and-burn (also known as kaingin). In 1988, just 120 km^{2} (46 sq mi) of forest remained on Mindoro, only 25% of which was closed-canopy. Snares intended mainly for other animals such as Red junglefowl and other small mammals accidentally catch bleeding-hearts.

== Conservation status ==
A conservation study in 1991 found that the island of Mindoro is particularly susceptible to endemism, as it has the least forest cover of any Philippine island after the Sulu Islands. There are six bird species endemic to the island which can be categorized as montane and lowland; the Mindoro bleeding-heart is a lowland species which has been hunted with snares to meet demands for meat and pet trade.

Conservation actions proposed include to map the remaining forests on Mindoro, and survey these areas to clarify its current distribution and population status. It has also been recommended follow up on anecdotal reports of the species, establish captive breeding populations, conduct ecological studies to assess its requirements for breeding and foraging, and regulate hunting of wildlife species and the extraction of forest products within key habitats.

Various NGOs have been working to protect the Mindoro bleeding-heart and the other species in its genus. The Haribon Foundation supposedly has invested over 15 years in a project that seeks to integrate local communities via education and development; the organization has simultaneously teamed up with the Department of the Environment and Natural Resources (DENR) and local government initiatives to push for legislation that forbids deforestation. One method being used is "rainforestation", or the planting of native tree species which are easy to germinate, in contrast with typical reforestation efforts that introduce exotic species.

In 2026, the nonprofit organization Center for Conservation Innovation Ph Inc. (CCIPH). documented a Mindoro Bleeding-heart in Puerto Galera through a camera trap. This marked the first confirmed sighting of this species since its last photograph in 2005. This record is especially interesting as it was found at 900 meters above sea level, above its expected altitudinal range. However, researchers caution that this may be a sign that this species has lost all lowland habitat that birds have been pushed upward.
