= Metropolitan Building (Minneapolis) =

Structure in Minnesota, US

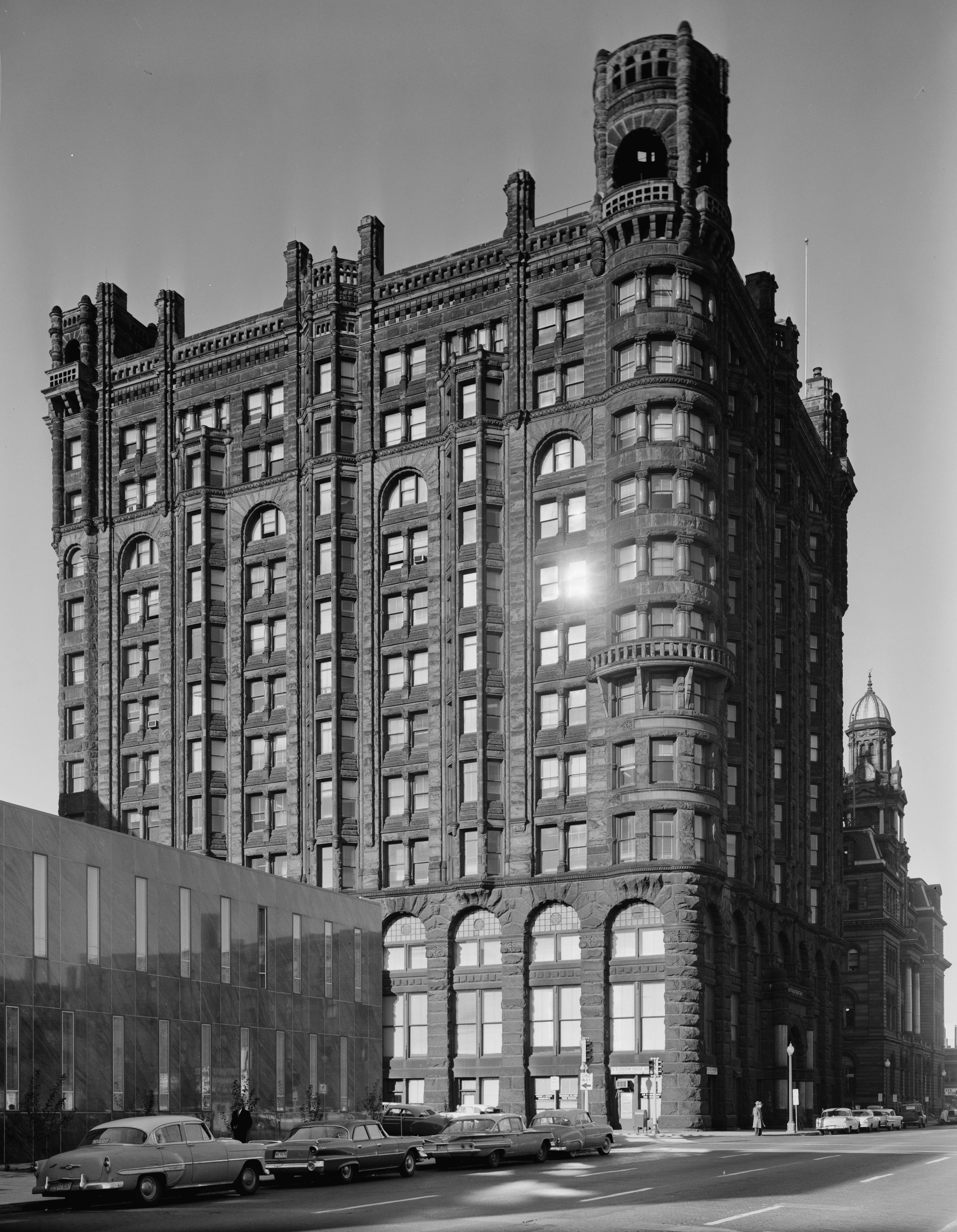
- The Metropolitan Building in November 1960
- Interactive map of the Metropolitan Building area
- Alternative names: Northwestern Guaranty Loan Building

General information
- Status: Demolished
- Location: 308 2nd Avenue South, Minneapolis, Minnesota
- Coordinates: 44°58′46.3″N 93°16′0″W
- Completed: 1890
- Destroyed: 1961
- Cost: $1,000,000

Height
- Roof: 258 ft (79 m)

Technical details
- Floor count: 12

The Metropolitan Building, originally known as the Northwestern Guaranty Loan Building, is considered to be one of the most architecturally significant structures in the history of Minneapolis, Minnesota. It stood from 1890 until it was torn down starting in 1961 as part of major urban renewal efforts in the city that saw about 40% of the downtown district razed and replaced with new structures. At the time, the pending destruction of the Richardsonian Romanesque building provided a catalyst for historic preservation movements in the city and across the state.

== Early skyscraper ==
The building is considered the city's first skyscraper, with 12 stories and standing 218 feet (66 m) tall. Small observation towers poked up above the corners, and the rooftop had a popular garden. It was built of green New Hampshire granite and red Lake Superior sandstone, with the interiors dressed in antique oak and beautiful ornamental iron and brass work by Crown Iron Works Company of Minneapolis. A large skylight allowed the interior to be safely lit in a time when electric lighting was rare (though the building was eventually wired), and the floors of walkways circling the center court were translucent to allow more light to filter through. Architect E. Townsend Mix designed the building, and it is considered to be his most notable achievement. Many of the city's most prestigious companies had offices in the Metropolitan.

When it went up, the building was owned by the Northwestern Guaranty Loan Company. Louis F. Menage, founder, had gained a fortune while speculating on real estate in the Minneapolis area in the 1880s. He spent $1 million on the project. Many hailed the building when it was first completed, although some such as Cass Gilbert did not like the style.

== Downfall ==
The Panic of 1893 caused Menage's company to collapse, and he fled the country. Thomas Lowry, another major real estate speculator and the owner of the area's streetcar network, purchased the building but only held onto it for a little more than a decade before selling it to the Metropolitan Life Insurance Company in 1905. This is where the building gained its "Metropolitan" name, even though it changed hands a few more times before succumbing to the wrecking ball.

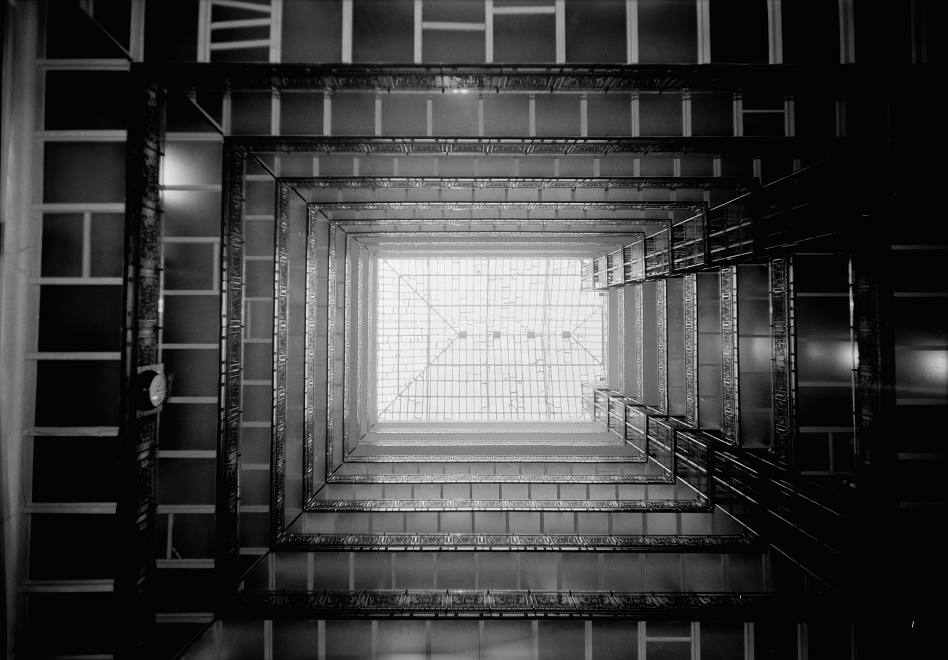
A view up to the skylight

There was little practical reason to tear down the building. Records from the day indicate that it was safe and almost fully occupied at the time it was condemned. The structure came down because it was in the wrong neighborhood—on the edge of the so-called Gateway District, sitting on the southwest corner of Third Street South and Second Avenue South.

== Present day ==
Some giant marble stones from the building were found in an old warehouse in Delano, Minnesota in May 2010, and the owner of the building set off a frenzy when he emailed a small group of architects and historical preservationists in Minnesota who now are trying to find money and a way to save the stones.

The Ice House Plaza, which opened in May 2012, includes several blocks of stone salvaged from the Metropolitan Building. The plaza was designed and sculpted by sculptor Zoran Mojsilov, whose piece white angel is the focal point of the plaza. Located at 26th Street and Nicollet Avenue in South Minneapolis, the public square has a fountain and benches made from remnants of the historic structure.

== See also ==
- Gateway District (Minneapolis)
- Hennepin Center for the Arts
