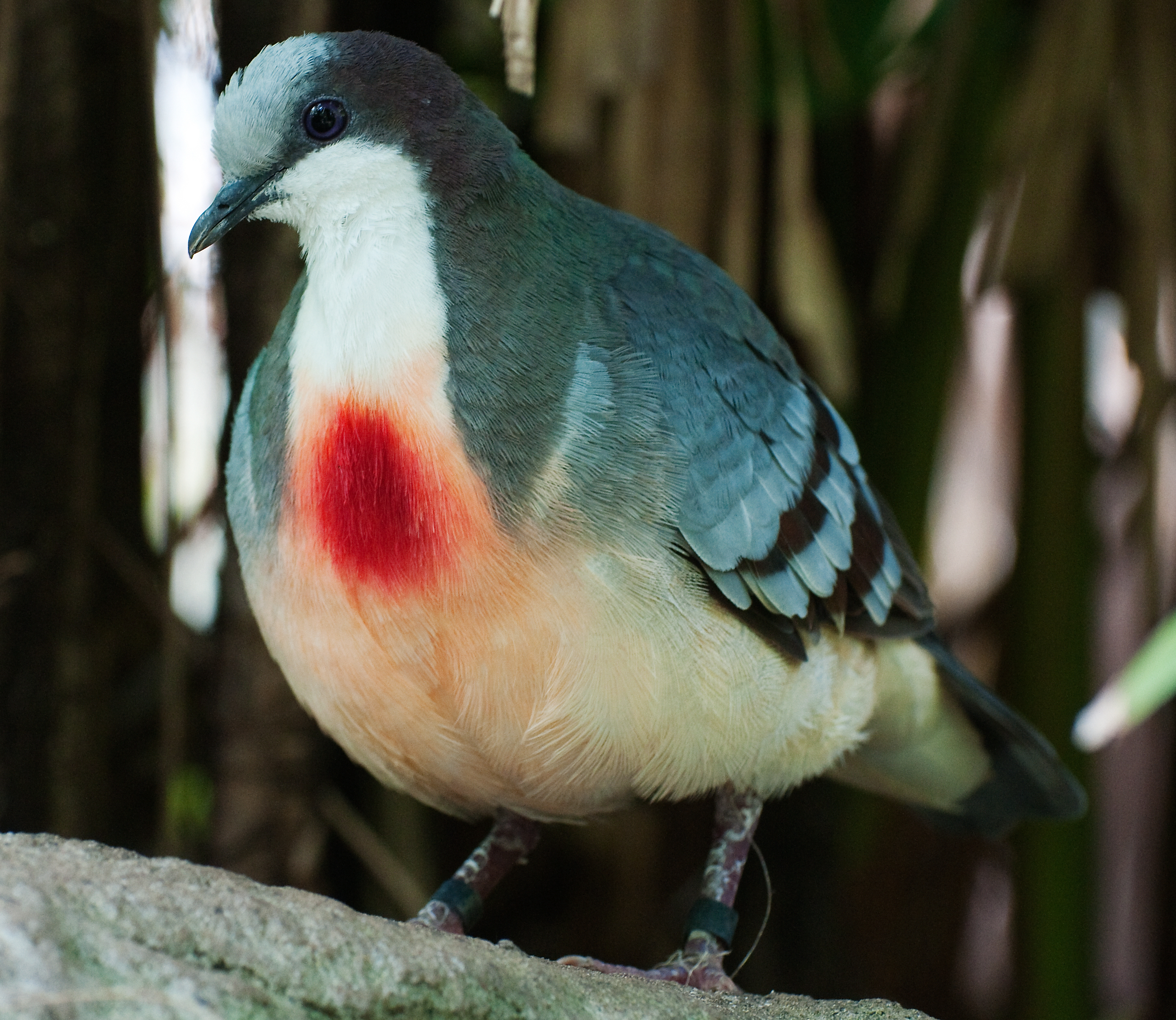
- Luzon bleeding-heart, Gallicolumba luzonica

Scientific classification
- Kingdom: Animalia
- Phylum: Chordata
- Class: Aves
- Order: Columbiformes
- Family: Columbidae
- Tribe: Phabini
- Genus: Gallicolumba; Heck, 1849

Type species
- Columba cruenta Gmelin, JF, 1789=Columba luzonica Scopoli, 1786

Diversity
- See text

Synonyms
- Plegoenas Reichenbach, 1851; Phlegoenas Reichenbach, 1852 (unj. Emend.)

= Gallicolumba =

Genus of birds

Gallicolumba is a mid-sized genus of ground-dwelling doves (family Columbidae), most of which occur in rainforests on the Philippines. Local name 'punay' which is a general term for pigeons and doves. They are not closely related to the American ground doves genus (Columbina and related genera). Rather, the present genus is closest to the thick-billed ground pigeon.

The Filipino species are known as bleeding-hearts due to their vivid-red patch on the breast, which looks startlingly like a bleeding wound in some species and has reminded naturalists of a dagger stab. The diet of doves of this genus consists of fruits and seed.

== Taxonomy ==
The genus Gallicolumba was introduced in 1849 by the German lithographer and author Johann Georg Heck to accommodate a single species, Columba cruenta Gmelin, JF. This scientific name is a junior synonym of Columba luzonica Scopoli, 1786, the Luzon bleeding-heart. The name Gallicolumba is a portmanteau of the genus Gallus that was introduced in 1760 by Mathurin Jacques Brisson for the fowl and the genus Columba that was introduced in 1758 by Carl Linnaeus for the pigeons.

Gallicolumba might be ranked as a (very small) subfamily, but the available data suggests that they are better considered part of a quite basal radiation of Columbidae which consists of many small and often bizarre lineages (e.g. Goura and Otidiphaps which are ecologically convergent to Galliformes, and maybe even the famous didines (Raphinae).

The genus contains seven species:

- Sulawesi ground dove, Gallicolumba tristigmata – Sulawesi
- Cinnamon ground dove, Gallicolumba rufigula – New Guinea and some satellites
- Mindoro bleeding-heart, Gallicolumba platenae – Mindoro (central Philippines)
- Negros bleeding-heart, Gallicolumba keayi – Negros and Panay (Western Visayas; west-central Philippines)
- Sulu bleeding-heart, Gallicolumba menagei – Tawitawi Island (Sulu Archipelago); known only from two specimens collected in 1891; probably extinct
- Luzon bleeding-heart, Gallicolumba luzonica – Luzon group (north Philippines)
- Mindanao bleeding-heart, Gallicolumba crinigera – Eastern Visayas, Mindanao group, and Jolo (north Sulu Archipelago; central east, south, southwest Philippines)

Many of the Pacific ground doves were removed from Gallicolumba (which was non-monophyletic) and reassigned to the genus Alopecoenas, which was later renamed Pampusana.
