= Louis F. Menage =

American real estate developer

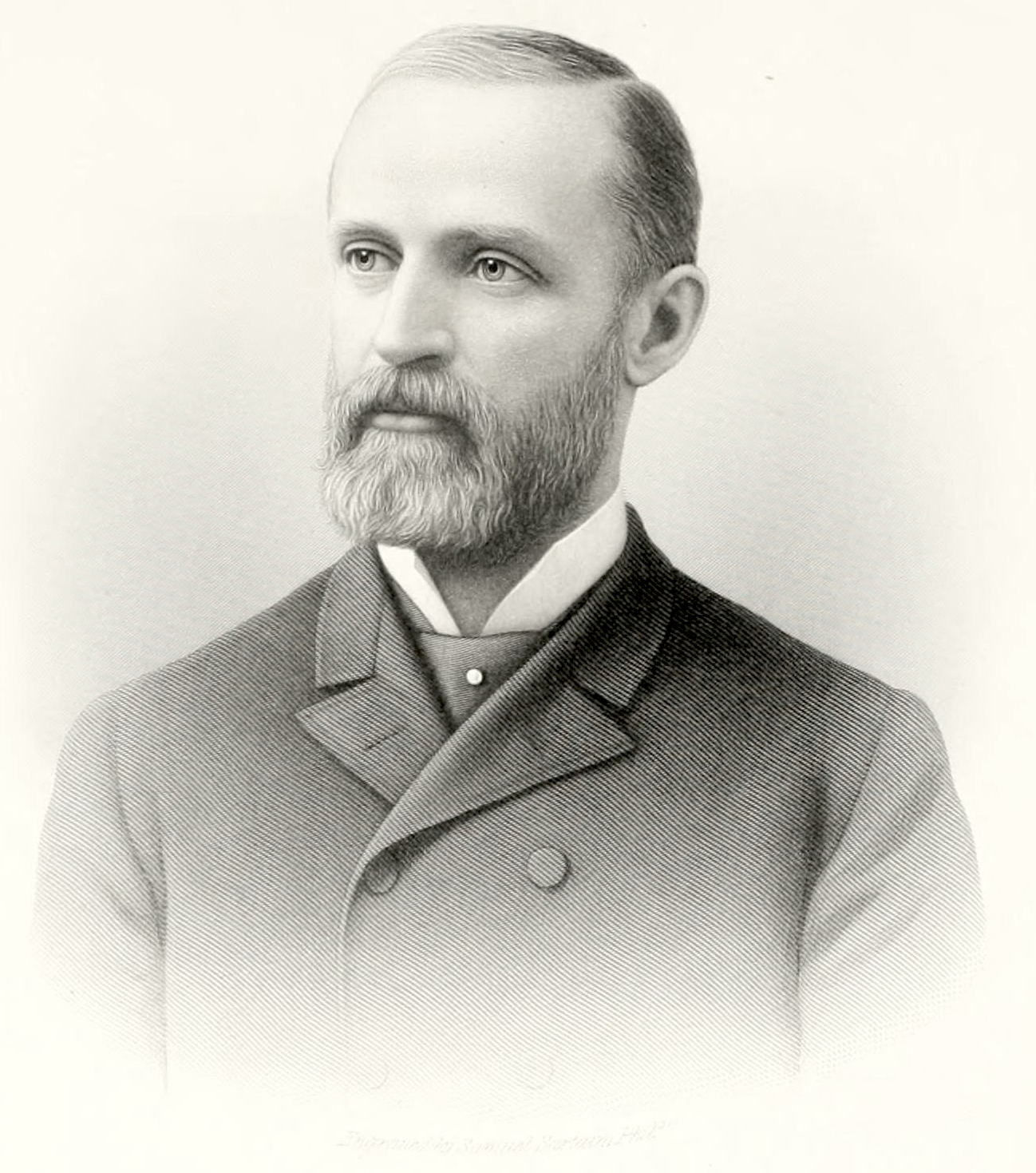
Portrait of Louis Francois Menage

Louis Francois Menage (August 3, 1850 – March 18, 1924) was a real estate speculator and prominent figure in early Minneapolis, Minnesota history. Born in Rhode Island, he settled in Minneapolis in 1874. Characterized as a "tycoon" and "robber baron," Menage earned a fortune developing land on the city's borders into residential housing and financing the mortgages to enable people to buy his properties. During the 1870s and 1880s, he developed large areas of South Minneapolis including much of the area around Lake Calhoun and Lake Harriet. He also developed a luxury resort on Lake Calhoun and built a corporate headquarters which was at the time the city's tallest skyscraper.

After a costly legal battle over a real estate deal with William S. King and the financial downturn of the Panic of 1893, Menage's real estate empire collapsed and he fled the country to avoid prosecution on charges of embezzlement. The charges against Menage were eventually dropped after several key witnesses had died or become hesitant to testify against him. He spent the later portion of his life working in real estate in the New York City area and never worked in Minnesota again.

== Early life ==
Menage was born in Providence, Rhode Island in 1850. His father, John Menage, was the descendant of French immigrants; his mother Mary was a descendant of Mayflower passenger John Howland. The family moved to New Bedford, Massachusetts, when Menage was young. While Menage was in high school, his father died of tuberculosis, leaving Louis and his brother to take over the family's confectionery business. In 1871, a doctor diagnosed Menage with "weak lungs" and suggested he move west to avoid falling ill with tuberculosis himself. Menage moved to Minnesota shortly thereafter. After a brief time teaching classes in shorthand at a Minneapolis business school, he found work as a business clerk in Northern Minnesota at a logging camp near Pokegama Lake.

== Real estate empire ==
In 1874, Menage returned to Minneapolis and entered the real estate business with partner H. C. Brackett. Menage gradually built an empire by purchasing farmland at the fringes of the city, platting and developing the property into residential neighborhoods, then financing the mortgages for people to purchase the homes. He also worked with Thomas Lowry, head of the city's streetcar system, to ensure that new lines were built to serve the outlying areas he was developing. Much of the present day Prospect Park neighborhood, and the areas surrounding Lake Harriet and Lake Calhoun, were developed by Menage and his companies. (Note: Many present day property descriptions in these areas still reference Menage's name in the plat or subdivision names.)

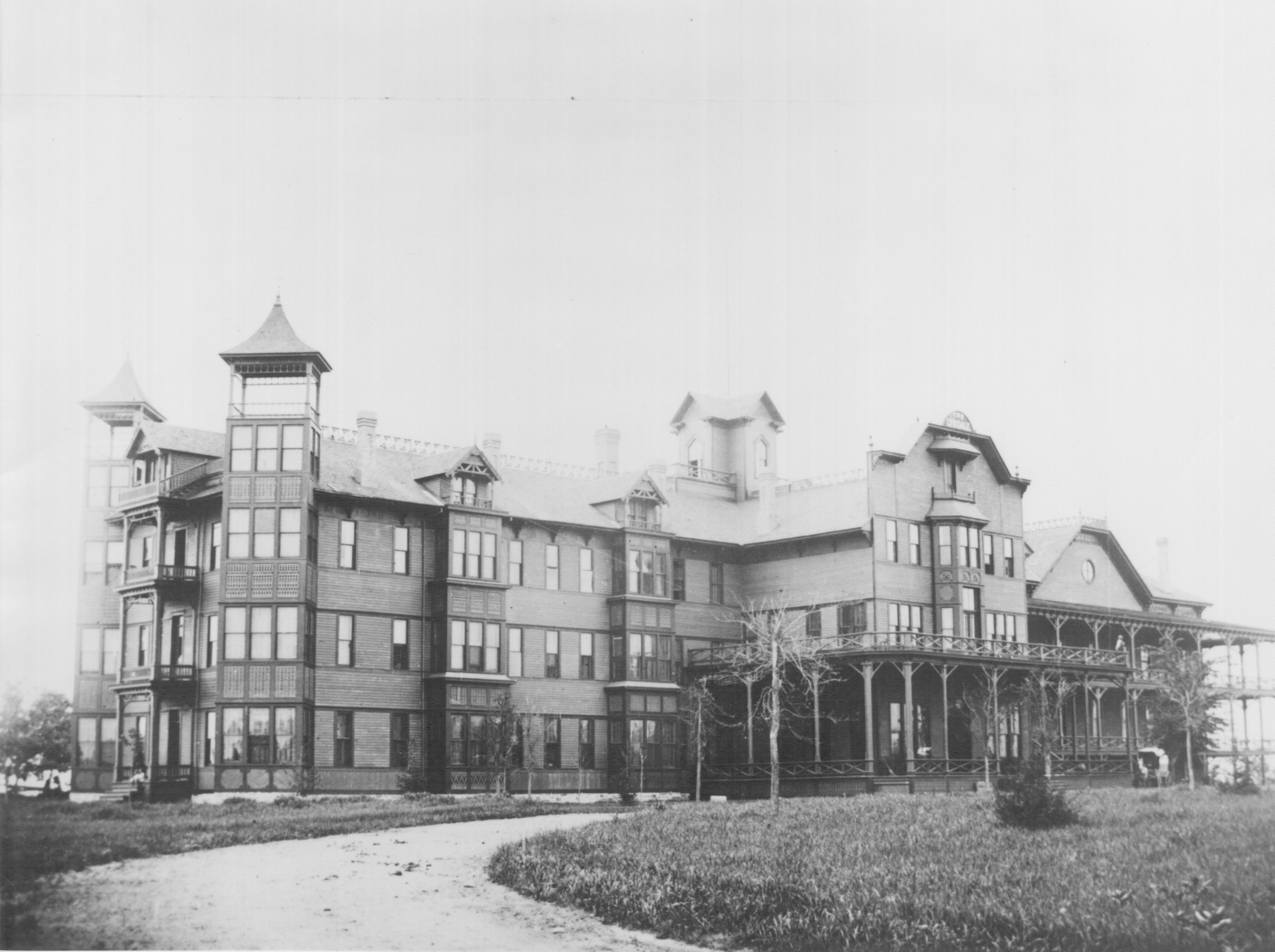
Photograph of the Lyndale Hotel in Minneapolis, Minnesota (c. 1883)

A small inclusion in the title of every property Menage sold was a covenant stating that it would revert to Menage or his descendants if alcohol was ever sold there. Menage would release this covenant in exchange for a small cash payment. (Note: He occasionally waived it entirely, most notably when he sold property for the development of The Minikahda Club.). This so-called "Menage forfeiture clause" remained in force on thousands of properties for decades. The cash payments to release it generated a significant side income for Menage and his successors. In 1937, the Minnesota Legislature passed a law nullifying the clause.

On September 13, 1876, Menage married Amanda A. Bull, daughter of local businessman and Minneapolis pioneer Benjamin S. Bull. They had one daughter.

In June 1883, he opened the luxurious Lyndale Hotel near Lake Calhoun. One of the city's first luxury resorts, the hotel featured multi-room suites and luxurious common areas including a dining room, music hall and two verandas. The hotel's opening was celebrated with a gala attended by many of the city's leaders and elites. A streetcar was specially arranged to take guests back to Minneapolis after the night's festivities had ended.

== Lyndale Farm ==
Menage ran into legal trouble with the purchase of a large plot of land south of Minneapolis known as "Lyndale Farm." Owned by William S. King, the land had been placed in trust with New York financier Philo Remington in 1875 after King had fallen into financial trouble. Remington (joined later by a partner, Robert Innes) advanced King a sum of money in exchange for managing the land and seeing that it was developed or sold for a fair price. When King declared bankruptcy in 1877, Remington and Innes purchased the Lyndale Farm land from King for a token sum but promised to honor their previous agreement.

Remington and Innes later met with Menage and, in 1882, devised a plan to sell King's land to Menage for development without telling King. Menage also negotiated a separate deal with Innes (likely behind Remington's back) where he agreed to pay him one-third of the profits made from the land as a finder's fee and in exchange for Innes' help keeping Remington and King at bay. Menage proceeded to develop the land into housing and profited handsomely.

By 1885, King became aware of the scheme and retained lawyer John Van Voorhis to sue Menage. Menage claimed ignorance of the first agreement between King, Remington and Innes and asserted that he had purchased the property outright from the two. After a lengthy trial in Minnesota District Court, Menage lost and was ordered to return the land to King along with all proceeds from the development of the land. Menage appealed to the Minnesota Supreme Court in 1886, however the lower court's decision was upheld.

The total amount Menage paid to King was approximately $2 million ($69.99 million in 2024). While at the time Menage maintained he was not burdened by the judgment, he later recalled the protracted legal battle and subsequent loss "threatened bankruptcy and ruin."

== Northwestern Guaranty Loan Company ==
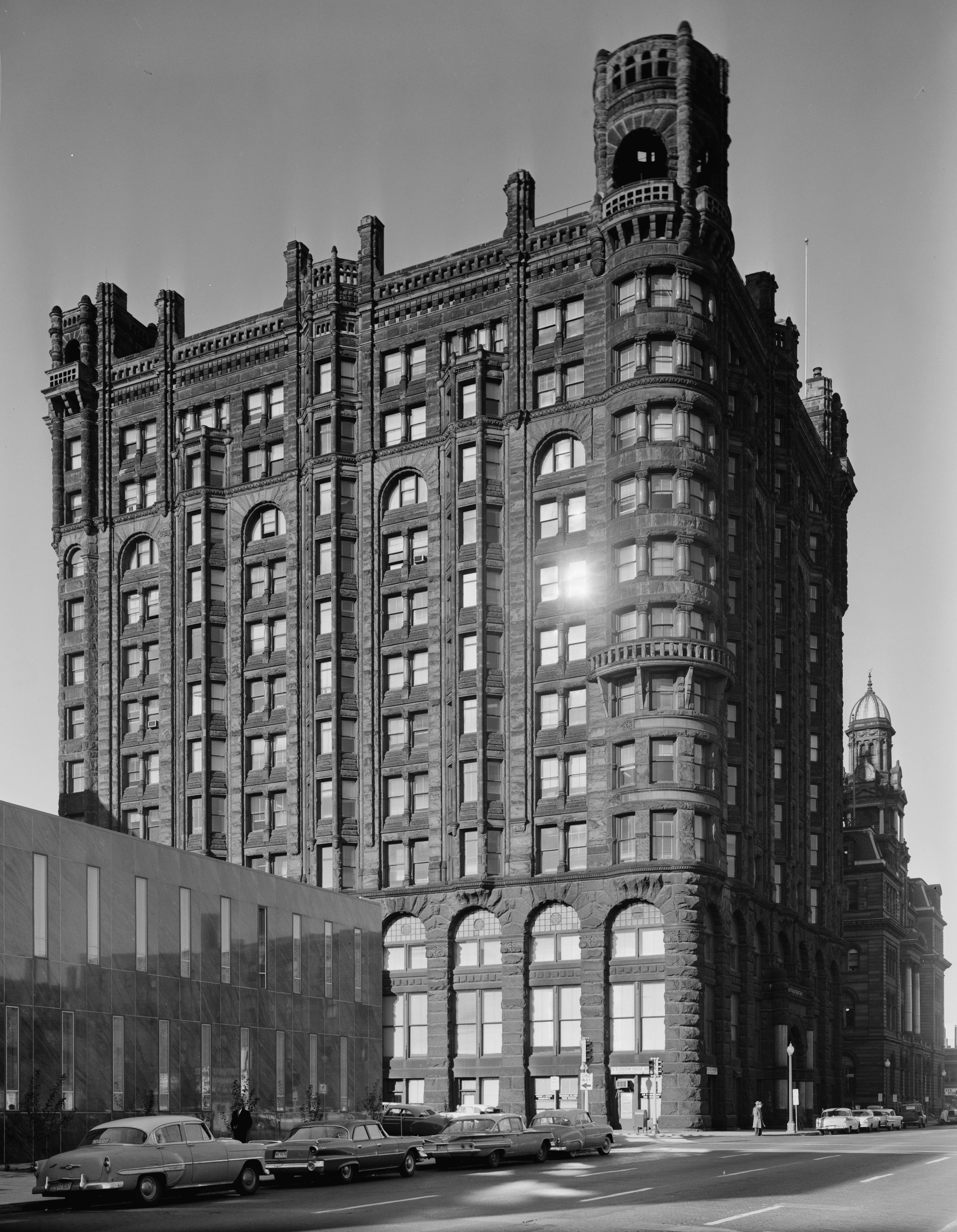
Northwestern Guaranty Loan Building (later Metropolitan Building), 1960s

In 1889, Menage founded the Northwestern Guaranty Loan Company to handle the mortgage side of his real estate business. Among the members of the company's board were: John S. Pillsbury, William D. Washburn, Thomas Lowry, William Henry Eustis, Loren Fletcher, and many other important political and business figures. His real estate business was handled by a separate company called the Menage Realty Company. In 1890, Menage further cemented his place in the city by building the Northwestern Guaranty Loan Building (more commonly known as the Metropolitan Building), the city's tallest skyscraper, at a cost of more than $1 million ($35 million in 2024). The building was home to all of Menage's various companies as well as other offices, a rooftop restaurant, and a private law library.

While Minneapolis was the center of Menage's empire, he also owned land and property elsewhere in the Midwest and western states including Bozeman, Montana, Galveston, Texas, Gary, Indiana, and Madison, Wisconsin.

== Philanthropy ==
Menage contributed to various charitable and philanthropic causes in Minneapolis. He donated funds toward the construction of the first Minneapolis Public Library building, provided a temporary home for the Ripley Memorial Hospital, and also sponsored a new bell in the First Baptist Church which he attended.

In 1890, Menage sponsored a scientific expedition to the Philippines in partnership with the Minnesota Academy of Natural Sciences. The expedition, led primarily by Dean Conant Worcester and Frank Swift Bourns, collected thousands of specimens of birds and animals; some, such as the Philippine slow loris (Nycticebus menagensis) and the Sulu bleeding-heart (Gallicolumba menagei), were named in honor of Menage. While many of the specimens from the expedition appear to have been lost or discarded, some remain in the collections of the Bell Museum of Natural History and the Field Museum of Natural History.

== Financial collapse and later life ==
In the early 1890s, Menage had begun to purchase land near Puget Sound in Washington, accumulating several thousand acres which he planned to develop into an iron mine, smelter and steel mill, along with housing for the workers. To finance the development he sold an early form of mortgage-backed security to investors in New England and Europe. When the Panic of 1893 occurred, investors found that Menage's properties were fraudulent. Many of the deeds were held by random names taken from the Minneapolis and Saint Paul telephone books, the properties themselves were unimproved, and the payments to investors were being made out of the bank's funds.

His Northwestern Guaranty Loan Company (and, by the law of the era, its shareholders) were liable for the losses. Menage was indicted on charges of embezzlement but fled to Guatemala before a warrant for his arrest was issued. Menage's assistant, Donald Streeter, was tried twice but both trials ended with a hung jury. In an 1895 letter, Menage protested his innocence, blaming the Lyndale Farm lawsuit for hurting his finances and also noting (correctly) that: "the practice of using another's name on a note or mortgage is not unknown in the business world." In 1899, the charges against Menage were dropped after several key witnesses had died and others appeared reluctant to testify. By some accounts Menage was present in the courtroom at the time; others suggest he never returned to Minneapolis.

Menage spent the rest of his life living in New Jersey and working in real estate in the New York City area. He died in 1924. He is buried in Lakewood Cemetery in Minneapolis.
