= Frank Swift Bourns =

American physician

Frank Swift Bourns (1866 – 1935) was an American ornithologist and medical doctor. He was involved in two different expeditions to the Philippines with Dean Conant Worcester to gather natural history specimens. From 1887 to 1888 they participated in an expedition sponsored by Joseph Beal Steere. From 1890 to 1892 they returned on an expedition sponsored by Louis F. Menage and the Minnesota Academy of Natural Sciences. The two expeditions yielded thousands of specimens of birds and mammals including newly discovered species such as the Bornean slow loris and Sulu bleeding-heart. After the second expedition Bourns moved to Ann Arbor, Michigan where he completed his medical degree and became a doctor.
