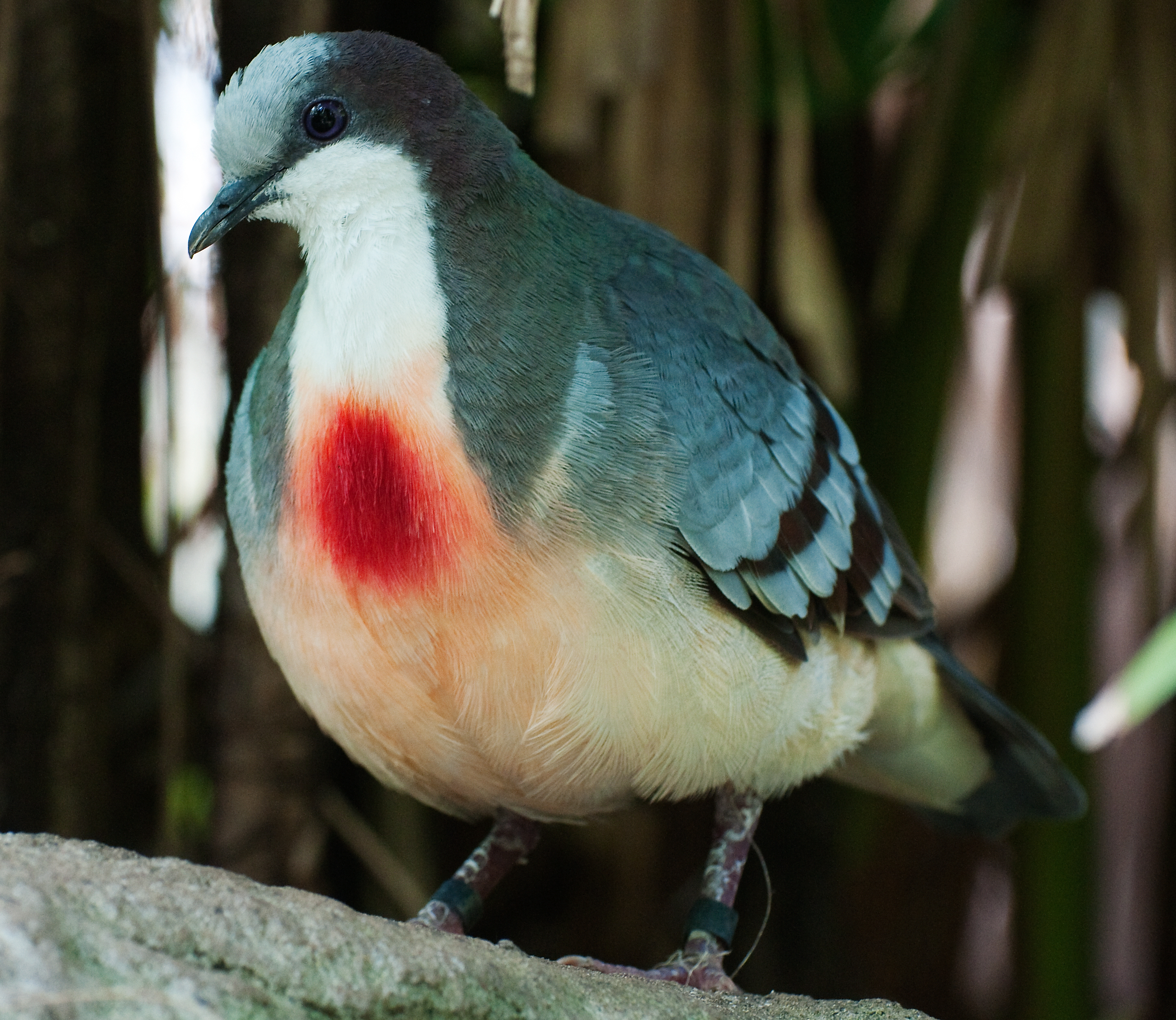

Conservation status
- Near Threatened (IUCN 3.1)
- CITES Appendix II

Scientific classification
- Kingdom: Animalia
- Phylum: Chordata
- Class: Aves
- Order: Columbiformes
- Family: Columbidae
- Genus: Gallicolumba
- Species: G. luzonica

Binomial name
- Gallicolumba luzonica (Scopoli, 1786)
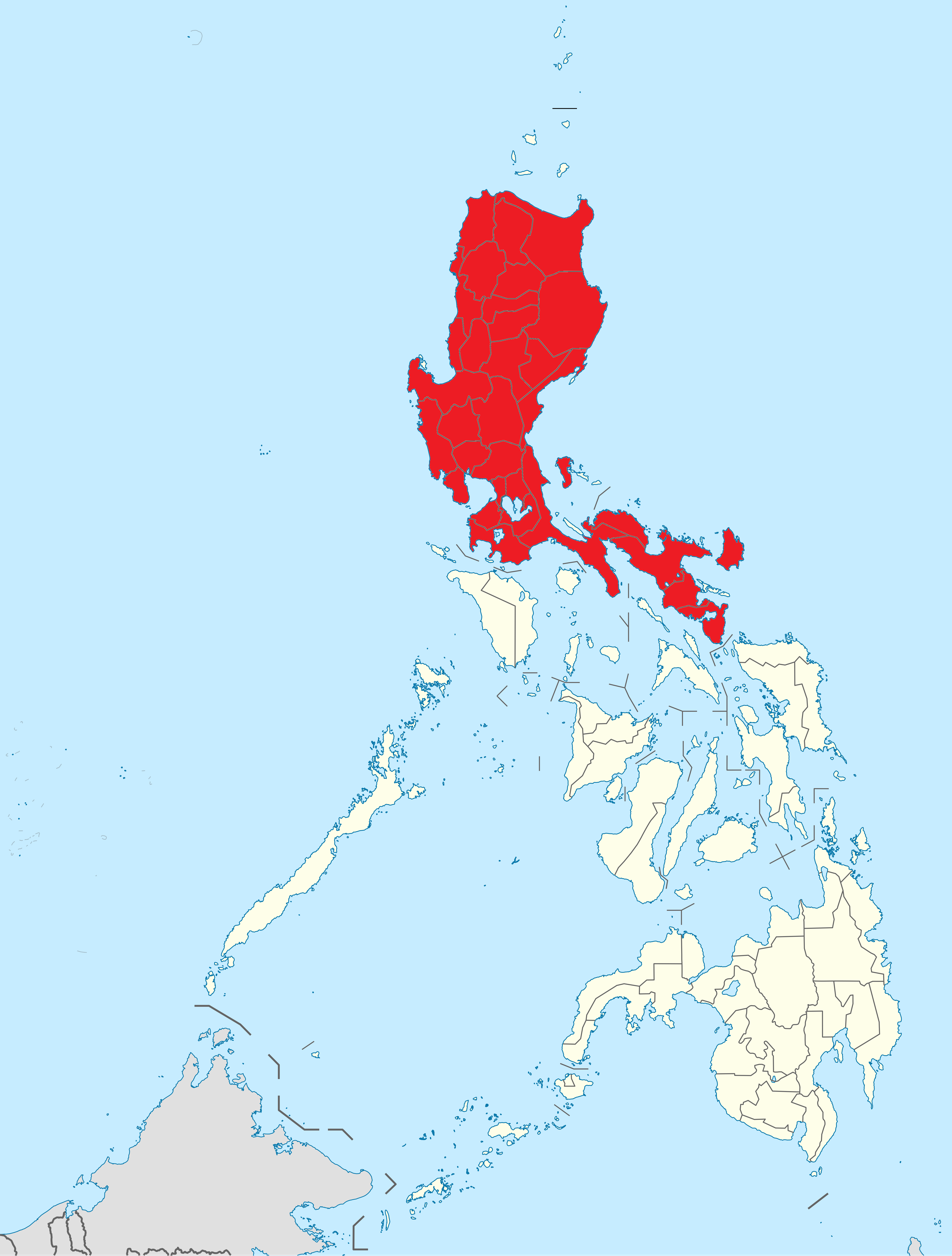

= Luzon bleeding-heart =

Species of bird

The Luzon bleeding-heart, bleeding-heart dove, bleeding-heart pigeon or punay (Gallicolumba luzonica) is a species of ground dove in the genus Gallicolumba, known as "bleeding-hearts" due to the distinctive red patch on its chest. It was also known as paloma de punalada 'stabbed pigeon' but is nowadays more commonly referred to as just punalada. The Luzon bleeding-heart is the species in which the "blood" feature is most pronounced, while the Mindanao bleeding-heart does have a larger red patch, the Luzon bleeding-heart has a reddish hue extending down the belly, furthering the illusion of a blood stain. It is threatened by habitat loss and hunting for the pet trade and for meat.

It is illegal to hunt, capture or possess Luzon bleeding-hearts under Philippine Law RA 9147.

== Description and taxonomy ==
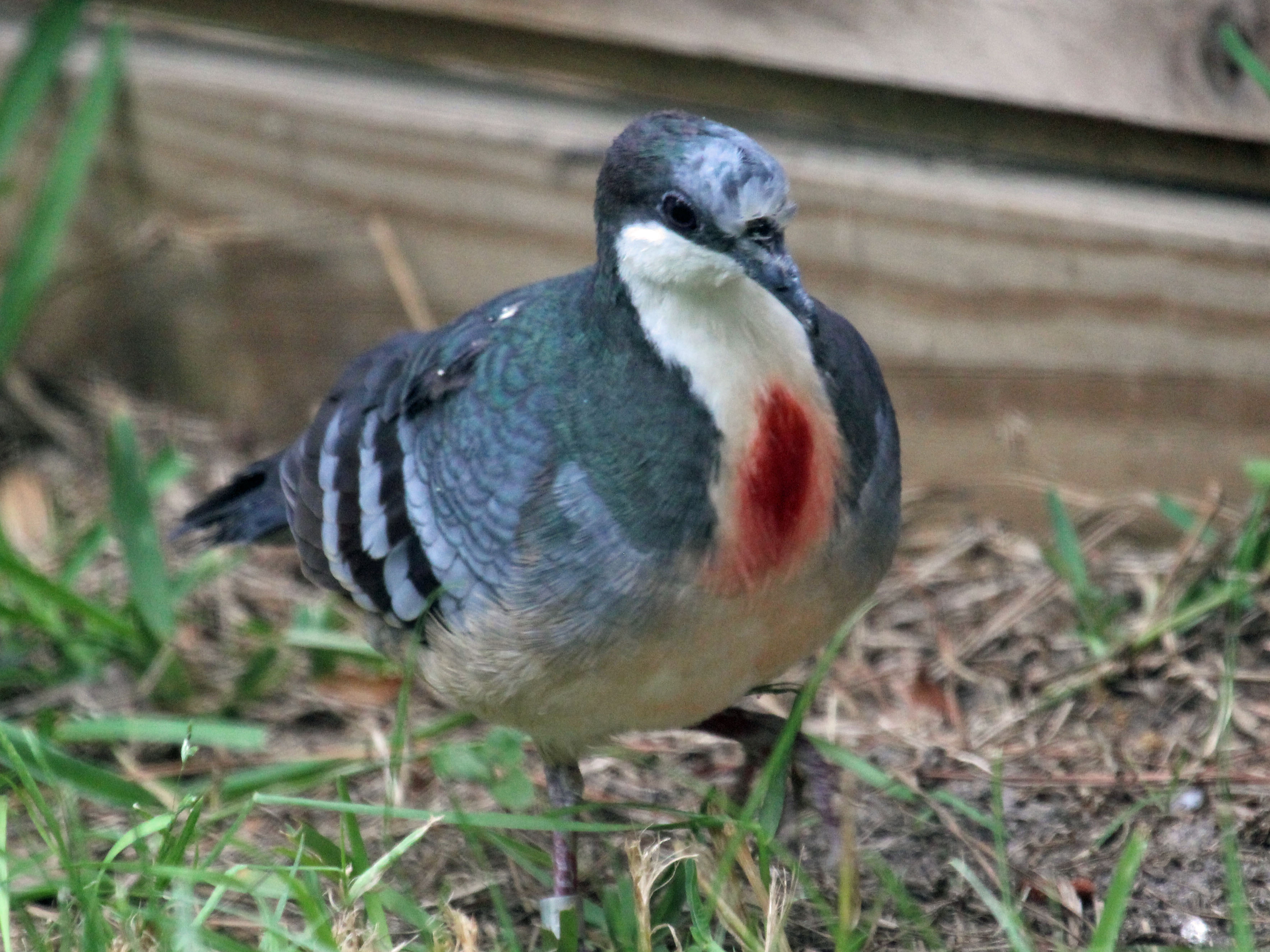
Sylvan Heights Waterfowl Park

It is a medium-sized ground dove. On its upper surfaces, the Luzon bleeding-heart is slate grey in color, but because of its iridescence, it can appear to be purple, royal blue, or bottle-green with varying lighting conditions. On their wings are black bands, while their belly and under wing areas are buff or chestnut. It has a white throat, chest and belly but its most distinctive part is its bright red "bleeding heart" at the center of its chest that has a surrounding faint pink that gives off the appearance of fading blood stains.

There is some slight sexual dimorphism; males tend to be larger and have a more pronounced red patch, while in the females it is slightly duller. The body shape is typical of the genus, with a round body, short tail, and long legs.

Its call is described as a repeated single mournful coo lasting 1 to 2 seconds that rises and falls. It also has a 5 and 3 note display call that is gruffly delivered.

=== Subspecies ===
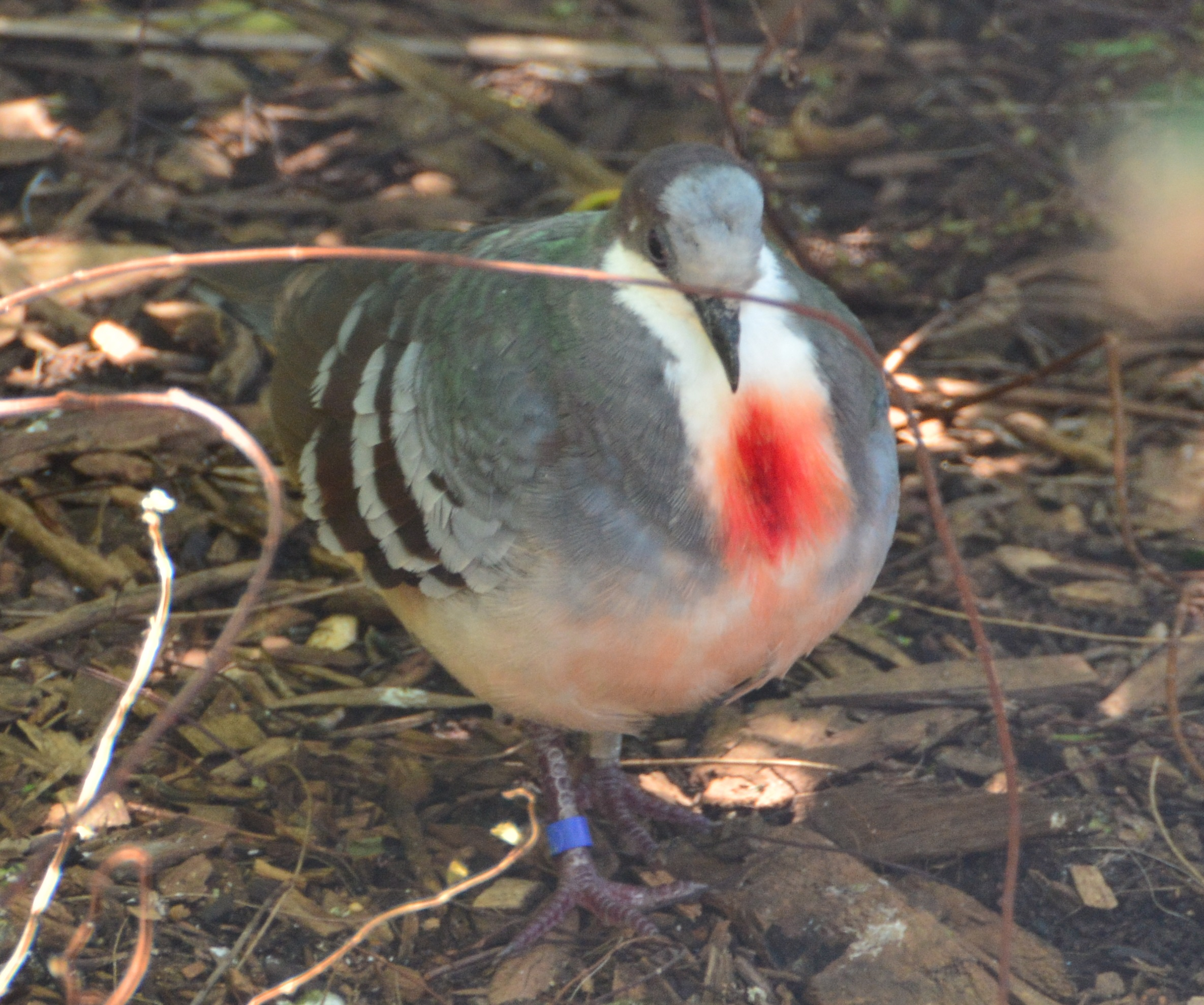
Luzon bleeding-heart at Taronga Zoo, Sydney. Taken November 2013

Three subspecies are recognized:

- G. l. luzonica – Found on Central and South Luzon and Polillo Islands
- G. l. rubiventris – Found on North Luzon; darker and more extensive "heart", pale pink brown belly, paler undertail and smaller
- G. l. griseolateralis – Found on Catanduanes; darker forehead, crown, shoulder, females has darker flanks, undertail but the breast and abdomen is whiter

== Behaviour and ecology ==
They eat seeds, berries and grubs. They are shy and secretive, and very quiet, and rarely leave the ground except when nesting. Unlike the other bleeding-hearts, they usually lay two eggs in each clutch. It has been recorded nesting in May and June.

== Conservation status ==
It lives in primary or secondary forests, and can be found at altitudes up to 1,400 meters above sea level.

The International Union for Conservation of Nature has assessed this species as near-threatened species with the population on the decline. It is threatened by the destruction of its habitat through Illegal logging, conversion into farmlands through slash-and-burn and mining. Its attractive plummage makes it heavily trapped for the illegal wildlife trade. It is also often bycatch and caught in snares by hunters targeting red junglefowl and rails.

It occurs in a few protected areas such as the Northern Sierra Madre Natural Park, Kalbario–Patapat Natural Park, Angat Watershed Forest Reserve, Bulusan Volcano Natural Park, Mount Makiling, Mounts Palay-Palay–Mataas-na-Gulod Protected Landscape and Quezon Protected Landscape however actual protection from habitat destruction and hunters is still lax and these threats persist even in protected areas.

This species is widely kept and bred in captivity but the genetic purity of captive populations is unknown and it is possible the multiple subspecies have interbred. In 2020, Singapore Zoo sent back 10 individuals to be eventually released back into the wild in an unknown location. As of 2024, there have not been any updates on this project if it pushed through.
