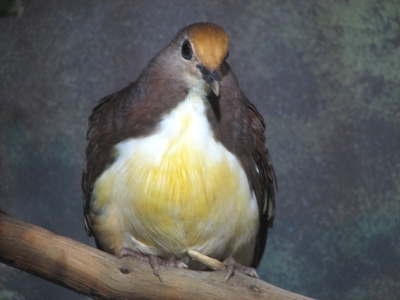

Conservation status
- Least Concern (IUCN 3.1)

Scientific classification
- Kingdom: Animalia
- Phylum: Chordata
- Class: Aves
- Order: Columbiformes
- Family: Columbidae
- Genus: Gallicolumba
- Species: G. rufigula

Binomial name
- Gallicolumba rufigula (Pucheran, 1853)

= Cinnamon ground dove =

Species of bird

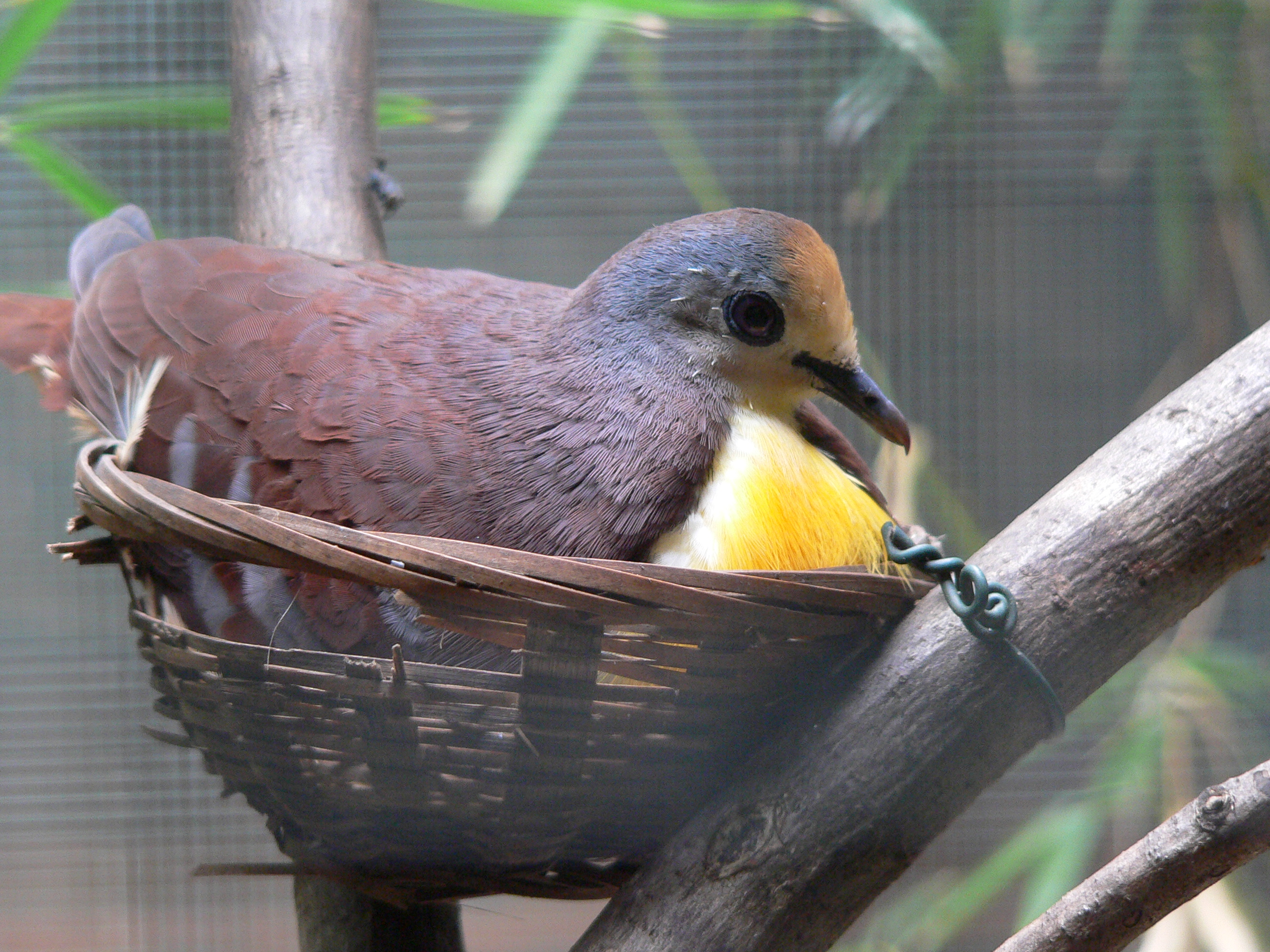
A cinnamon ground dove in a nest.

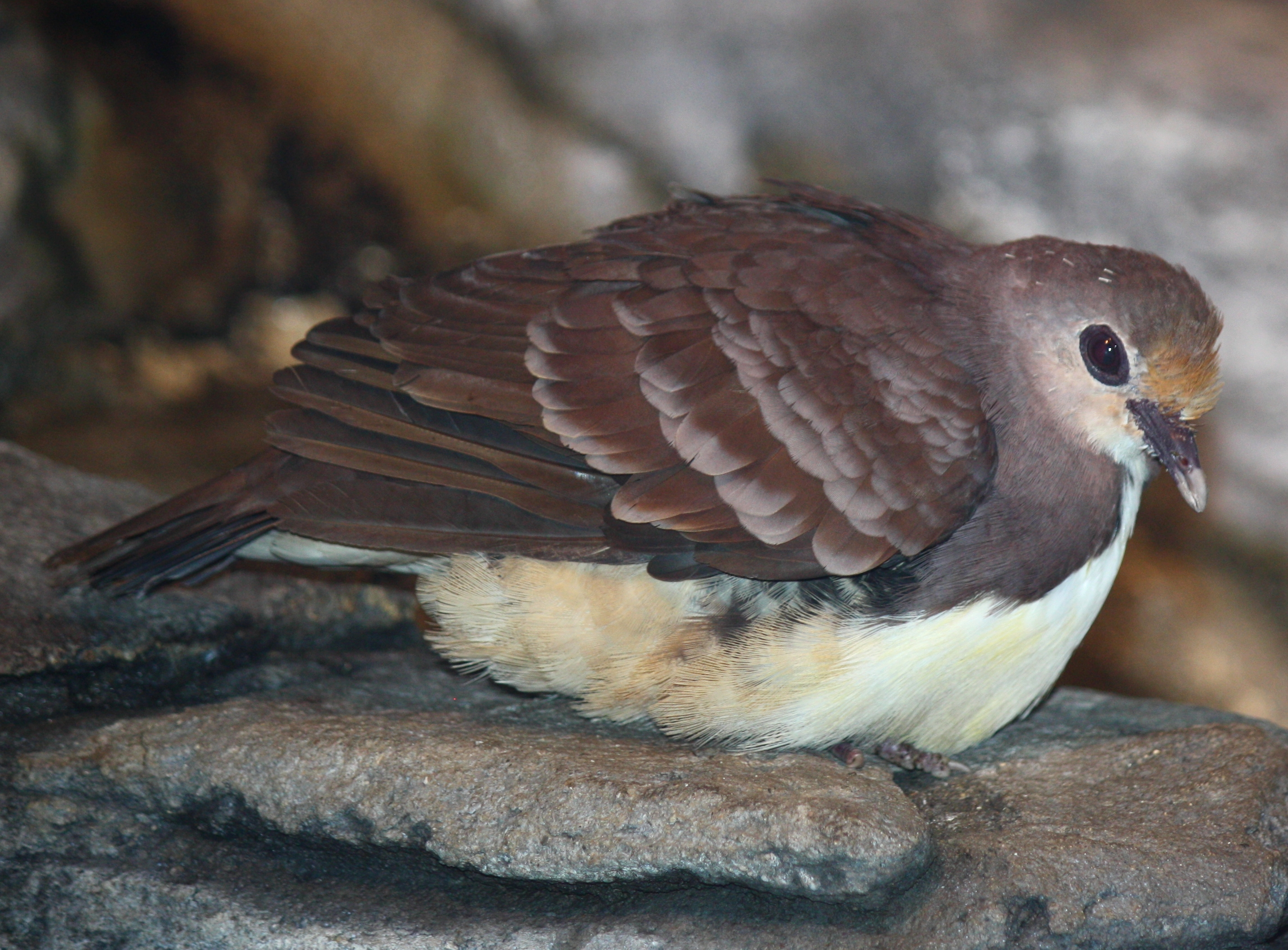
A cinnamon ground dove perched on a rock.

The cinnamon ground dove (Gallicolumba rufigula) also known as golden-heart dove, red-throated ground dove or golden-heart pigeon is a species of ground-dwelling dove in the genus Gallicolumba.

It is native to New Guinea.

== Description ==
The Cinnamon ground dove is around 22–24 cm long and can weigh anywhere from 121-137g. It has a red 'blushing' mark on its head with a light brown, grey colour covering its over-body. It has a yellow marking on its belly which is surrounded by white. Some have blue markings on their heads and body. This medium-sized ground dove, is mostly inhabitant of lowland forests and foothills. Their reddish back and wings punctuated by pale grey-blue diagonal motifs that truly make them much different than other birds in the same genus.

== Voice ==
A faint call sounding like a trill, the bird also has a soft purring sound that lasts for a few seconds.

== Diet ==
The cinnamon ground dove's diet consists mainly of insects but also feeds on fallen fruits, seeds and even ground worms. Its way of scavenging is through the leaf litter that lies on the ground to find most of its food. This particular bird relies heavily on foods that are mostly found on the ground.

== Subspecies ==
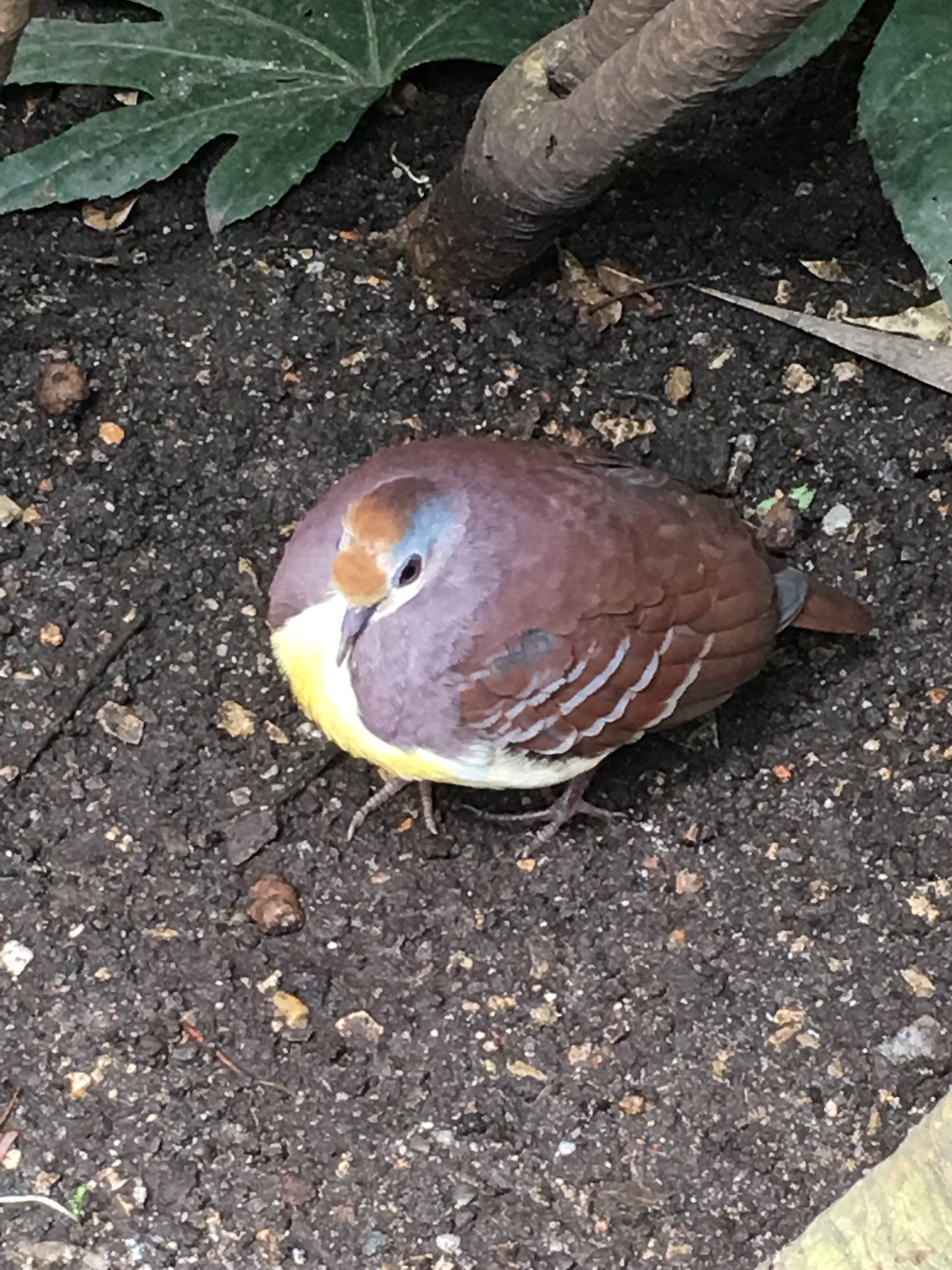
Gallicolumba rufigula rufigula

- Gallicolumba rufigula alaris
- Gallicolumba rufigula helviventris
- Gallicolumba rufigula orientalis
- Gallicolumba rufigula rufigula
- Gallicolumba rufigula septentrionalis
