= Dean Conant Worcester =

American zoologist and ornithologist

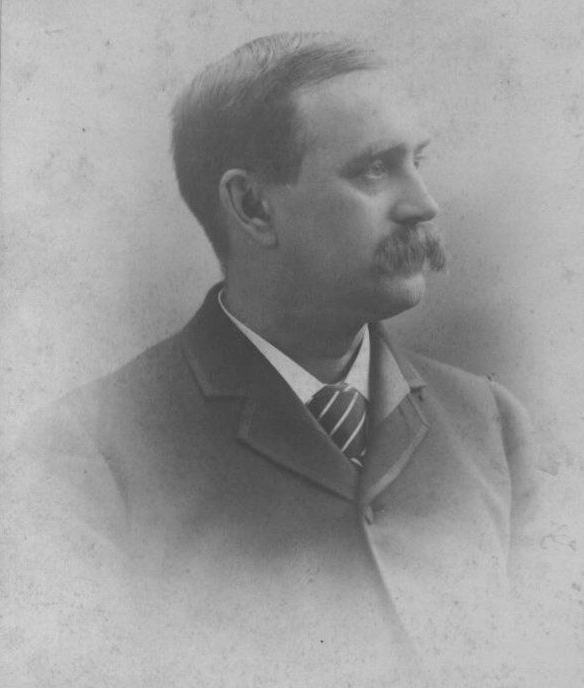

Philippine Secretary of the Interior
- In office September 6, 1901 – September 15, 1913
- Appointed by: William Howard Taft
- Preceded by: Severino de las Alas
- Succeeded by: Winfred T. Denison

Personal details
- Born: October 1, 1866 Thetford, Vermont, US
- Died: May 2, 1924 (aged 57) Manila, Philippine Islands
- Resting place: Pleasant Ridge Cemetery, North Thetford, Vermont
- Scientific career
- Education: University of Michigan
- Fields: Zoology; Public official; Businessman
- Workplaces: University of Michigan, Philippine Insular Government

Notes
- Dean C. Worcester Papers at University of Michigan

Dean Conant Worcester, D.Sc., FRGS (October 1, 1866 – May 2, 1924) was an American zoologist, public official, and writer on the Philippines. He was born at Thetford, Vermont, and educated at the University of Michigan (A.B., 1889). Worcester's involvement with the Philippines began in 1887 when he joined a scientific expedition to the region as a junior member. This experience laid the groundwork for his controversial career in the early American colonial government, which commenced in 1899. He held firm beliefs in the colonial mission and vehemently opposed Philippine independence. Worcester's influence extended as he served as the Secretary of the Interior of the Philippine Islands until 1913. Afterward, he shifted his focus to business endeavors, particularly in coconut farming and processing, cattle raising, and maritime shipping lines. He died in the Philippines, leaving behind a legacy of both public service and entrepreneurial success.

== Early life and education ==
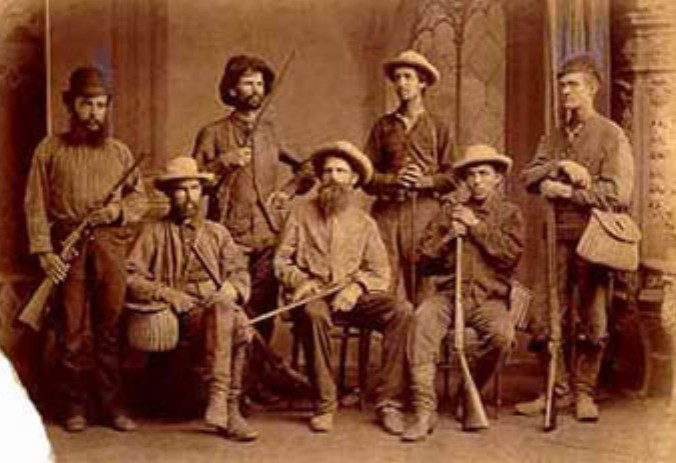
Joseph B. Steere (bottom row center) and his students including Worcester (top, 2nd from left) prior to their 1887 Philippine expedition

Dean Conant Worcester was born on October 1, 1866, in Thetford, Vermont to Ezra Carter Worcester (1816–1887) and Ellen Hunt (Conant) Worcester (1826–1902), the youngest of nine children. He attended public schools in Vermont. He attended high school in Newton, Massachusetts.

Worcester entered the University of Michigan in October 1884, and he was part of the 1887–1888 zoological expedition to the Philippines organized by Joseph Beal Steere in which they collected over 300 zoological specimens, of which 53 were deemed new to science. He graduated with a bachelor's degree in zoology in 1889. Shortly thereafter in September 1890, Worcester and fellow zoologist Frank Swift Bourns returned to the Philippines on a two-year zoological expedition funded by Louis F. Menage, a wealthy Minneapolis businessman who was the major benefactor of the Minnesota Academy of Natural Sciences.

== Public service in the Insular Government of the Philippine Islands ==
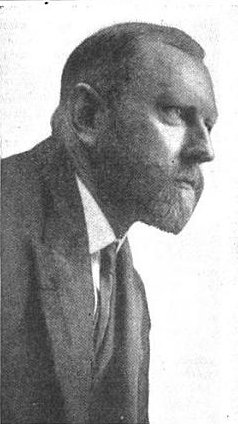
Dean Worcester

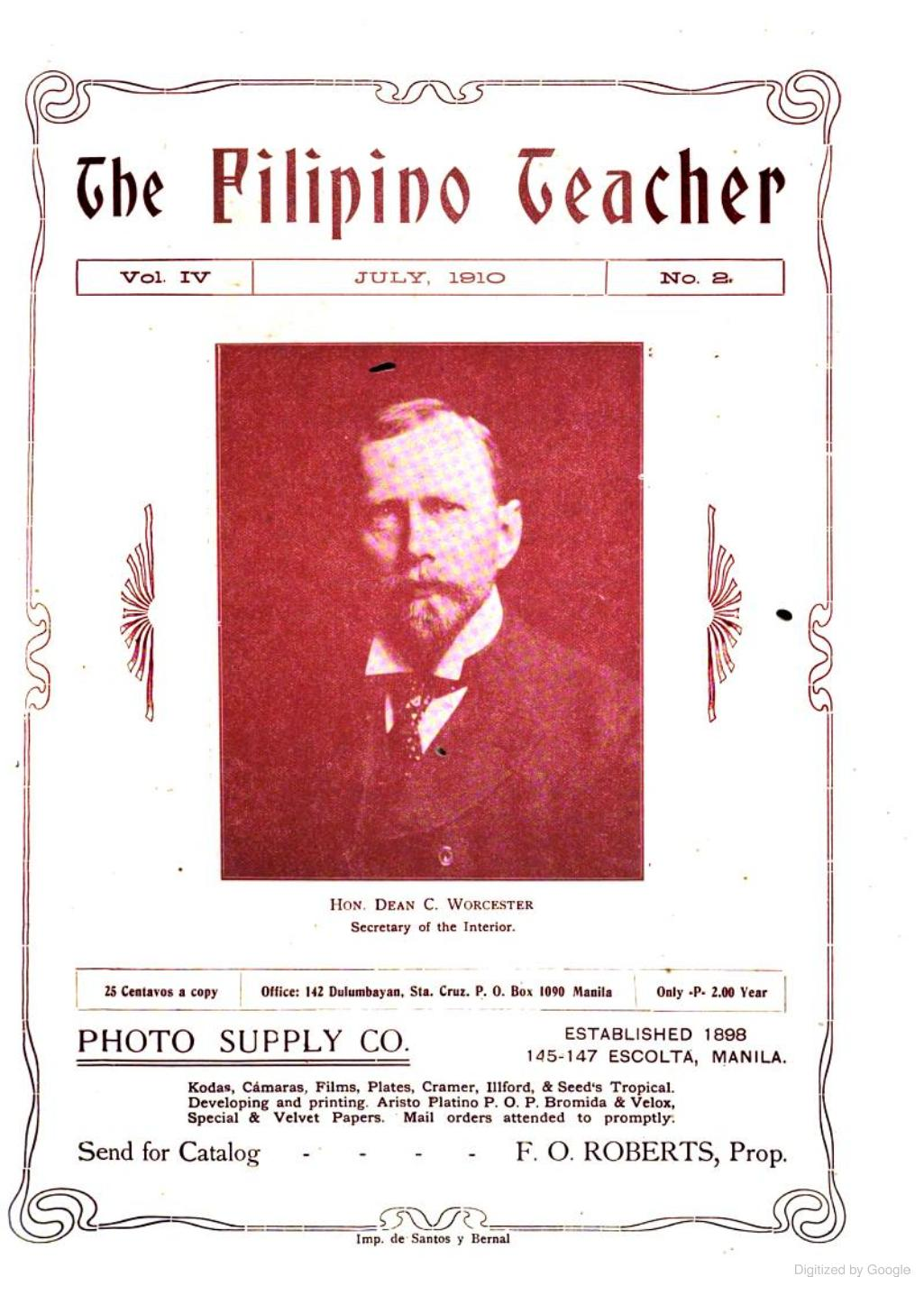
Worcester as Philippine Secretary of the Interior, from The Filipino Teacher dated July 1910

When the Spanish–American War broke out in 1898, Worcester was very quick to capitalize on his first-hand knowledge of the Philippines by engaging in public lectures and establishing himself as a leading authority on the country with the October 1898 publication of his Philippine Islands and their People. Worcester was an avid photographer during his time in the Philippines and his published photographs had a profound influence in shaping public opinion in the United States about the "exotic" Filipinos.

On January 20, 1899, Worcester was appointed by President William McKinley as a member of the Schurman Commission (First Philippine Commission) to make recommendations on how the US should proceed after the sovereignty of the Philippines was ceded by Spain to the US with the Treaty of Paris (1898). He was again appointed on 16 March 1900 by McKinley as the only member from the Schurman Commission to serve on the successor Taft Commission (Second Philippine Commission) where he served until 1913. As a member of the Philippine Commission, he simultaneously served in the highly influential role of Secretary of the Interior for the Insular Government. In this capacity he oversaw the founding of a number of agencies, including the Bureau of Agriculture, Bureau of Science, Bureau of Government Laboratories, and the Bureau of Health. In 1907, he founded the Philippine Medical School and in 1908 laid the cornerstone of the Philippine General Hospital, which opened in 1910 and has become the primary teaching hospital for the University of the Philippines College of Medicine and a hospital for the poor.

Worcester had a keen interest in public health, but his response to a major 1902–1904 outbreak of cholera in Manila and other Philippine cities was highly criticized. The epidemic was particularly severe in the district of Farola in Manila (near present-day San Nicolas) that was home to many of the city's poorest. Worcester ordered the burning of hundreds of houses and forced quarantine of many frightened and homeless Filipinos. Despite these draconian measures taken by Worcester and public health officials, 109,461 people died in Manila and elsewhere in the Philippines. Failure to effectively control this major outbreak and subsequent cholera outbreaks in 1905 and 1908 were major embarrassments for Worcester and drew the ire of the Philippine press often claiming that the public health measures were primarily aimed at clearing slums for the redevelopment of the valuable Manila seaport area. In response, the Insular Department of Interior, primarily under the authorship of Worcester, published a history of these cholera outbreaks with an account of the agency's attempts to control them. In the monograph, he said that he went too far by ordering the burning of the houses in the Farola district.

=== Aves de Rapiña ===
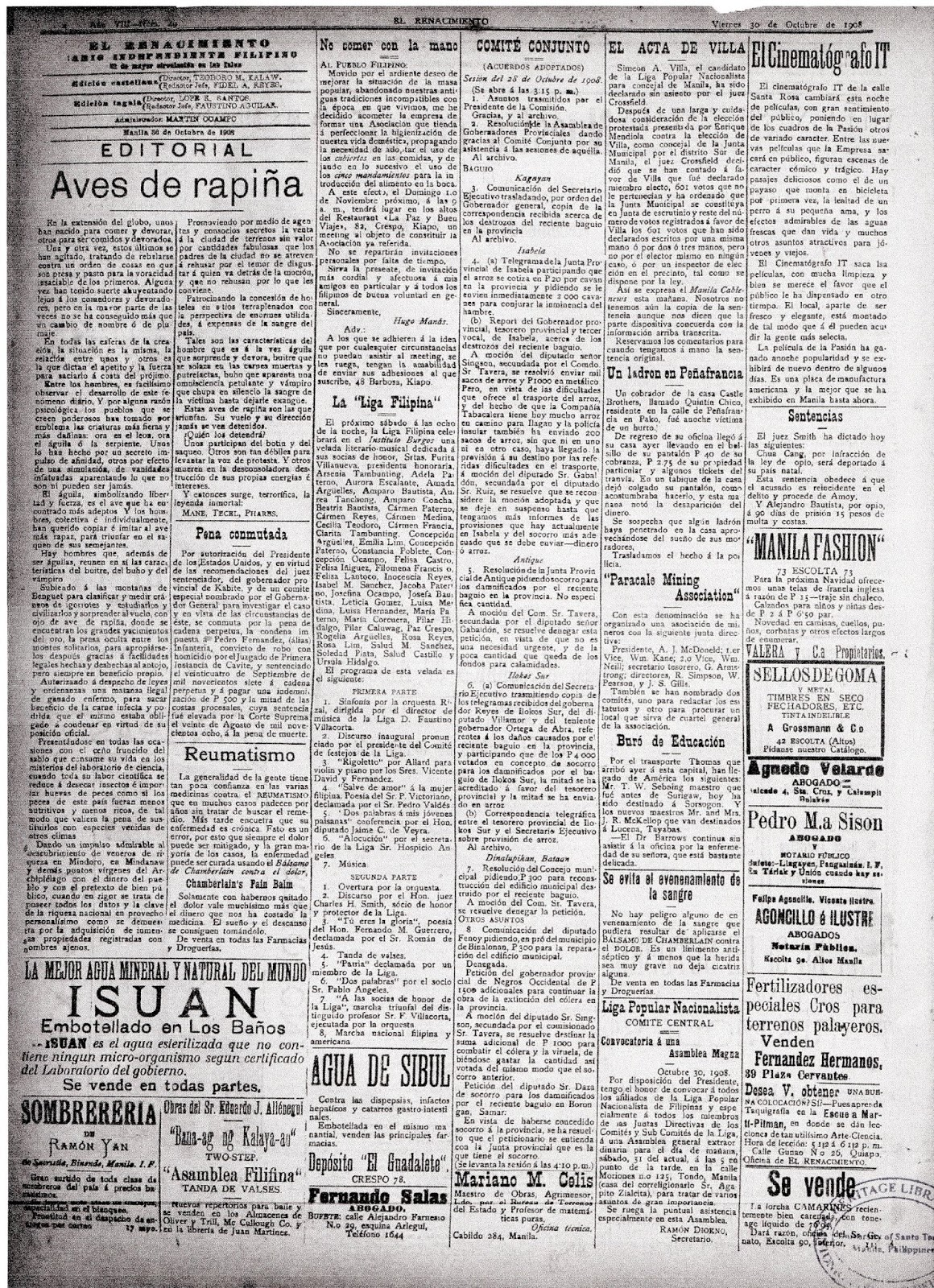
Page 4 of the Year 8, Number 49 issue of the newspaper containing the infamous editorial "Aves de Rapiña"

On October 30, 1908, El Renacimiento, a daily newspaper in Spanish, published an editorial written by Fidel A. Reyes (1878–1967), its city editor, titled "Aves de Rapiña" ("Birds of Prey"), which denounced an American official for using his office to exploit the resources of the country for his personal gains. The article dealt with corruption in the colonial government. Worcester was alleged to have used his anthropological research to seek out gold in Benguet and exploit untapped natural resources in Mindoro and Mindanao. He was also alleged to have profited from the illegal sale of diseased cattle meat and from the sale of overpriced land concessions on government property.

According to historian Ambeth Ocampo, Worcester objected to "insinuation(s) that he was like a rapacious eagle that plundered his fellow men. He was offended by the line that said he had: 'the characteristics of the vulture, the owl and the vampire.'" Although the editorial did not mention names, Worcester felt that he was the public official referred to and filed a libel case against Reyes, as well as editor Teodoro Kalaw and publisher Martin Ocampo, among several others.

The lower court sentenced Ocampo to six months imprisonment and a fine of ₱2,000 and Kalaw to twelve months imprisonment and ₱3,000 fine and a verdict for moral and punitive damages for ₱25,000. The defendants appealed to the Supreme Court of the Philippines, which affirmed the decision of the lower court and to the Supreme Court of the United States, which sustained the decision of the Philippine tribunals.

Governor-General Francis Burton Harrison pardoned Ocampo and Kalaw in 1914 after Worcester left public office in September 1913. Nevertheless, the fines forced El Renacimiento to shut down.

== Post-government and business career ==
In 1911, while serving as Secretary of the Interior, Worcester published a monograph Coconut Growing in the Philippine Islands in which he analyzed the farming technology and economics of plantation culture of coconuts for production of copra and oil. By 1914, this publication had become a standard reference for investors interested in coconut products, and the passage of the Payne–Aldrich Tariff Act (1909) and the opening of the Panama Canal (1914) made for a favorable economic climate for importation of Philippine products, including coconut oil, to the industrial centers of the East Coast of the United States. Beginning in 1908, in his capacity as Secretary of Interior, Worcester acquired large tracts of lands in Bukidnon for the use by large-scale agribusinesses. After resignation from public service, he became more involved in the operations of the American-Philippine Company (AMPHILCO) and its three subsidiaries in which he was an investor: the Insular Transportation Company, the Bukidnon Plantation Company, and the Visayan Refining Company. Considerable American investments were being made in these companies.

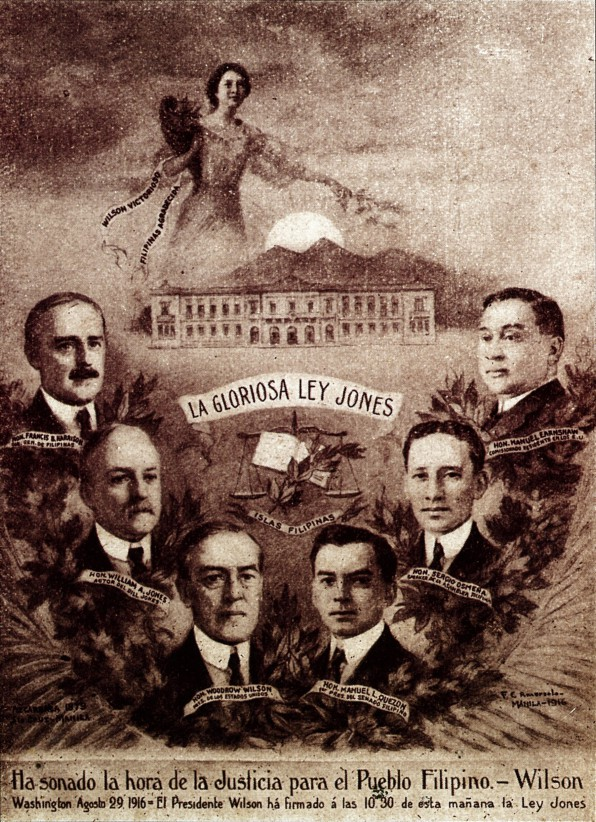
A poster advertising the passage of the Jones Law

Despite Worcester's resignation from public office, Worcester remained as a focus of Filipino animosity largely for his unfavorable depiction of Filipinos in The Philippine Islands and Their People and his high-profile public opposition of the 1912 and 1914 "Jones Bills" that were eventually passed by the United States Congress as the Jones Act of 1916 that restructured the Insular Government and began a process for full Philippine independence. On July 24, 1915, a popular protest broke out in Cebu in which Worcester was denounced as the coconut agribusiness company manager, demanding his replacement. In early 1916, Philippine nationalist Maximo M. Kalaw wrote an editorial in the Cebu newspaper El Precursor titled "Mr. Worcester and the Filipinos must part forever" in which he asserted that the Cebu protests were like the protests against George III if early Americans were presented to the British public as mostly Indian savages that were incapable of self-government. At issue according to Kalaw was that Worcester had published in 1914 The Philippines Past and Present in which he again used the power of his photography to depict "primitive" Filipinos juxtaposed with photos of the modern infrastructure brought by the Americans, particularly during his own tenure as Secretary of the Interior. However, the protests against Worcester subsided in late 1916 once the Jones Act was passed into law and the coconut oil exports were beginning to substantially fuel the local economy in Cebu. Historians Rodney J. Sullivan and Michael Culinane have both pointed out that this later muted response toward American businesses in Cebu was largely because some of the leading families such as the Osmeñas and the Kalaws themselves were major beneficiaries of the economic development brought by Worcester and the other Americans.

In 1914, Worcester also had become involved in the cattle ranching operations at the Diklum Ranch (another subsidiary of AMPHILCO), a 10,000 hectare tract of grasslands on the Bukidnon Plateau in Manolo Fortich, Bukidnon, near the port city of Cagayan de Oro. Cattle ranching began in Bukidnon in the mid-1900s from Shorthorn stock originally imported from Texas, but Worcester had taken what had been learned from experiments undertaken by the Bureau of Agriculture to crossbreed cattle from different parts of the world, including the zebu from India for better performance and disease resistance in a tropics. Later in the early 1920s, he promoted the introduction of the newly developed Santa Gertrudis breed from South Texas into the Philippines as well. Worcester also had close relations with Dr. William Hutchins Boynton (1881–1959) the chief veterinary pathologist with the Bureau of Agriculture who by 1918 had developed an early vaccine for rinderpest, a devastating disease of cattle. In addition to the corporate Diklum Ranch, Worcester also managed his own ranch located in Barangay Lurugan, Valencia, which was then managed by his son Frederick after his death. With Worcester's scientific approach to cattle ranching, the business became highly profitable and provided enough supply to greatly diminish cattle imports from as far away as China and Australia that had been occurring since the Philippine–American War had reduced cattle production by as much as 90%.

Worcester died on May 2, 1924, in Manila. In the reports of his death, the Manila newspapers El Debate and The Manila Times recognized his shortcomings as a public official and political polemicist but acknowledged that he was an outstanding entrepreneur and major contributor to the three Philippine businesses of coconut farming and processing, cattle ranching and seagoing transport.

== Selected publications ==
His publications include, besides various academic papers:

- The Philippine Islands and Their People (1898)
- The Non-Christian Tribes of Northern Luzon (1906)
- The Philippines Past and Present (two volumes, 1913; new edition, 1914)
