= List of birds of Panama =

The harpy eagle is Panama's national bird.

This is a list of the bird species recorded in Panama. The avifauna of Panama included a total of 1020 species as of July 2023, according to Bird Checklists of the World (Avibase). Three species have been added from other sources. Of the 1021 species, 125 are rare or accidental and six have been introduced by humans. Seven are endemic. An additional accidental species has been added from another source.

This list is presented in the taxonomic sequence of the Check-list of North and Middle American Birds, 7th edition through the 63rd Supplement, published by the American Ornithological Society (AOS). Common and scientific names are also those of the Check-list, except that the common names of families are from the Clements taxonomy because the AOS list does not include them.

Unless otherwise noted, the species on this list are considered to occur regularly in Panama as permanent residents, summer or winter visitors, or migrants. The following tags have been used to highlight several categories of occurrence. The tags and notes of population status are from Bird Checklists of the World.

- (A) Accidental - a species that rarely or accidentally occurs in Panama
- (E) Endemic - a species endemic to Panama
- (I) Introduced - a species introduced to Panama as a consequence, direct or indirect, of human actions

== Screamers ==
Order: Anseriformes Family: Anhimidae

The screamers are a small family of birds related to the ducks. They are large, bulky birds, with a small downy head, long legs, and large feet which are only partially webbed. They have large spurs on their wings which are used in fights over mates and in territorial disputes.

- Northern screamer, Chauna chavaria (A)

== Tinamous ==
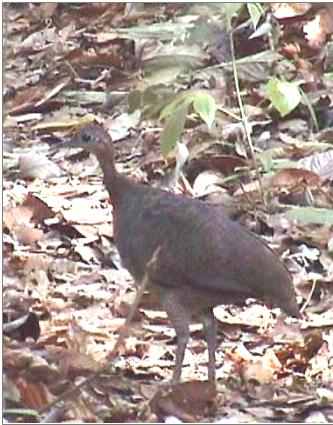
Great tinamou, fairly common in undisturbed forest but difficult to see.

Order: Tinamiformes Family: Tinamidae

The tinamous are one of the most ancient groups of birds. Although they look similar to other ground-dwelling birds like quail and grouse, they have no close relatives and are classified as a single family, Tinamidae, within their own order, the Tinamiformes. They are distantly related to the ratites (order Struthioniformes) which includes the rheas, emu, and kiwis.

- Highland tinamou, Nothocercus bonapartei
- Great tinamou, Tinamus major (near-threatened)
- Little tinamou, Crypturellus soui
- Choco tinamou, Crypturellus kerriae (vulnerable)

== Ducks, geese, and waterfowl ==
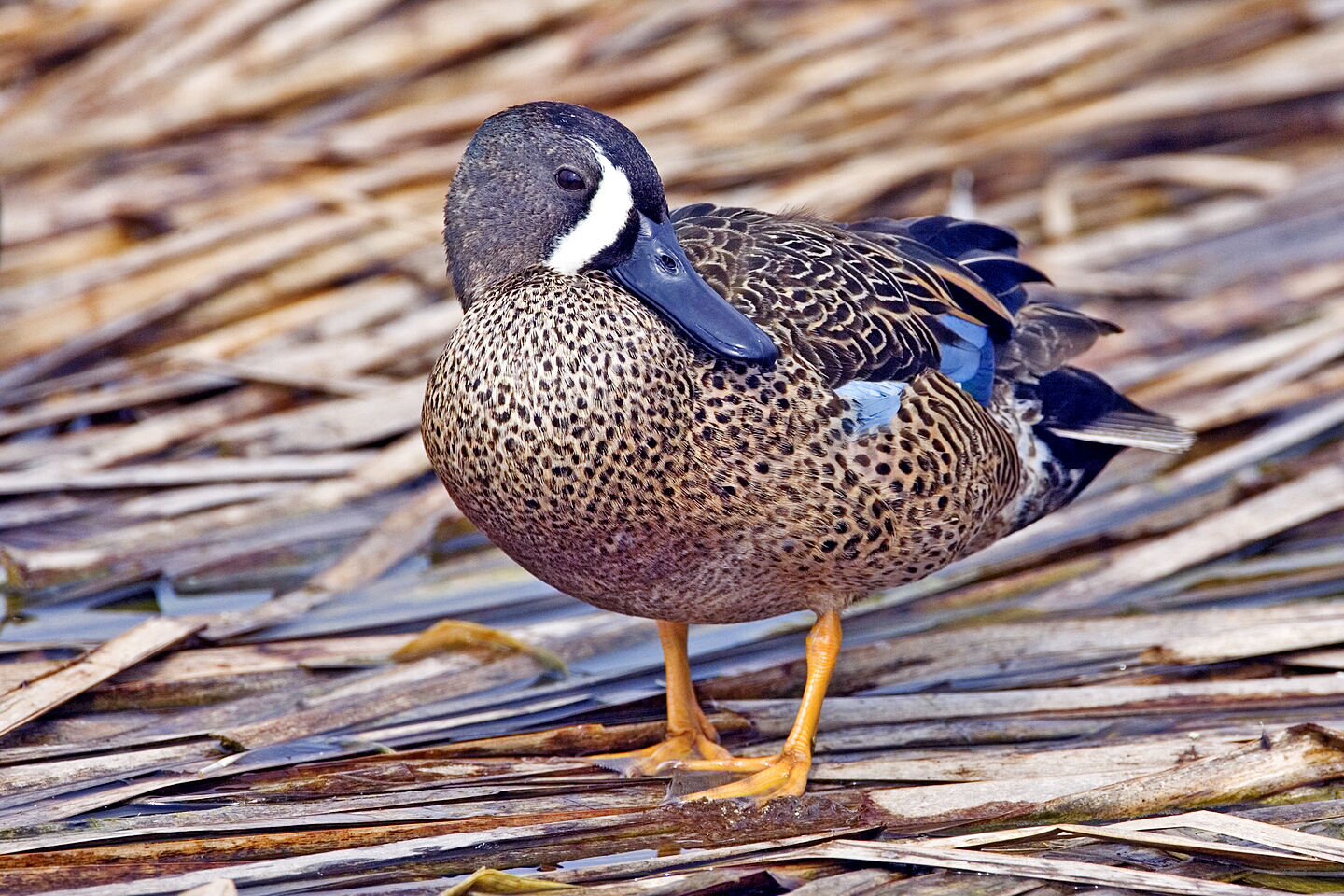
A male blue-winged teal; this migrant from the north is the commonest duck in Panama.

Order: Anseriformes Family: Anatidae

Anatidae includes the ducks and most duck-like waterfowl, such as geese and swans. These birds are adapted to an aquatic existence with webbed feet, flattened bills, and feathers that are excellent at shedding water due to an oily coating.

- White-faced whistling-duck, Dendrocygna viduata (A)
- Black-bellied whistling-duck, Dendrocygna autumnalis
- Fulvous whistling-duck, Dendrocygna bicolor (A)
- Comb duck, Sarkidiornis sylvicola
- Muscovy duck, Cairina moschata
- Blue-winged teal, Spatula discors
- Cinnamon teal, Spatula cyanoptera (A)
- Northern shoveler, Spatula clypeata (A)
- American wigeon, Mareca americana
- Mallard, Anas platyrhynchos (A)
- White-cheeked pintail, Anas bahamensis (A)
- Northern pintail, Anas acuta (A)
- Green-winged teal, Anas crecca (A)
- Ring-necked duck, Aythya collaris
- Lesser scaup, Aythya affinis
- Red-breasted merganser, Mergus serrator (A)
- Masked duck, Nomonyx dominicus

== Guans, chachalacas, and curassows ==
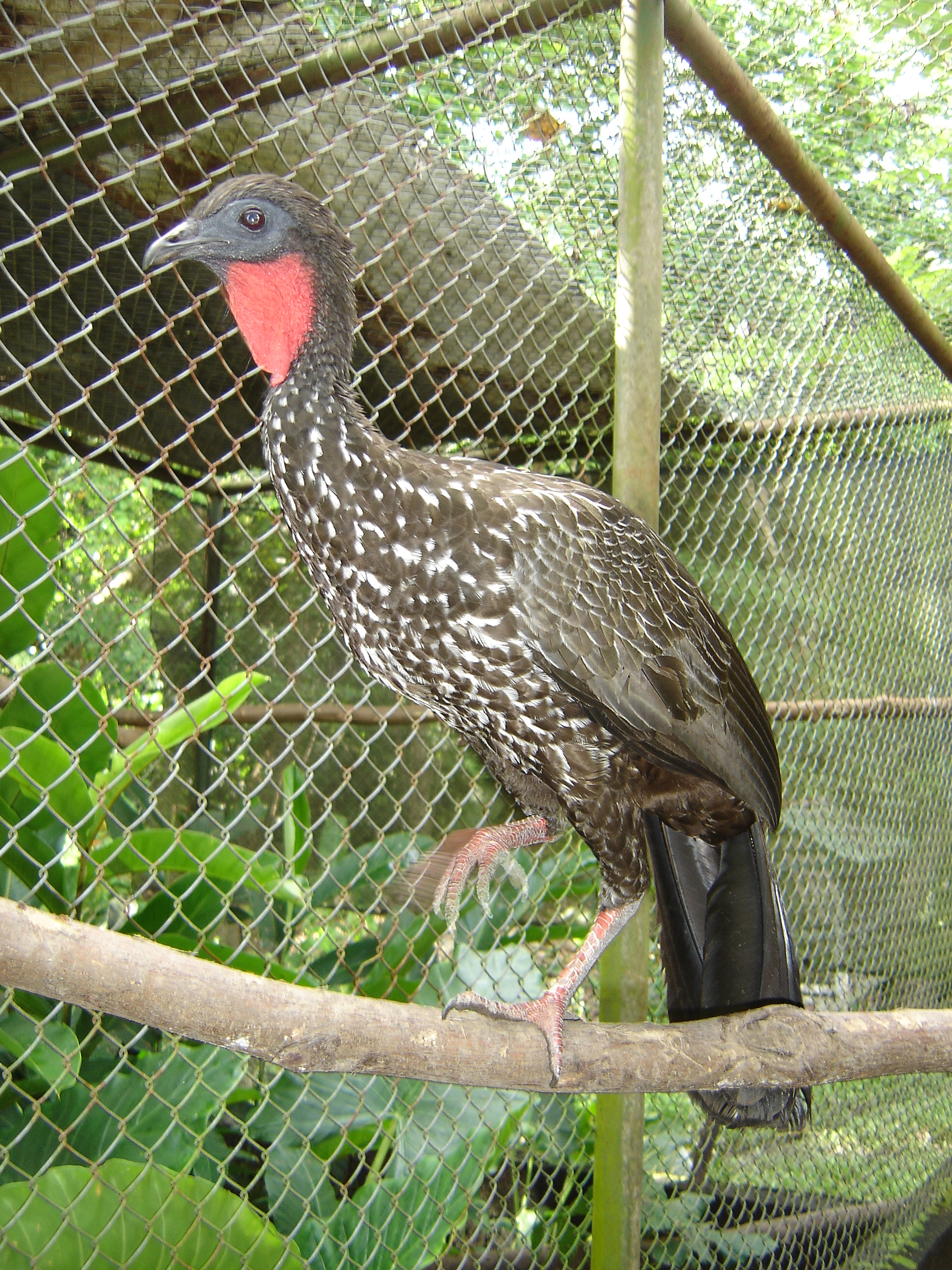
Crested guan, which has decreased in numbers due to hunting and deforestation.

Order: Galliformes Family: Cracidae

The Cracidae are large birds, similar in general appearance to turkeys. The guans and curassows live in trees, but the smaller chachalacas are found in more open scrubby habitats. They are generally dull-plumaged, but the curassows and some guans have colorful facial ornaments.

- Gray-headed chachalaca, Ortalis cinereiceps
- Baudo guan, Penelope ortoni (A) (endangered)
- Crested guan, Penelope purpurascens
- Black guan, Chamaepetes unicolor
- Great curassow, Crax rubra (vulnerable)

== New World quail ==
Order: Galliformes Family: Odontophoridae

The New World quail are small, plump terrestrial birds only distantly related to the quails of the Old World, but named for their similar appearance and habits.

- Tawny-faced quail, Rhynchortyx cinctus
- Crested bobwhite, Colinus cristatus
- Marbled wood-quail, Odontophorus gujanensis (near-threatened)
- Black-eared wood-quail, Odontophorus melanotis
- Tacarcuna wood-quail, Odontophorus dialeucos (A) (vulnerable)
- Black-breasted wood-quail, Odontophorus leucolaemus
- Spotted wood-quail, Odontophorus guttatus

== Grebes ==
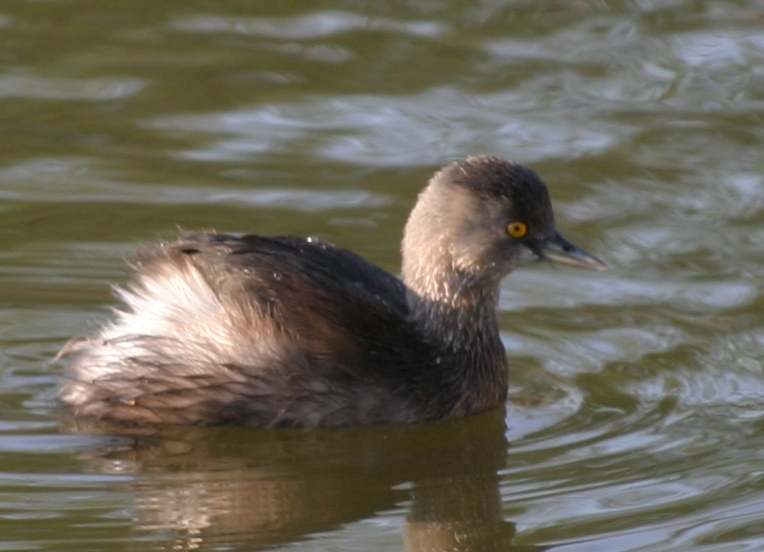
Least grebe is fairly common on lakes and ponds.

Order: Podicipediformes Family: Podicipedidae

Grebes are small to medium-large freshwater diving birds. They have lobed toes and are excellent swimmers and divers. However, they have their feet placed far back on the body, making them quite ungainly on land.

- Least grebe, Tachybaptus dominicus
- Pied-billed grebe, Podilymbus podiceps (A) (vulnerable)

== Pigeons and doves ==
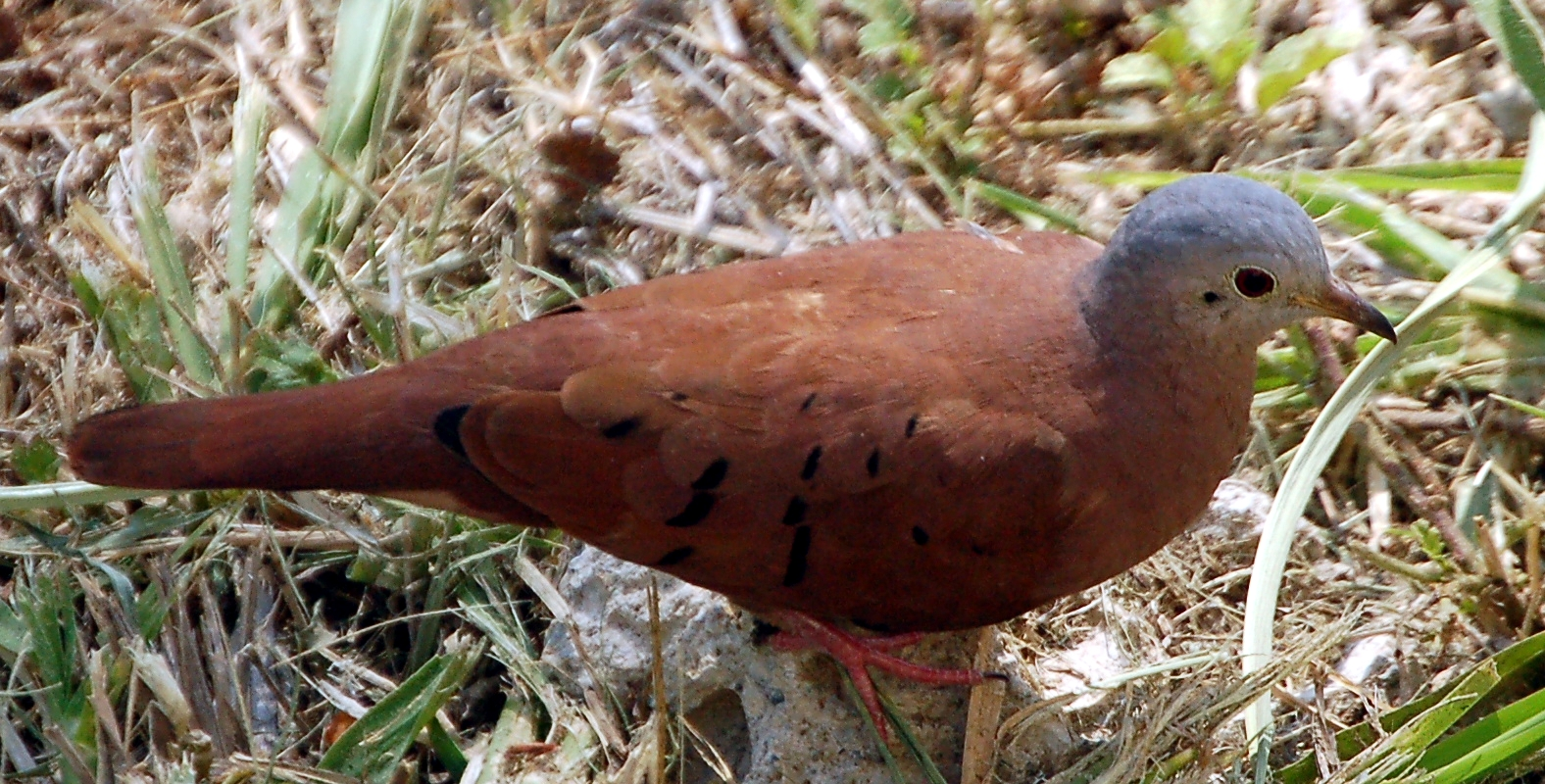
Ruddy ground-dove is very common around human settlements.

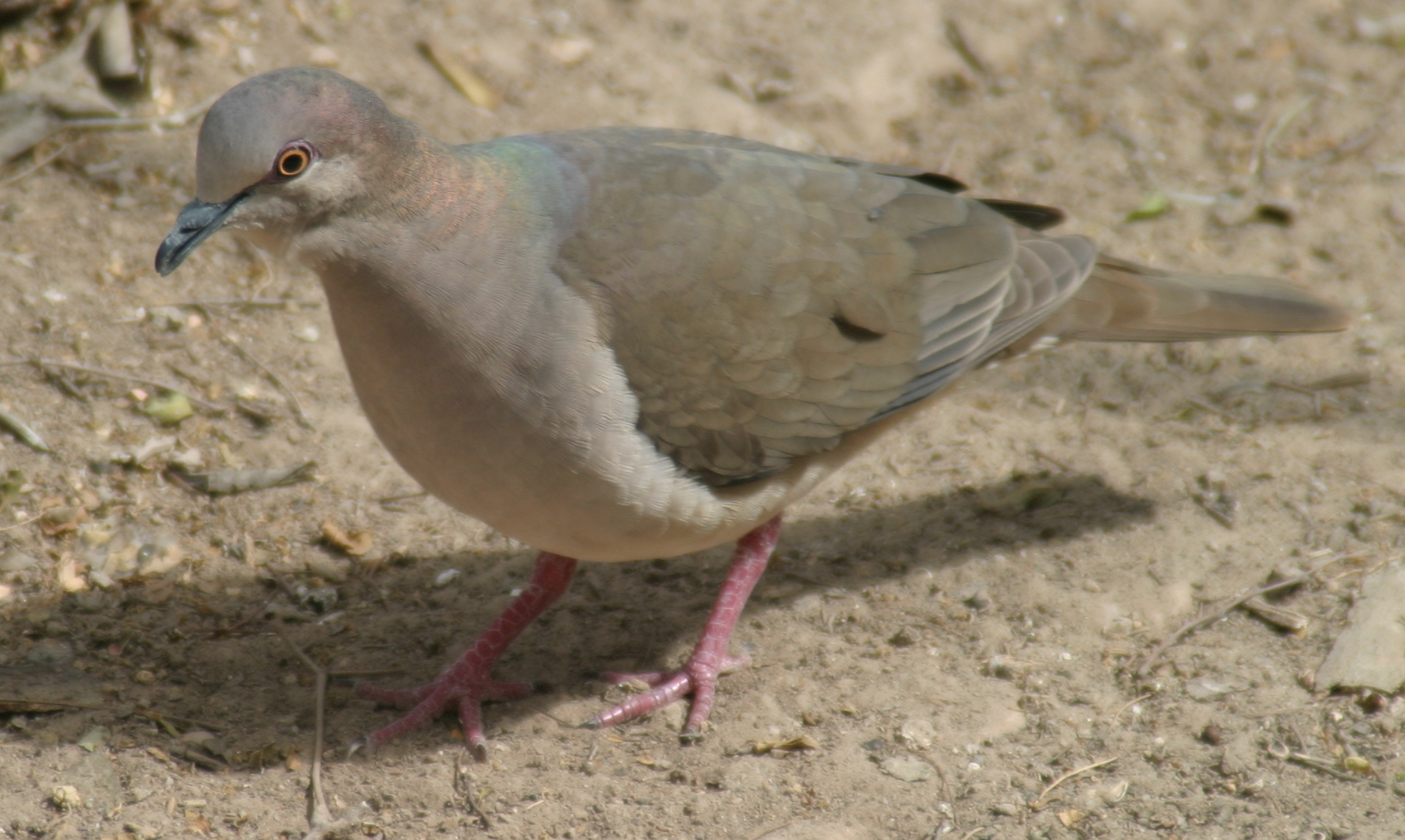
White-tipped dove, a common resident.

Order: Columbiformes Family: Columbidae

Pigeons and doves are stout-bodied birds with short necks and short slender bills with a fleshy cere.

- Rock pigeon, Columba livia (I)
- Pale-vented pigeon, Patagioenas cayennensis
- Scaled pigeon, Patagioenas speciosa
- White-crowned pigeon, Patagioenas leucocephala (near-threatened)
- Red-billed pigeon, Patagioenas flavirostris (A)
- Band-tailed pigeon, Patagioenas fasciata
- Plumbeous pigeon, Patagioenas plumbea
- Ruddy pigeon, Patagioenas subvinacea
- Short-billed pigeon, Patagioenas nigrirostris
- Dusky pigeon, Patagioenas goodsoni (A)
- Eurasian collared-dove, Streptopelia decaocto (I) (A)
- Inca dove, Columbina inca (A)
- Common ground dove, Columbina passerina
- Plain-breasted ground dove, Columbina minuta
- Ruddy ground dove, Columbina talpacoti
- Blue ground dove, Claravis pretiosa
- Maroon-chested ground dove, Paraclaravis mondetoura
- Ruddy quail-dove, Geotrygon montana
- Violaceous quail-dove, Geotrygon violacea
- Olive-backed quail-dove, Leptotrygon veraguensis
- White-tipped dove, Leptotila verreauxi
- Gray-chested dove, Leptotila cassinii
- Gray-headed dove, Leptotila plumbeiceps
- Buff-fronted quail-dove, Zentrygon costaricensis
- Purplish-backed quail-dove, Zentrygon lawrencii
- Chiriqui quail-dove, Zentrygon chiriquensis
- Russet-crowned quail-dove, Zentrygon goldmani (near-threatened)
- White-winged dove, Zenaida asiatica
- Eared dove, Zenaida auriculata (A)
- Mourning dove, Zenaida macroura

== Cuckoos ==
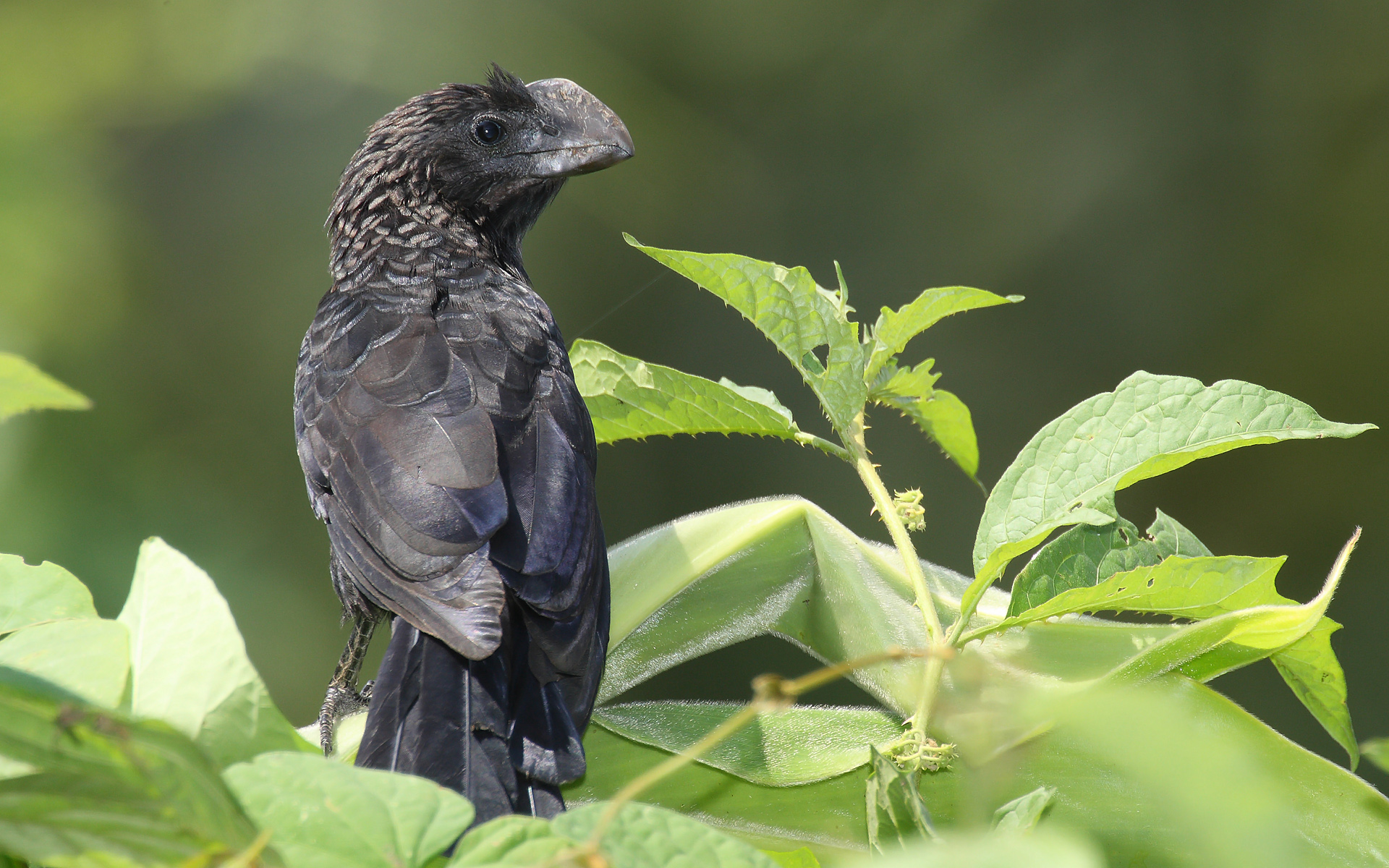
Smooth-billed ani, Darién. Common in open areas.

Order: Cuculiformes Family: Cuculidae

The family Cuculidae includes cuckoos, roadrunners, and anis. These birds are of variable size with slender bodies, long tails, and strong legs. The Old World cuckoos are brood parasites.

- Greater ani, Crotophaga major
- Smooth-billed ani, Crotophaga ani
- Groove-billed ani, Crotophaga sulcirostris
- Striped cuckoo, Tapera naevia
- Pheasant cuckoo, Dromococcyx phasianellus
- Rufous-vented ground-cuckoo, Neomorphus geoffroyi
- Little cuckoo, Coccycua minuta
- Dwarf cuckoo, Coccycua pumila (A)
- Squirrel cuckoo, Piaya cayana
- Dark-billed cuckoo, Coccyzus melacoryphus (A)
- Yellow-billed cuckoo, Coccyzus americanus
- Pearly-breasted cuckoo, Coccyzus euleri
- Mangrove cuckoo, Coccyzus minor
- Black-billed cuckoo, Coccyzus erythropthalmus
- Gray-capped cuckoo, Coccyzus lansbergi (A)

== Nightjars and allies ==
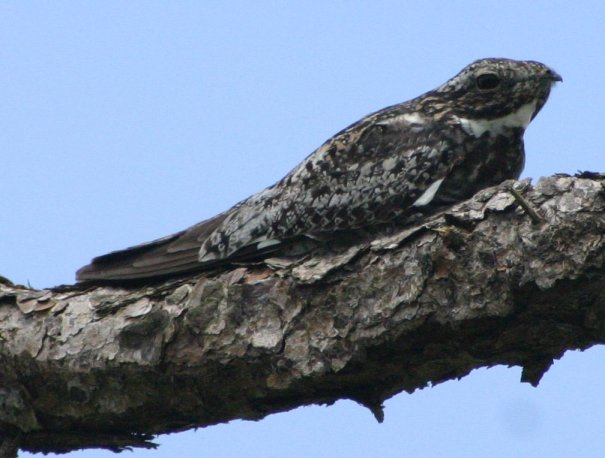
Common nighthawk is present late March to early November. Both breeding and transient races occur.

Order: Caprimulgiformes Family: Caprimulgidae

Nightjars are medium-sized nocturnal birds that usually nest on the ground. They have long wings, short legs, and very short bills. Most have small feet, of little use for walking, and long pointed wings. Their soft plumage is camouflaged to resemble bark or leaves.

- Short-tailed nighthawk, Lurocalis semitorquatus
- Lesser nighthawk, Chordeiles acutipennis
- Common nighthawk, Chordeiles minor
- Common pauraque, Nyctidromus albicollis
- Ocellated poorwill, Nyctiphrynus ocellatus (A)
- Chuck-will's-widow, Antrostomus carolinensis (near-threatened)
- Rufous nightjar, Antrostomus rufus
- Eastern whip-poor-will, Antrostomus vociferus (A) (near-threatened)
- Dusky nightjar, Antrostomus saturatus
- White-tailed nightjar, Hydropsalis cayennensis

== Oilbird ==
Order: Steatornithiformes Family: Steatornithidae

The oilbird is a slim, long-winged bird distantly related to the nightjars. It is nocturnal and a specialist feeder on the fruit of the oil palm.

- Oilbird, Steatornis caripensis (A)

== Potoos ==
Order: Nyctibiiformes Family: Nyctibiidae

The potoos (sometimes called poor-me-ones) are large near passerine birds related to the nightjars and frogmouths. They are nocturnal insectivores which lack the bristles around the mouth found in the true nightjars.

- Great potoo, Nyctibius grandis
- Common potoo, Nyctibius griseus

== Swifts ==
Order: Apodiformes Family: Apodidae

Swifts are small birds which spend the majority of their lives flying. These birds have very short legs and never settle voluntarily on the ground, perching instead only on vertical surfaces. Many swifts have long swept-back wings which resemble a crescent or boomerang.

- Black swift, Cypseloides niger (A) (vulnerable)
- White-chinned swift, Cypseloides cryptus (A)
- Spot-fronted swift, Cypseloides cherriei (A) (population data deficient)
- Chestnut-collared swift, Streptoprocne rutila
- White-collared swift, Streptoprocne zonaris
- Gray-rumped swift, Chaetura cinereiventris
- Band-rumped swift, Chaetura spinicaudus
- Costa Rican swift, Chaetura fumosa (A)
- Chimney swift, Chaetura pelagica (vulnerable)
- Vaux's swift, Chaetura vauxi
- Chapman's swift, Chaetura chapmani (A)
- Sick's swift, Chaetura meridionalis (A)
- Short-tailed swift, Chaetura brachyura
- Lesser swallow-tailed swift, Panyptila cayennensis

== Hummingbirds ==
Order: Apodiformes Family: Trochilidae

Hummingbirds are small birds capable of hovering in mid-air due to the rapid flapping of their wings. They are the only birds that can fly backwards.

- White-necked jacobin, Florisuga mellivora
- White-tipped sicklebill, Eutoxeres aquila
- Bronzy hermit, Glaucis aeneus
- Rufous-breasted hermit, Glaucis hirsutus
- Band-tailed barbthroat, Threnetes ruckeri
- White-whiskered hermit, Phaethornis yaruqui (A) (not on the AOS Check-list)
- Green hermit, Phaethornis guy
- Long-billed hermit, Phaethornis longirostris
- Pale-bellied hermit, Phaethornis anthophilus
- Stripe-throated hermit, Phaethornis striigularis
- Green-fronted lancebill, Doryfera ludovicae
- Brown violetear, Colibri delphinae
- Lesser violetear, Colibri cyanotus
- Tooth-billed hummingbird, Androdon aequatorialis
- Purple-crowned fairy, Heliothryx barroti
- Ruby-topaz hummingbird, Chrysolampis mosquitus (A)
- Green-breasted mango, Anthracothorax prevostii
- Black-throated mango, Anthracothorax nigricollis
- Veraguan mango, Anthracothorax veraguensis
- Green thorntail, Discosura conversii
- Rufous-crested coquette, Lophornis delattrei
- White-crested coquette, Lophornis adorabilis
- Greenish puffleg, Haplophaedia aureliae
- Green-crowned brilliant, Heliodoxa jacula
- Talamanca hummingbird, Eugenes spectabilis
- Fiery-throated hummingbird, Panterpe insignis
- Long-billed starthroat, Heliomaster longirostris
- Plain-capped starthroat, Heliomaster constantii (A)
- White-bellied mountain-gem, Lampornis hemileucus
- Purple-throated mountain-gem, Lampornis calolaemus
- White-throated mountain-gem, Lampornis castaneoventris
- Magenta-throated woodstar, Philodice bryantae
- Purple-throated woodstar, Philodice mitchellii
- Ruby-throated hummingbird, Archilochus colubris (A)
- Volcano hummingbird, Selasphorus flammula
- Scintillant hummingbird, Selasphorus scintilla
- Glow-throated hummingbird, Selasphorus ardens (E) (endangered)
- Garden emerald, Chlorostilbon assimilis
- Violet-headed hummingbird, Klais guimeti
- Violet sabrewing, Campylopterus hemileucurus
- Bronze-tailed plumeleteer, Chalybura urochrysia
- White-vented plumeleteer, Chalybura buffonii
- Crowned woodnymph, Thalurania colombica
- Snowcap, Microchera albocoronata
- White-tailed emerald, Microchera chionura
- Violet-capped hummingbird, Goldmania violiceps
- Pirre hummingbird, Goldmania bella (near-threatened)
- Stripe-tailed hummingbird, Eupherusa eximia
- Black-bellied hummingbird, Eupherusa nigriventris
- Scaly-breasted hummingbird, Phaeochroa cuvierii
- Snowy-bellied hummingbird, Saucerottia edward
- Rufous-tailed hummingbird, Amazilia tzacatl
- Amazilia hummingbird, Amazilis amazilia (A)
- Sapphire-throated hummingbird, Chrysuronia coeruleogularis
- Humboldt's sapphire, Chrysuronia humboldtii (A)
- Blue-chested hummingbird, Polyerata amabilis
- Charming hummingbird, Polyerata decora
- Blue-throated goldentail, Chlorestes eliciae
- Violet-bellied hummingbird, Chlorestes julie
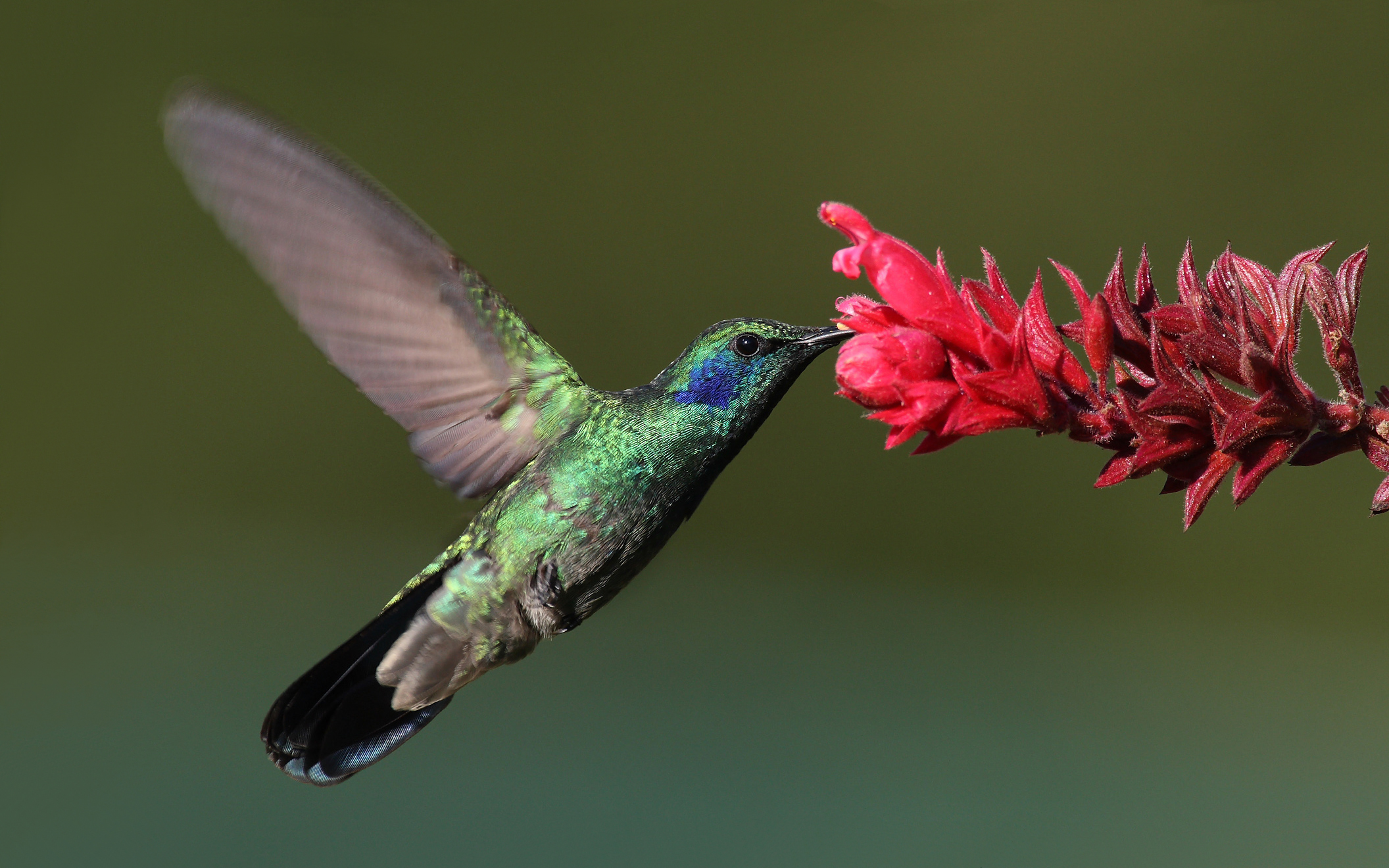
Lesser violetear, Boquete. A noisy bird of the western highlands.

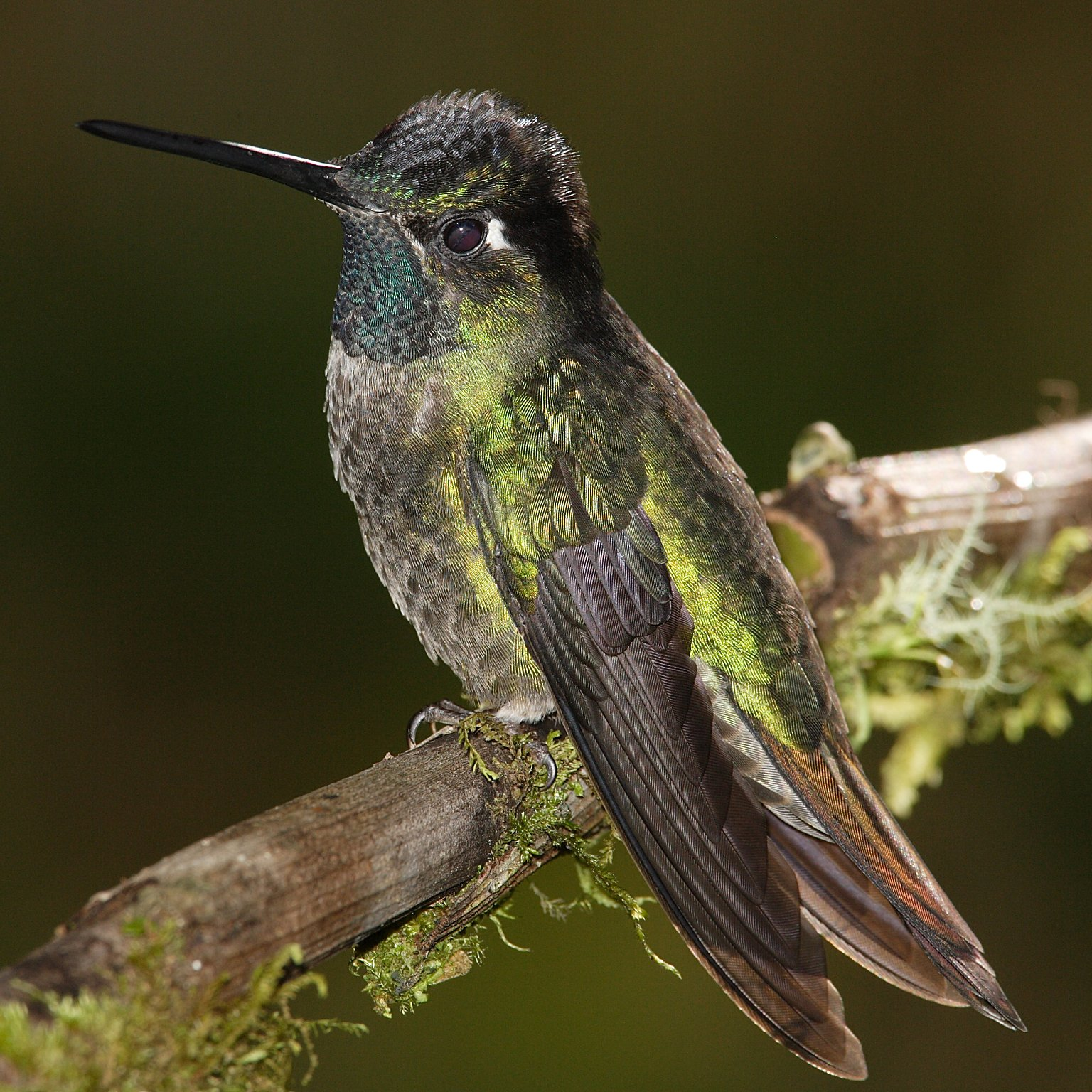
Talamanca hummingbird, Guadalupe. Found at forest edges and clearings around Volcán Barú.

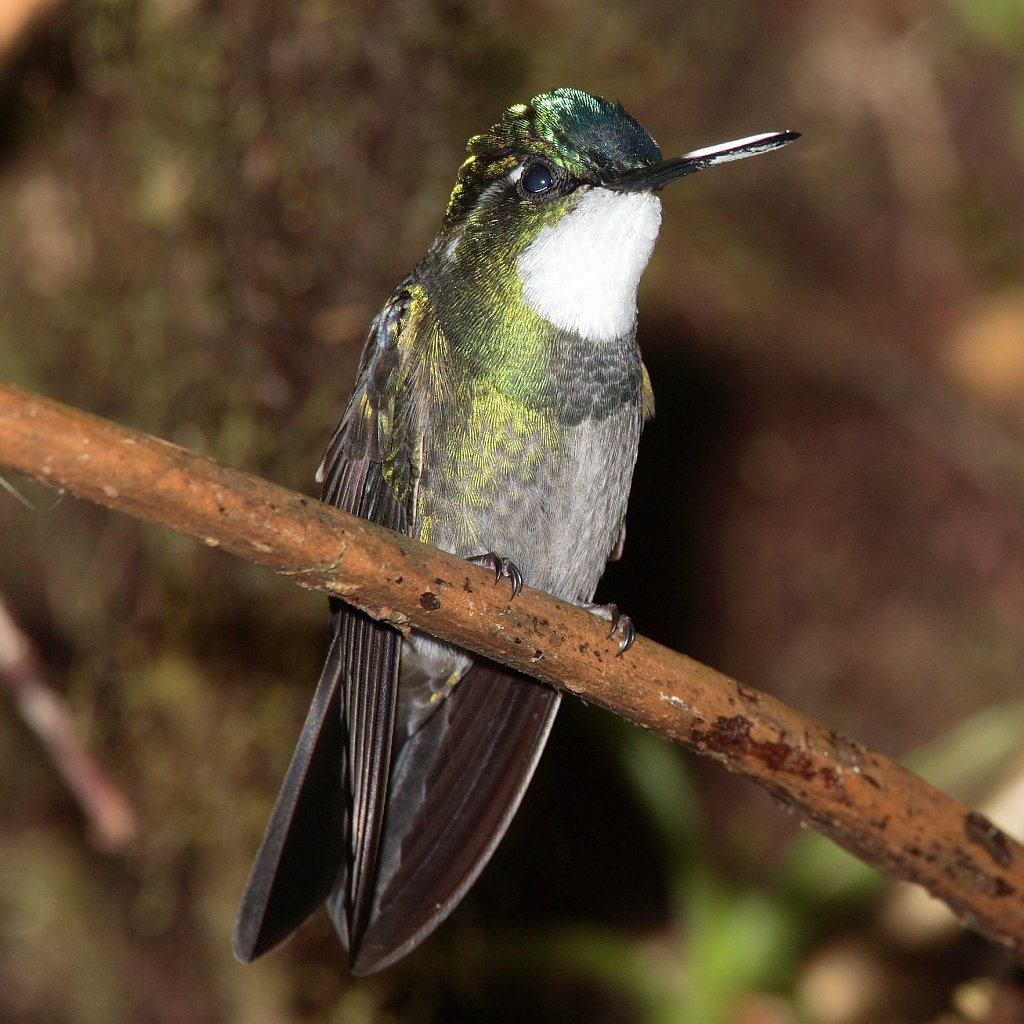
White-throated mountain-gem, Guadalupe. Found only in Costa Rica and western Panama.

== Rails, gallinules, and coots ==
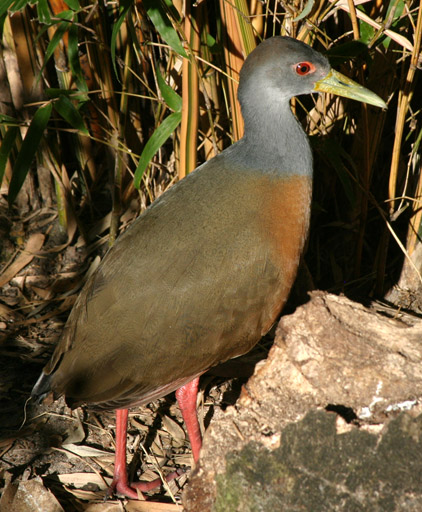
The gray-cowled wood-rail usually keeps to dense cover along forested streams and rivers.

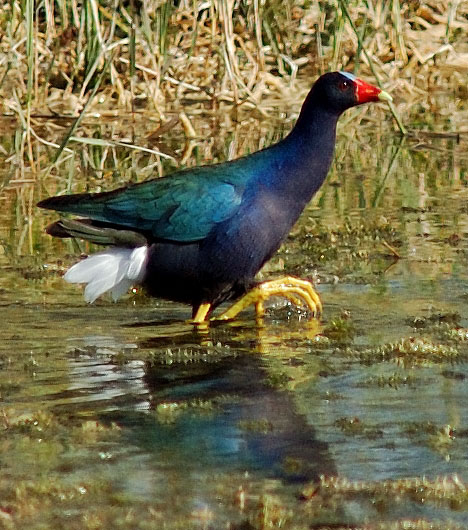
The purple gallinule inhabits well-vegetated wetlands.

Order: Gruiformes Family: Rallidae

Rallidae is a large family of small to medium-sized birds which includes the rails, crakes, coots, and gallinules. Typically they inhabit dense vegetation in damp environments near lakes, swamps, or rivers. In general they are shy and secretive birds, making them difficult to observe. Most species have strong legs and long toes which are well adapted to soft uneven surfaces. They tend to have short, rounded wings and to be weak fliers.

- Colombian crake, Mustelirallus colombianus (A) (population data deficient)
- Paint-billed crake, Mustelirallus erythrops
- Spotted rail, Pardirallus maculatus
- Uniform crake, Amaurolimnas concolor
- Rufous-necked wood-rail, Aramides axillaris (A)
- Gray-cowled wood-rail, Aramides cajaneus
- King rail, Rallus elegans (A) (near-threatened)
- Sora, Porzana carolina
- Common gallinule, Gallinula galeata
- American coot, Fulica americana
- Purple gallinule, Porphyrio martinicus
- Yellow-breasted crake, Hapalocrex flaviventer
- Ruddy crake, Laterallus ruber (A)
- White-throated crake, Laterallus albigularis
- Gray-breasted crake, Laterallus exilis
- Black rail, Laterallus jamaicensis (A)

== Finfoots ==
Order: Gruiformes Family: Heliornithidae

Heliornithidae is a small family of tropical birds with webbed lobes on their feet similar to those of grebes and coots.

- Sungrebe, Heliornis fulica

== Limpkin ==
Order: Gruiformes Family: Aramidae

The limpkin resembles a large rail. It has drab-brown plumage and a grayer head and neck.

- Limpkin, Aramus guarauna

== Thick-knees ==
Order: Charadriiformes Family: Burhinidae

The thick-knees are a group of largely tropical waders in the family Burhinidae. They are found worldwide within the tropical zone, with some species also breeding in temperate Europe and Australia. They are medium to large waders with strong black or yellow-black bills, large yellow eyes, and cryptic plumage. Despite being classed as waders, most species have a preference for arid or semi-arid habitats.

- Double-striped thick-knee, Burhinus bistriatus (A)

== Stilts and avocets ==
Order: Charadriiformes Family: Recurvirostridae

Recurvirostridae is a family of large wading birds which includes the avocets and stilts. The avocets have long legs and long up-curved bills. The stilts have extremely long legs and long, thin, straight bills.

- Black-necked stilt, Himantopus mexicanus
- American avocet, Recurvirostra americana (A)

== Oystercatchers ==
Order: Charadriiformes Family: Haematopodidae

The oystercatchers are large and noisy plover-like birds, with strong bills used for smashing or prising open molluscs.

- American oystercatcher, Haematopus palliatus

== Plovers and lapwings ==
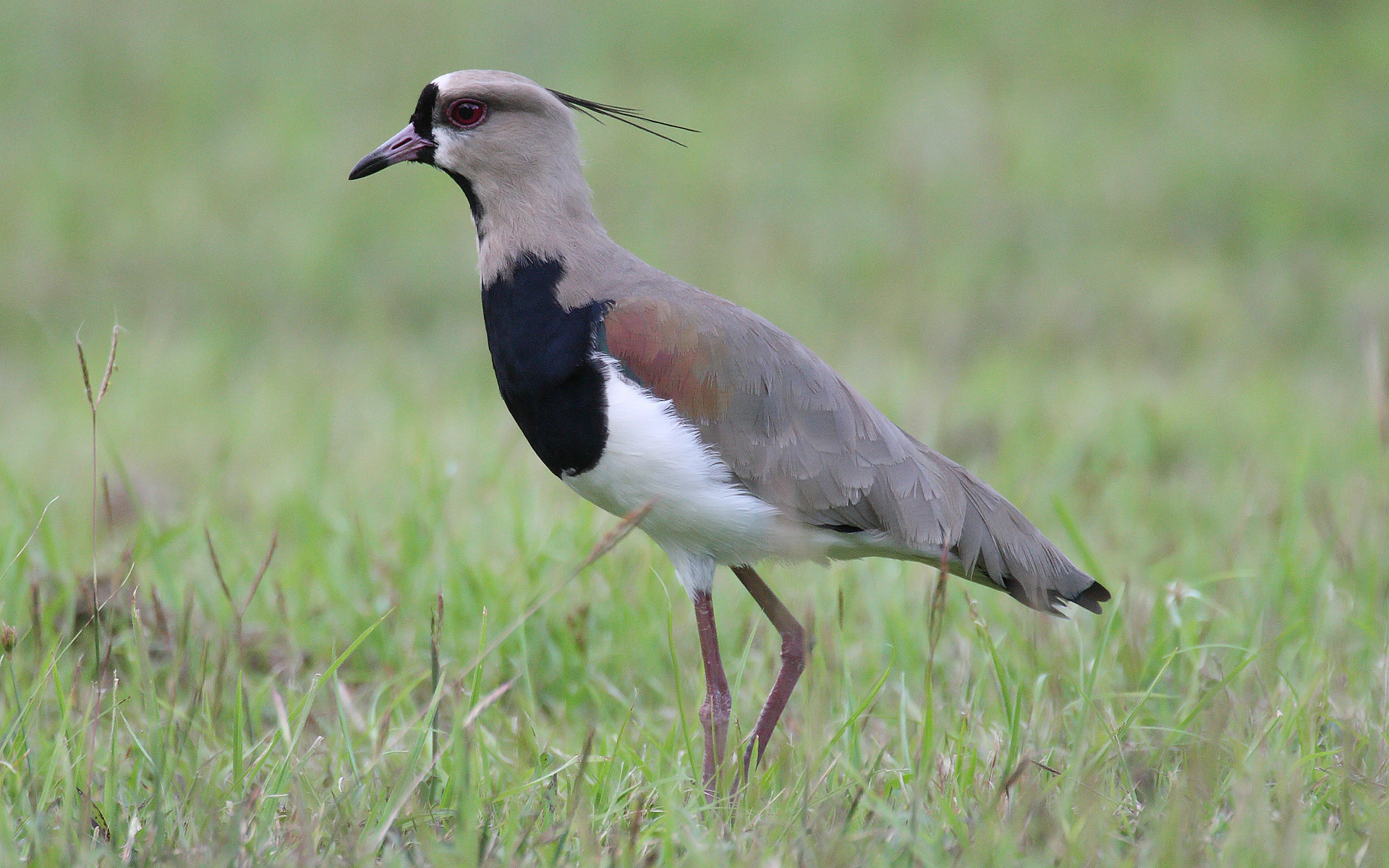
Southern lapwing, Gamboa. It has increased and spread westwards in recent decades.

Order: Charadriiformes Family: Charadriidae

The family Charadriidae includes the plovers, dotterels, and lapwings. They are small to medium-sized birds with compact bodies, short, thick necks, and long, usually pointed, wings. They are found in open country worldwide, mostly in habitats near water.

- Southern lapwing, Vanellus chilensis
- Black-bellied plover, Pluvialis squatarola
- American golden-plover, Pluvialis dominica
- Killdeer, Charadrius vociferus
- Semipalmated plover, Charadrius semipalmatus
- Wilson's plover, Charadrius wilsonia
- Collared plover, Charadrius collaris
- Snowy plover, Charadrius nivosus (A) (near-threatened)

== Jacanas ==
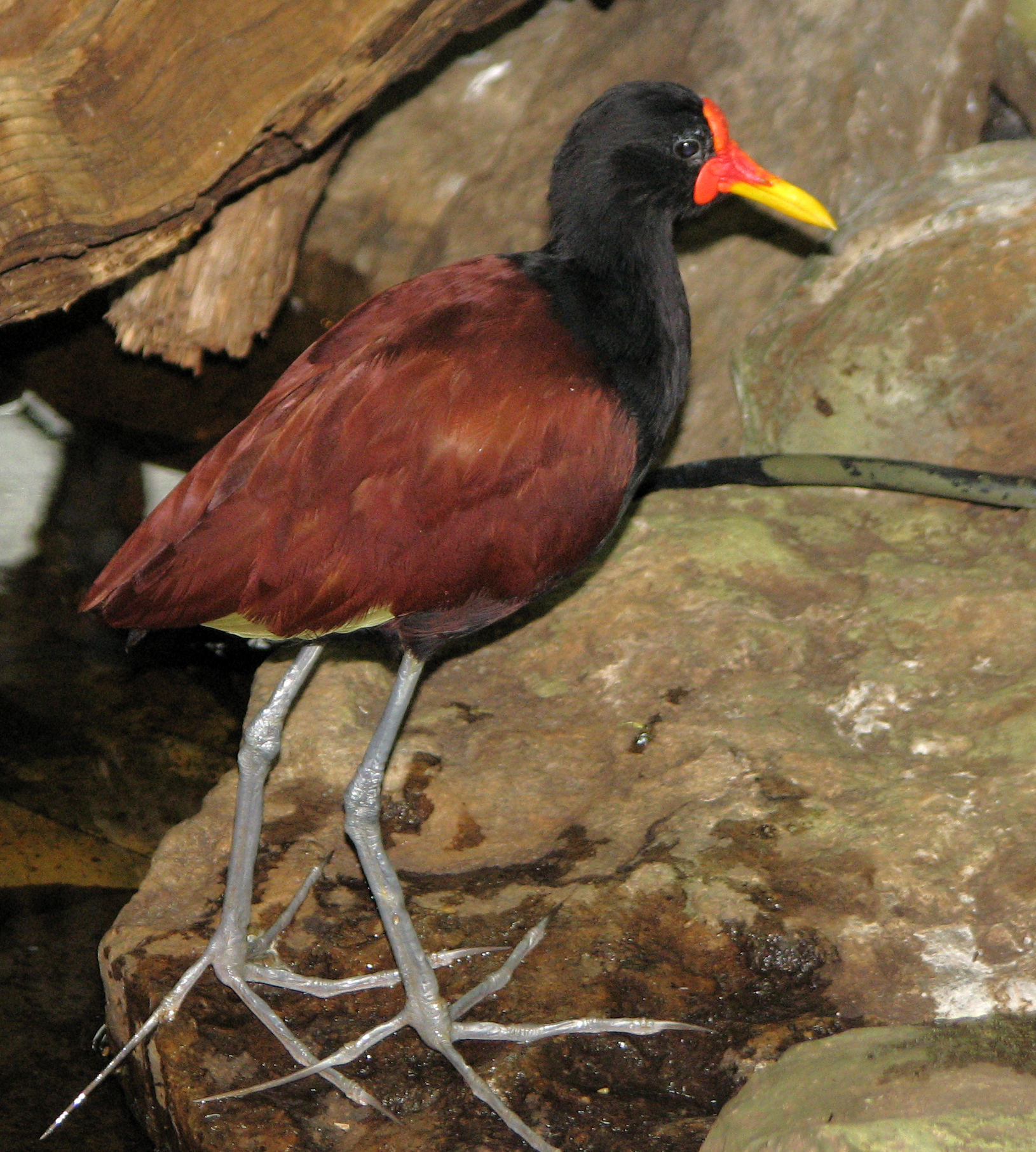
Wattled jacana is common in wetlands with plenty of floating vegetation.

Order: Charadriiformes Family: Jacanidae

The jacanas are a group of waders which are found throughout the tropics. They are identifiable by their huge feet and claws which enable them to walk on floating vegetation in the shallow lakes that are their preferred habitat.

- Northern jacana, Jacana spinosa
- Wattled jacana, Jacana jacana

== Sandpipers and allies ==
Order: Charadriiformes Family: Scolopacidae

Scolopacidae is a large diverse family of small to medium-sized shorebirds including the sandpipers, curlews, godwits, shanks, tattlers, woodcocks, snipes, dowitchers, and phalaropes. The majority of these species eat small invertebrates picked out of the mud or soil. Variation in length of legs and bills enables multiple species to feed in the same habitat, particularly on the coast, without direct competition for food.

- Upland sandpiper, Bartramia longicauda
- Whimbrel, Numenius phaeopus
- Long-billed curlew, Numenius americanus (A)
- Hudsonian godwit, Limosa haemastica (A)
- Marbled godwit, Limosa fedoa
- Ruddy turnstone, Arenaria interpres
- Red knot, Calidris canutus (near-threatened)
- Surfbird, Calidris virgata
- Ruff, Calidris pugnax (A)
- Sharp-tailed sandpiper, Calidris acuminata (A)
- Stilt sandpiper, Calidris himantopus
- Curlew sandpiper, Calidris ferruginea (A) (near-threatened)
- Sanderling, Calidris alba
- Dunlin, Calidris alpina (A)
- Baird's sandpiper, Calidris bairdii
- Least sandpiper, Calidris minutilla
- White-rumped sandpiper, Calidris fuscicollis
- Buff-breasted sandpiper, Calidris subruficollis (near-threatened)
- Pectoral sandpiper, Calidris melanotos
- Semipalmated sandpiper, Calidris pusilla (near-threatened)
- Western sandpiper, Calidris mauri
- Short-billed dowitcher, Limnodromus griseus
- Long-billed dowitcher, Limnodromus scolopaceus
- Wilson's snipe, Gallinago delicata
- Spotted sandpiper, Actitis macularius
- Solitary sandpiper, Tringa solitaria
- Wandering tattler, Tringa incana (A)
- Lesser yellowlegs, Tringa flavipes
- Willet, Tringa semipalmata
- Greater yellowlegs, Tringa melanoleuca
- Wilson's phalarope, Phalaropus tricolor
- Red-necked phalarope, Phalaropus lobatus
- Red phalarope, Phalaropus fulicarius (A)
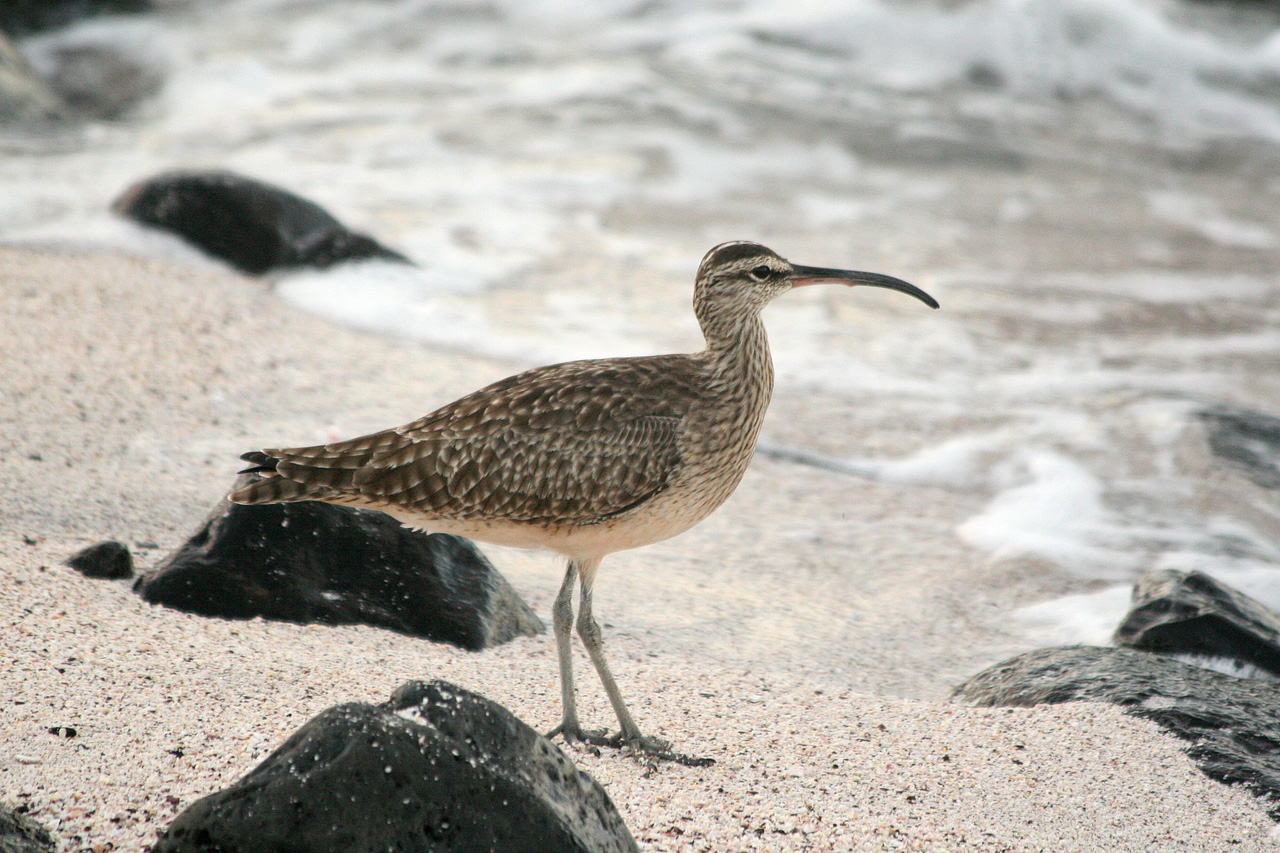
Whimbrel, a common passage migrant and winter visitor.

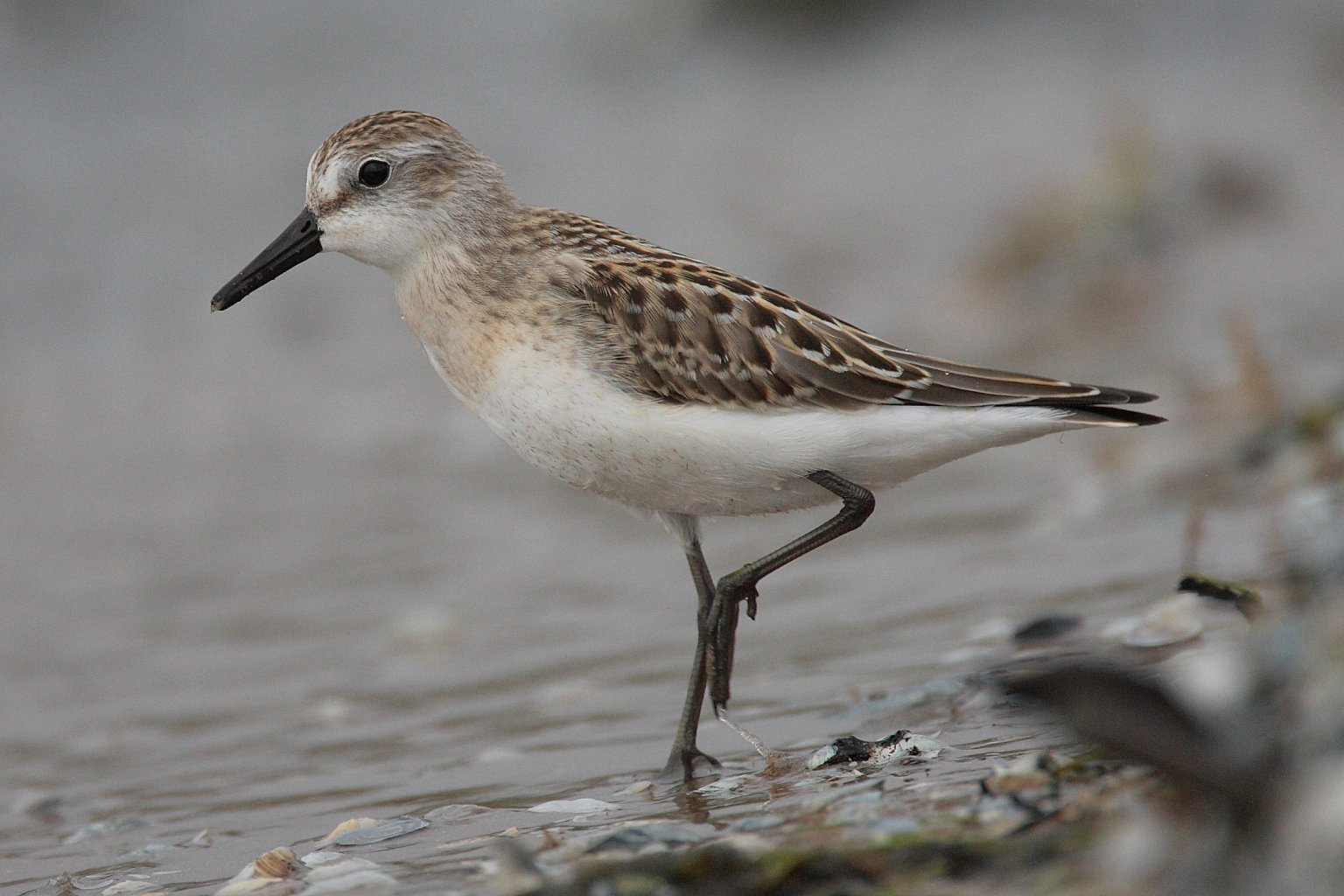
Semipalmated sandpiper occurs in large flocks with western sandpipers.

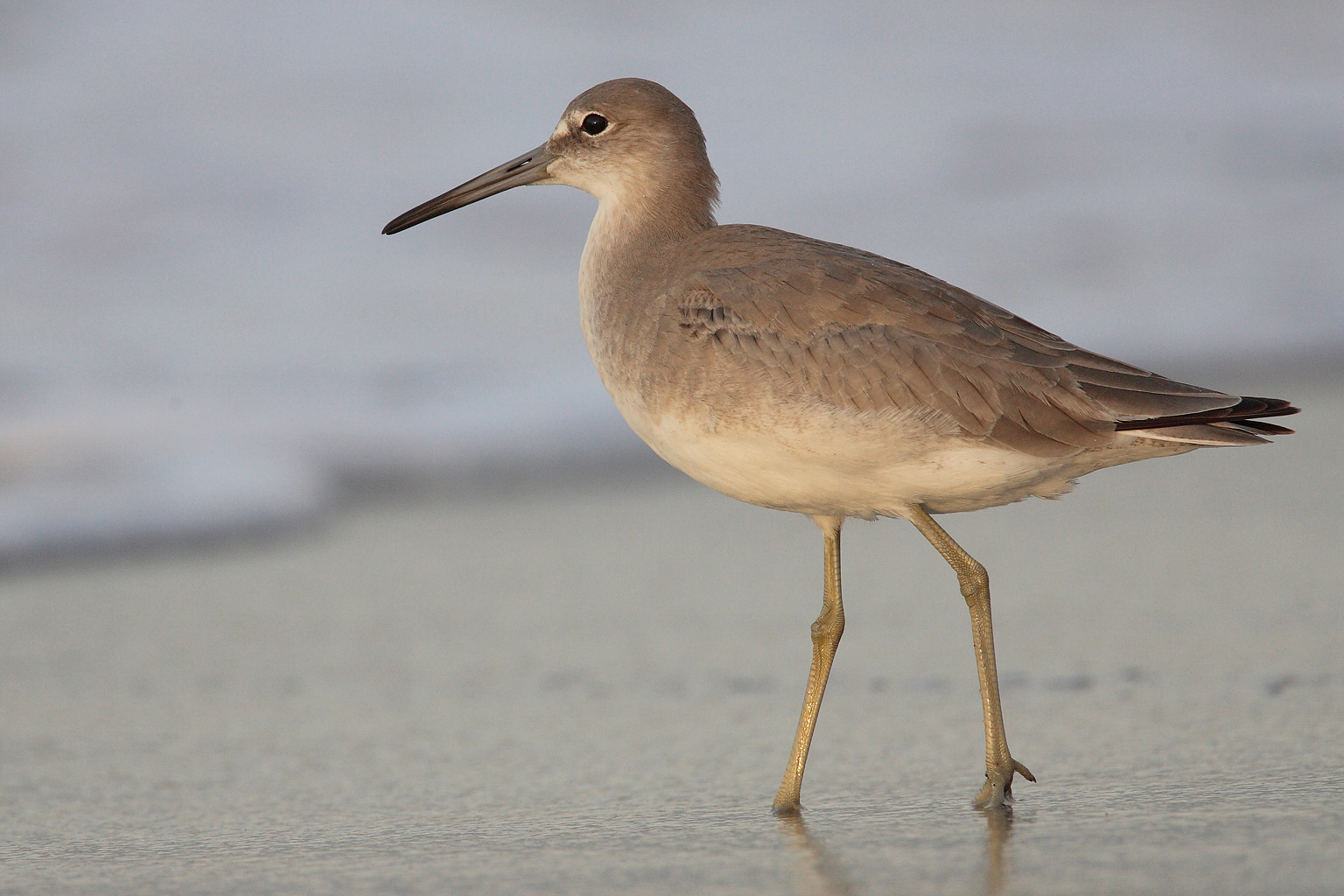
Willet, Farallon. Common along the coasts.

== Skuas and jaegers ==
Order: Charadriiformes Family: Stercorariidae

The family Stercorariidae are, in general, medium to large birds, typically with gray or brown plumage, often with white markings on the wings. They nest on the ground in temperate and arctic regions and are long-distance migrants.

- South polar skua, Stercorarius maccormicki (A)
- Pomarine jaeger, Stercorarius pomarinus
- Parasitic jaeger, Stercorarius parasiticus
- Long-tailed jaeger, Stercorarius longicaudus (A)

== Gulls, terns, and skimmers ==
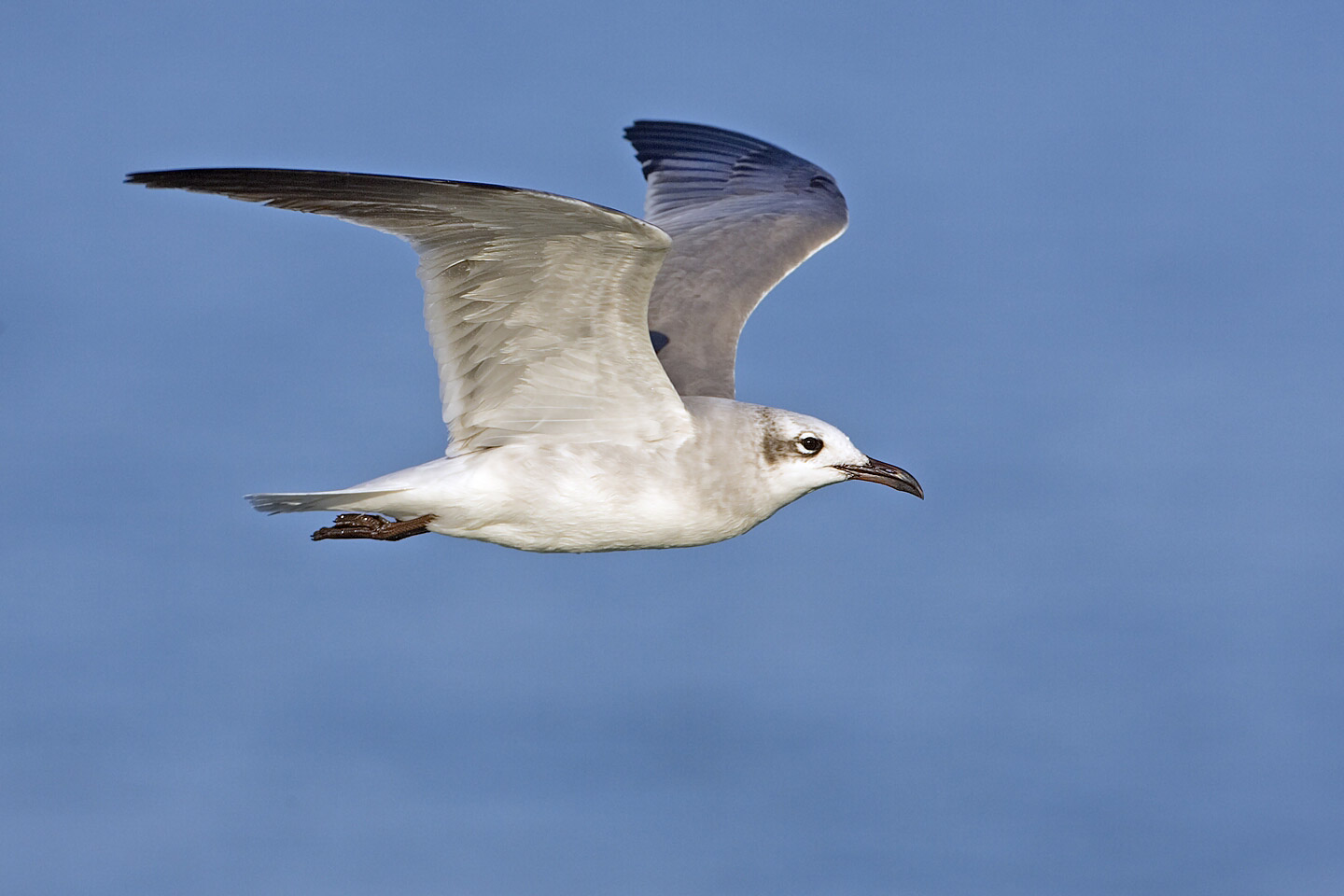
Laughing gull is the most common of Panama's gulls.

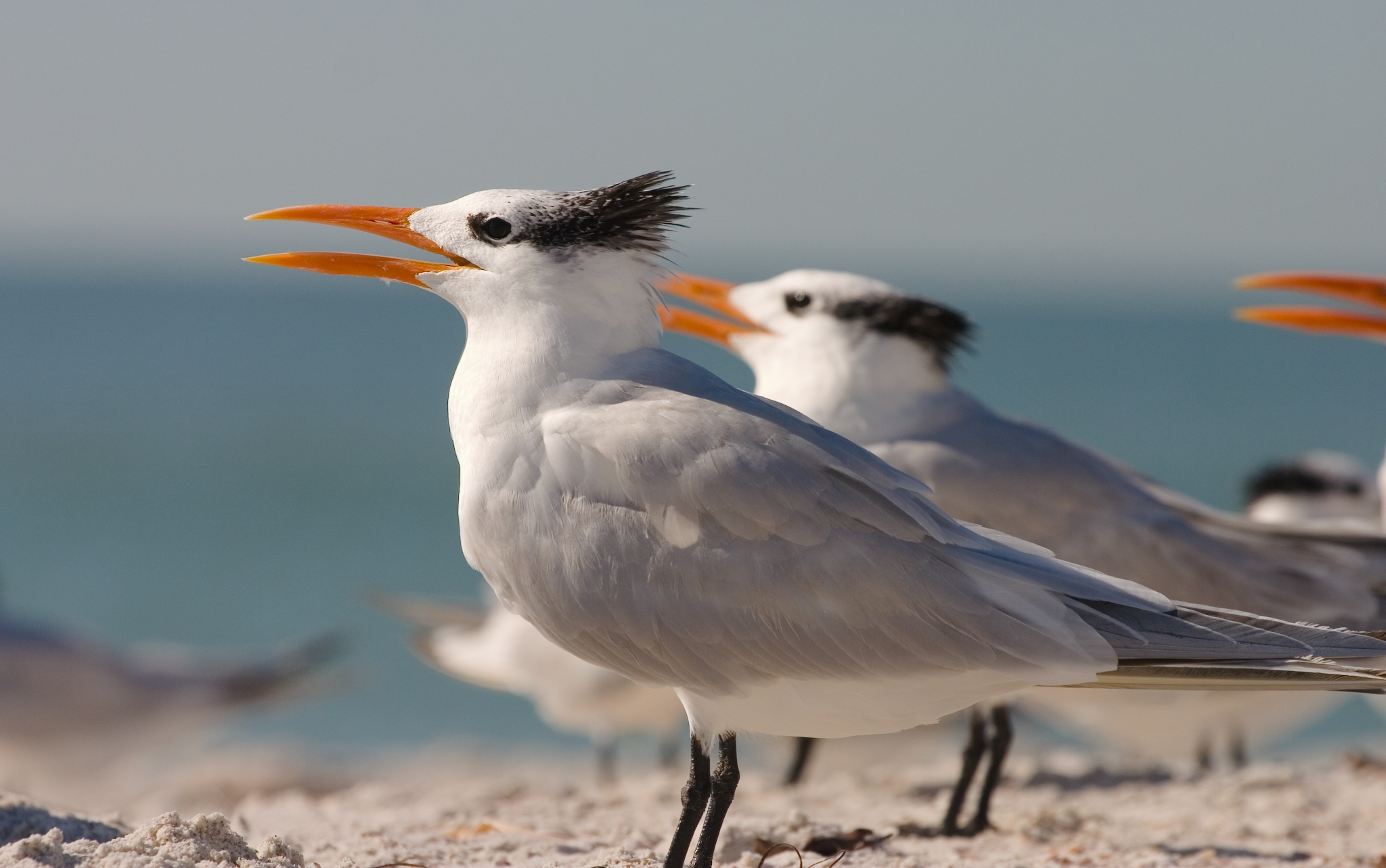
Royal terns are common non-breeding visitors to coasts.

Order: Charadriiformes Family: Laridae

Laridae is a family of medium to large seabirds and includes gulls, kittiwakes, terns, and skimmers. They are typically gray or white, often with black markings on the head or wings. They have longish bills and webbed feet. Terns are a group of generally medium to large seabirds typically with gray or white plumage, often with black markings on the head. Most terns hunt fish by diving but some pick insects off the surface of fresh water. Terns are generally long-lived birds, with several species known to live in excess of 30 years. Skimmers are a small family of tropical tern-like birds. They have an elongated lower mandible which they use to feed by flying low over the water surface and skimming the water for small fish.

- Swallow-tailed gull, Creagrus furcatus (A)
- Black-legged kittiwake, Rissa tridactyla (A)
- Sabine's gull, Xema sabini
- Bonaparte's gull, Chroicocephalus philadelphia (A)
- Gray-hooded gull, Chroicocephalus cirrocephalus (A)
- Gray gull, Leucophaeus modestus (A)
- Laughing gull, Leucophaeus atricilla
- Franklin's gull, Leucophaeus pipixcan
- Belcher's gull, Larus belcheri (A)
- Ring-billed gull, Larus delawarensis
- Western gull, Larus occidentalis (A)
- California gull, Larus californicus (A)
- Herring gull, Larus argentatus
- Lesser black-backed gull, Larus fuscus (A)
- Kelp gull, Larus dominicanus (A)
- Brown noddy, Anous stolidus
- Black noddy, Anous minutus (A)
- White tern, Gygis alba (A)
- Sooty tern, Onychoprion fuscatus
- Bridled tern, Onychoprion anaethetus
- Least tern, Sternula antillarum
- Yellow-billed tern, Sternula superciliaris (A)
- Large-billed tern, Phaetusa simplex (A)
- Gull-billed tern, Gelochelidon nilotica
- Caspian tern, Hydroprogne caspia
- Inca tern, Larosterna inca (A) (near-threatened)
- Black tern, Chlidonias niger
- Common tern, Sterna hirundo
- Arctic tern, Sterna paradisaea (A)
- Forster's tern, Sterna forsteri (A)
- Royal tern, Thalasseus maxima
- Sandwich tern, Thalasseus sandvicensis
- Elegant tern, Thalasseus elegans (near-threatened)
- Black skimmer, Rynchops niger (A)

== Sunbittern ==
Order: Eurypygiformes Family: Eurypygidae

The sunbittern is a bittern-like bird of tropical regions of the Americas and the sole member of the family Eurypygidae (sometimes spelled Eurypigidae) and genus Eurypyga.

- Sunbittern, Eurypyga helias

== Tropicbirds ==
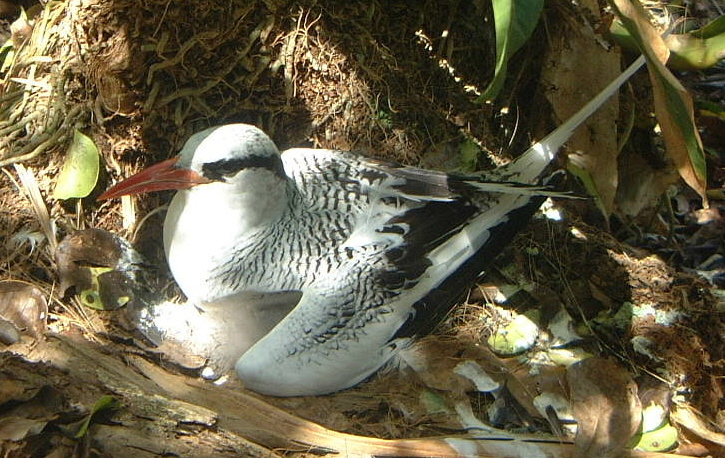
Red-billed tropicbird; a few breed on Swan Cay off the Caribbean coast.

Order: Phaethontiformes Family: Phaethontidae

Tropicbirds are slender white birds of tropical oceans which have exceptionally long central tail feathers. Their heads and long wings have black markings.

- White-tailed tropicbird, Phaethon lepturus (A)
- Red-billed tropicbird, Phaethon aethereus

== Penguins ==
Order: Sphenisciformes Family: Spheniscidae

The penguins are a group of aquatic, flightless birds living almost exclusively in the Southern Hemisphere. Most penguins feed on krill, fish, squid, and other forms of sealife caught while swimming underwater.

- Galapagos penguin, Spheniscus mendiculus (A)

== Albatrosses ==
Order: Procellariiformes Family: Diomedeidae

The albatrosses are among the largest of flying birds, and the great albatrosses from the genus Diomedea have the largest wingspans of any extant birds.

- Yellow-nosed albatross, Thalassarche chlororhynchos (A)
- Gray-headed albatross, Thalassarche chrysostoma (A) (endangered)
- Black-browed albatross, Thalassarche melanophris (A)
- Wandering albatross, Diomedea exulans (A)
- Waved albatross, Phoebastria irrorata (A) (critically endangered)

== Southern storm-petrels ==
Order: Procellariiformes Family: Oceanitidae

The storm-petrels are the smallest seabirds, relatives of the petrels, feeding on planktonic crustaceans and small fish picked from the surface, typically while hovering. The flight is fluttering and sometimes bat-like. Until 2018, this family's three species were included with the other storm-petrels in family Hydrobatidae.

- Wilson's storm-petrel, Oceanites oceanicus (A)
- Elliot's storm-petrel, Oceanites gracilis (A)

== Northern storm-petrels ==
Order: Procellariiformes Family: Hydrobatidae

Though the members of this family are similar in many respects to the southern storm-petrels, including their general appearance and habits, there are enough genetic differences to warrant their placement in a separate family.

- Leach's storm-petrel, Hydrobates leucorhous (A) (vulnerable)
- Band-rumped storm-petrel, Hydrobates castro (A)
- Wedge-rumped storm-petrel, Hydrobates tethys
- Black storm-petrel, Hydrobates melania
- Markham's storm-petrel, Hydrobates markhami (A) (near-threatened)
- Least storm-petrel, Hydrobates microsoma

== Shearwaters and petrels ==
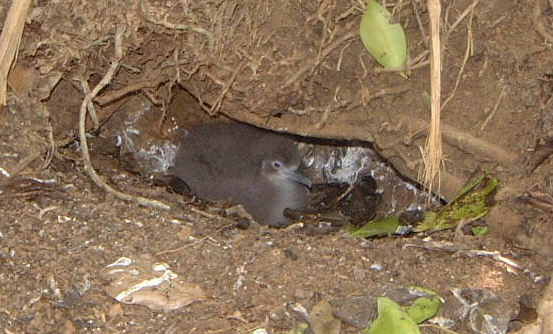
Sargasso shearwater chick; this species breeds on Tiger Cays off the Caribbean coast.

Order: Procellariiformes Family: Procellariidae

The procellariids are the main group of medium-sized "true petrels", characterized by united nostrils with medium septum and a long outer functional primary.

- Black-capped petrel, Pterodroma hasitata (A)
- Galapagos petrel, Pterodroma phaeopygia (A) (critically endangered)
- Tahiti petrel, Pseudobulweria rostrata (A) (near-threatened)
- Parkinson's petrel, Procellaria parkinsoni (vulnerable)
- Cory's shearwater, Calonectris diomedea (A)
- Wedge-tailed shearwater, Ardenna pacificus (A)
- Sooty shearwater, Ardenna griseus (near-threatened)
- Pink-footed shearwater, Ardenna creatopus (A)
- Christmas shearwater, Puffinus navitatis (A)
- Galapagos shearwater, Puffinus subalaris
- Manx shearwater, Puffinus puffinus (A)
- Townsend's shearwater, Puffinus auricularis (A) (critically endangered)
- Newell's shearwater, Puffinus newelli (A) (critically endangered)
- Sargasso shearwater, Puffinus lherminieri
- Barolo shearwater, Puffinus baroli (A)

== Storks ==
Order: Ciconiiformes Family: Ciconiidae

Storks are large, long-legged, long-necked wading birds with long stout bills. Storks are mute, but bill-clattering is an important mode of communication at the nest. Their nests can be large and may be reused for many years. Many species are migratory.

- Maguari stork, Ciconia maguari (A)
- Jabiru, Jabiru mycteria (A)
- Wood stork, Mycteria americana

== Frigatebirds ==
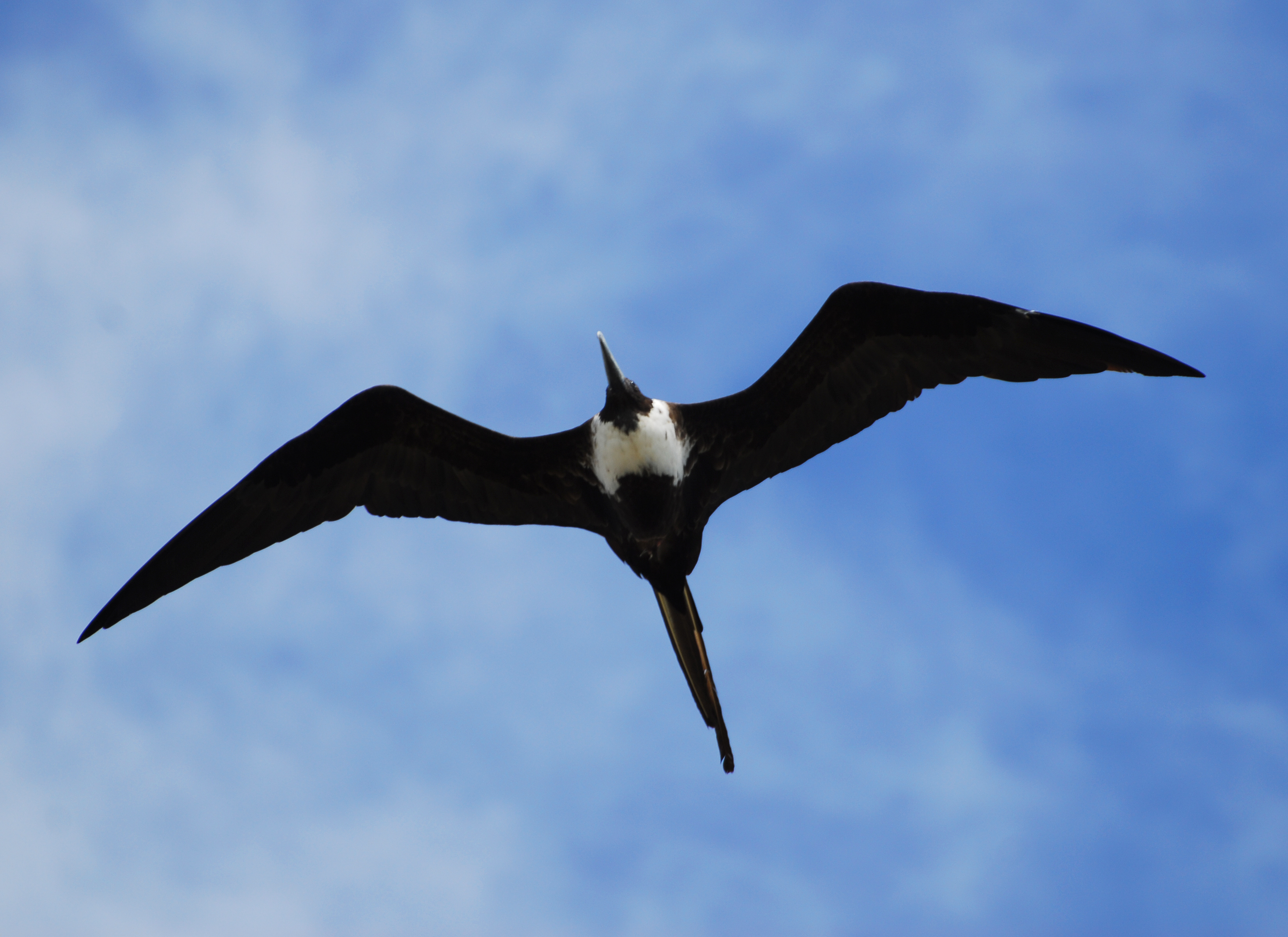
Magnificent frigatebird, frequently seen soaring over coastal areas.

Order: Suliformes Family: Fregatidae

Frigatebirds are large seabirds usually found over tropical oceans. They are large, black-and-white, or completely black, with long wings and deeply forked tails. The males have colored inflatable throat pouches. They do not swim or walk and cannot take off from a flat surface. Having the largest wingspan-to-body-weight ratio of any bird, they are essentially aerial, able to stay aloft for more than a week.

- Magnificent frigatebird, Fregata magnificens
- Great frigatebird, Fregata minor (A)

== Boobies and gannets ==
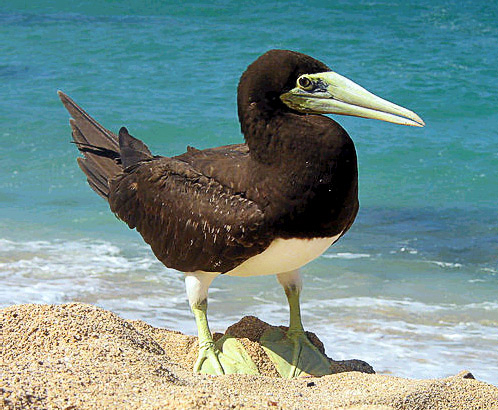
Brown booby, the commonest of the boobies along Panama's coasts.

Order: Suliformes Family: Sulidae

The sulids comprise the gannets and boobies. Both groups are medium to large coastal seabirds that plunge-dive for fish.

- Masked booby, Sula dactylatra
- Nazca booby, Sula granti (A)
- Blue-footed booby, Sula nebouxii
- Peruvian booby, Sula variegata
- Brown booby, Sula leucogaster
- Red-footed booby, Sula sula

== Anhingas ==
Order: Suliformes Family: Anhingidae

Anhingas are often called "snake-birds" because of their long thin neck, which gives a snake-like appearance when they swim with their bodies submerged. The males have black and dark-brown plumage, an erectile crest on the nape, and a larger bill than the female. The females have much paler plumage especially on the neck and underparts. The anhingas have completely webbed feet and their legs are short and set far back on the body. Their plumage is somewhat permeable, like that of cormorants, and they spread their wings to dry after diving.

- Anhinga, Anhinga anhinga

== Cormorants and shags ==
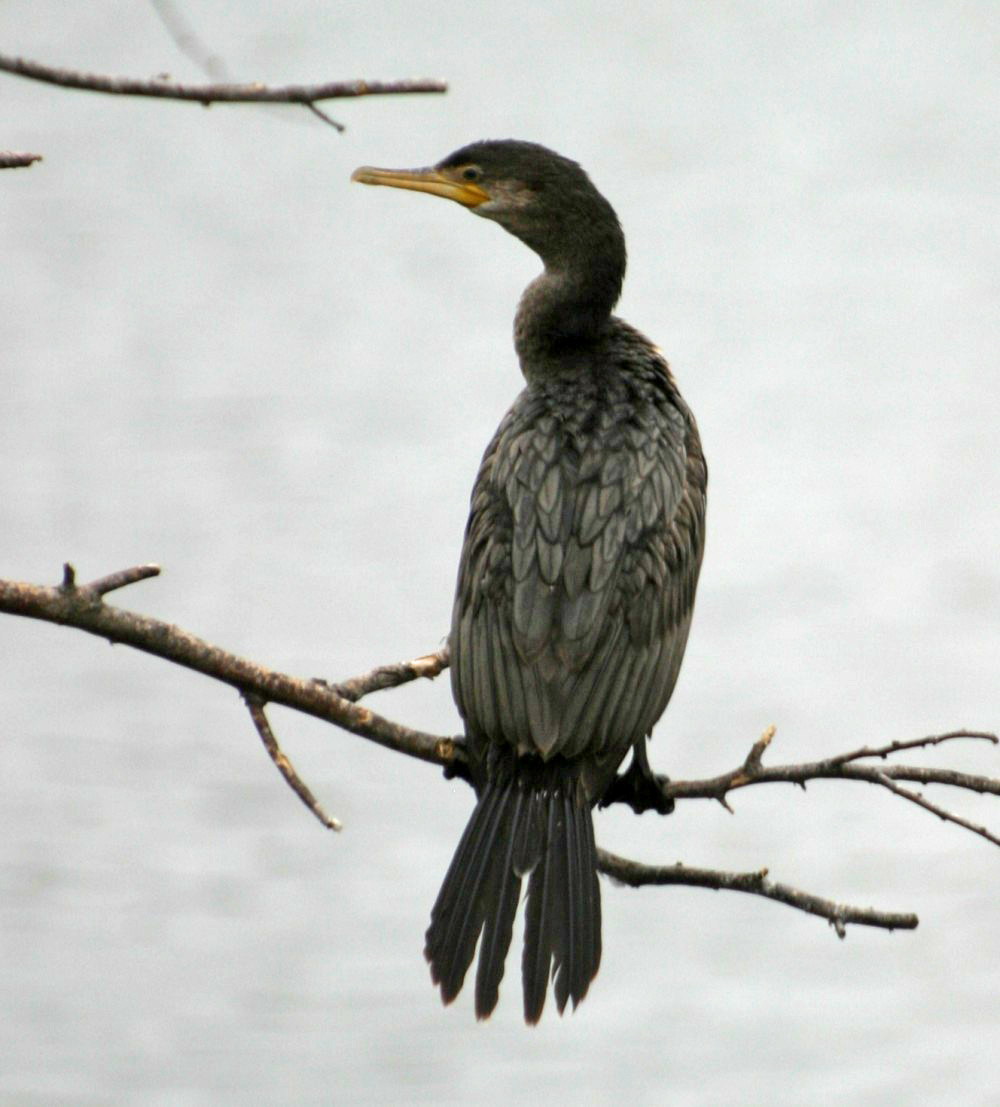
Neotropic cormorant, which can occur in huge numbers in Panama Bay.

Order: Suliformes Family: Phalacrocoracidae

Phalacrocoracidae is a family of medium to large coastal, fish-eating seabirds that includes cormorants and shags. Plumage coloration varies, with the majority having mainly dark plumage, some species being black-and-white, and a few being colorful.

- Neotropic cormorant, Nannopterum brasilianum
- Guanay cormorant, Leucocarbo bougainvillii (A)

== Pelicans ==
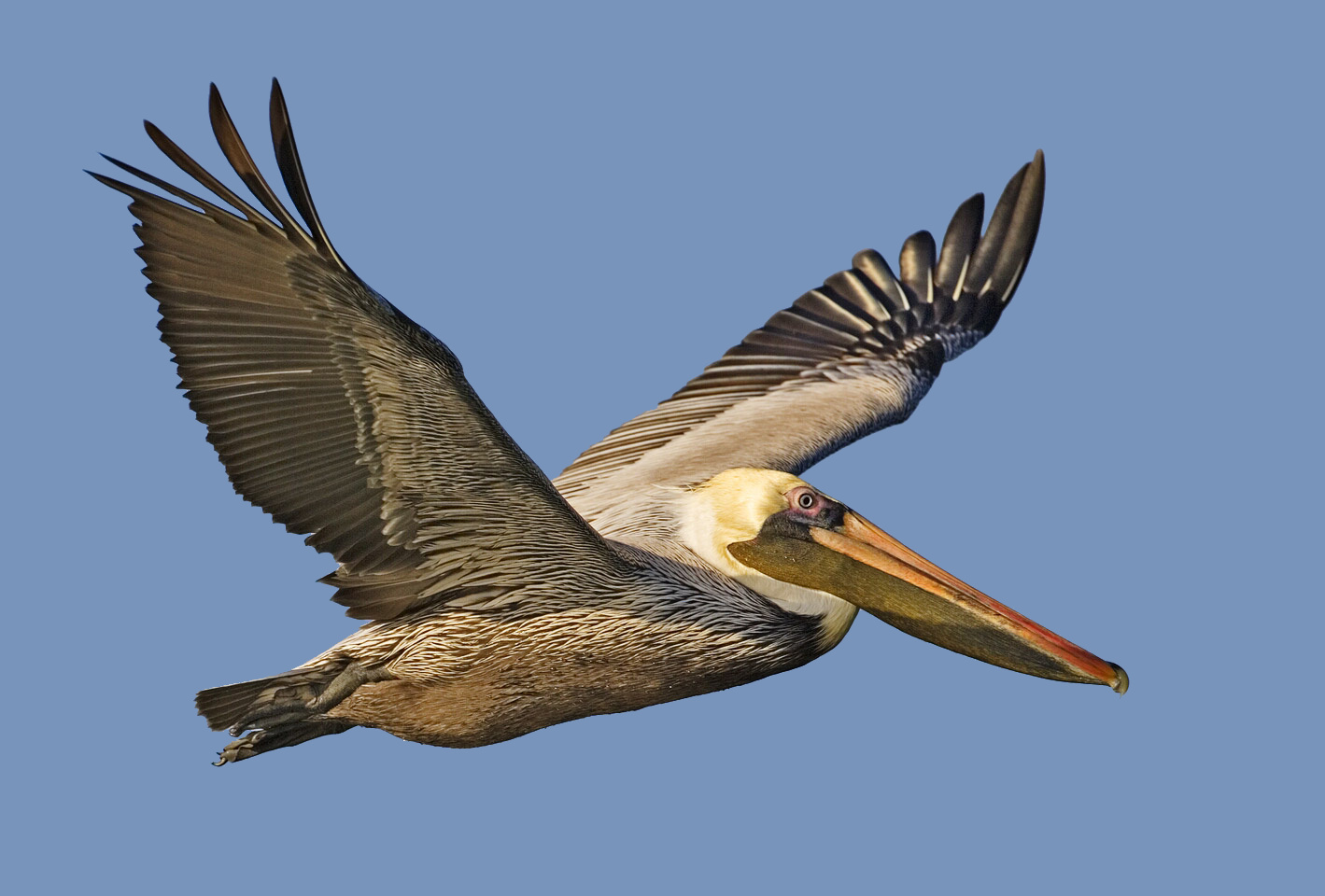
Brown pelican, very common along the coast.

Order: Pelecaniformes Family: Pelecanidae

Pelicans are large water birds with a distinctive pouch under their beak. As with other members of the order Pelecaniformes, they have webbed feet with four toes.

- American white pelican, Pelecanus erythrorhynchos (A)
- Brown pelican, Pelecanus occidentalis

== Herons, egrets, and bitterns ==
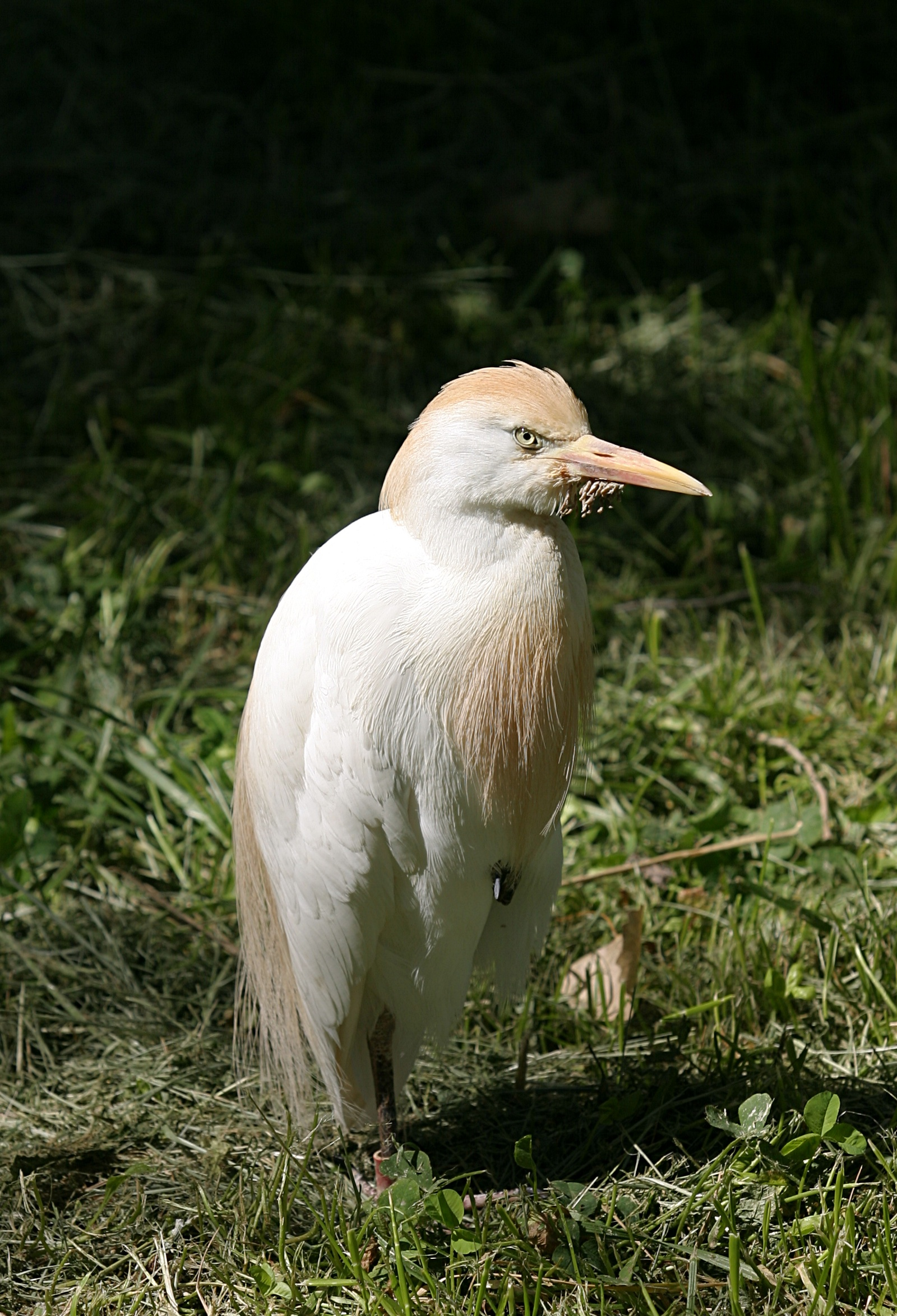
Cattle egret, first recorded in 1954 and now common.

Order: Pelecaniformes Family: Ardeidae

The family Ardeidae contains the bitterns, herons, and egrets. Herons and egrets are medium to large wading birds with long necks and legs. Bitterns tend to be shorter-necked and more wary. Members of Ardeidae fly with their necks retracted, unlike other long-necked birds such as storks, ibises, and spoonbills.

- Pinnated bittern, Botaurus pinnatus (A)
- American bittern, Botaurus lentiginosus (A)
- Least bittern, Ixobrychus exilis
- Rufescent tiger-heron, Tigrisoma lineatum
- Fasciated tiger-heron, Tigrisoma fasciatum
- Bare-throated tiger-heron, Tigrisoma mexicanum
- Great blue heron, Ardea herodias
- Cocoi heron, Ardea cocoi
- Great egret, Ardea alba
- Whistling heron, Syrigma sibilatrix (A)
- Snowy egret, Egretta thula
- Little blue heron, Egretta caerulea
- Tricolored heron, Egretta tricolor
- Reddish egret, Egretta rufescens (A) (near-threatened)
- Cattle egret, Bubulcus ibis
- Green heron, Butorides virescens
- Striated heron, Butorides striata
- Agami heron, Agamia agami (vulnerable)
- Capped heron, Pilherodius pileatus
- Black-crowned night-heron, Nycticorax nycticorax
- Yellow-crowned night-heron, Nyctanassa violacea
- Boat-billed heron, Cochlearius cochlearius

== Ibises and spoonbills ==
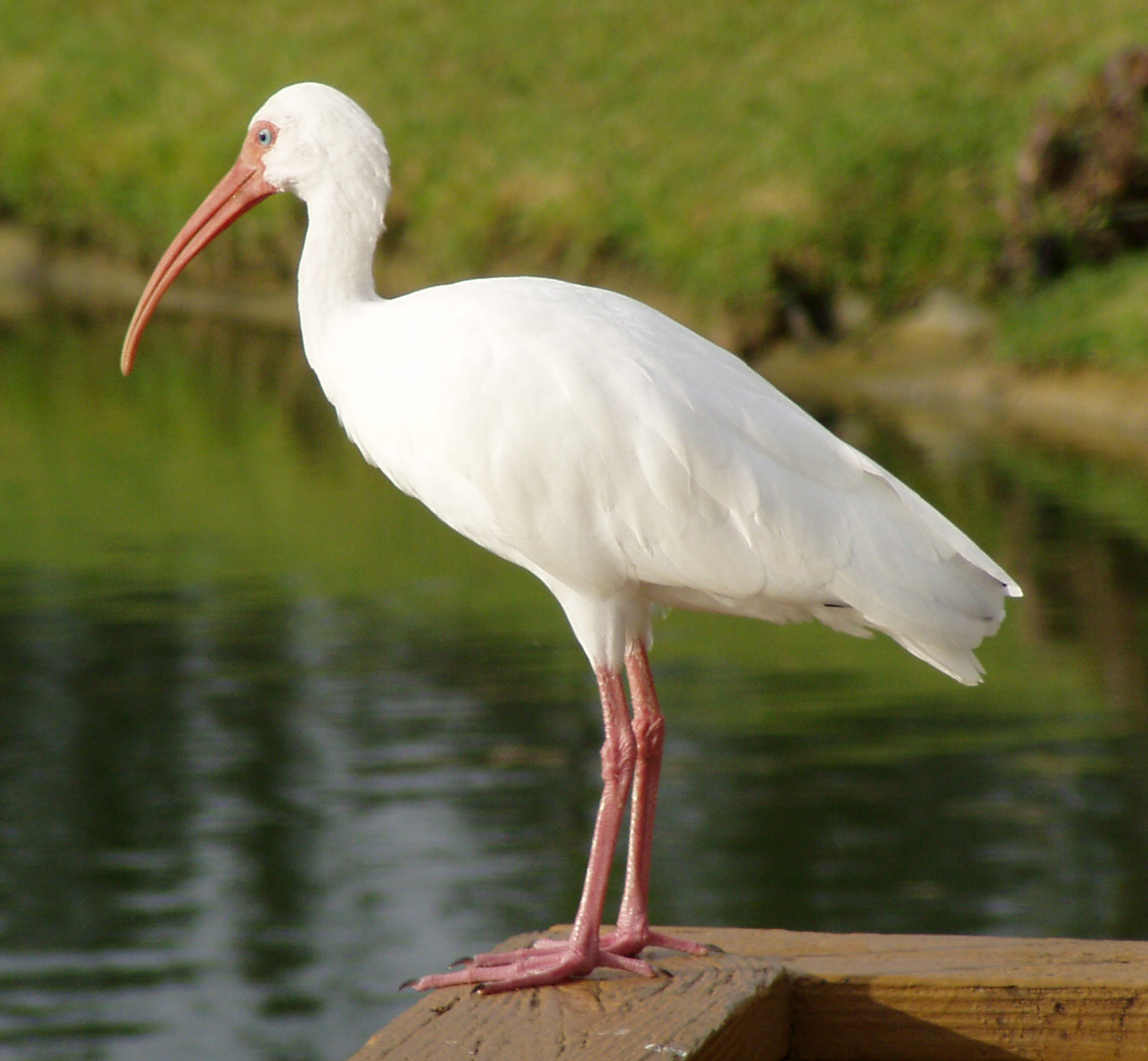
White ibis, seen in flocks in mangroves and on mudflats.

Order: Pelecaniformes Family: Threskiornithidae

Threskiornithidae is a family of large terrestrial and wading birds which includes the ibises and spoonbills. They have long, broad wings with 11 primary and about 20 secondary feathers. They are strong fliers and, despite their size and weight, very capable soarers.

- White ibis, Eudocimus albus
- Scarlet ibis, Eudocimus ruber (A)
- Glossy ibis, Plegadis falcinellus (A)
- White-faced ibis, Plegadis chihi (A)
- Green ibis, Mesembrinibis cayennensis
- Buff-necked ibis, Theristicus caudatus (A)
- Bare-faced ibis, Phimosus infuscatus (A)
- Roseate spoonbill, Platalea ajaja

== New World vultures ==
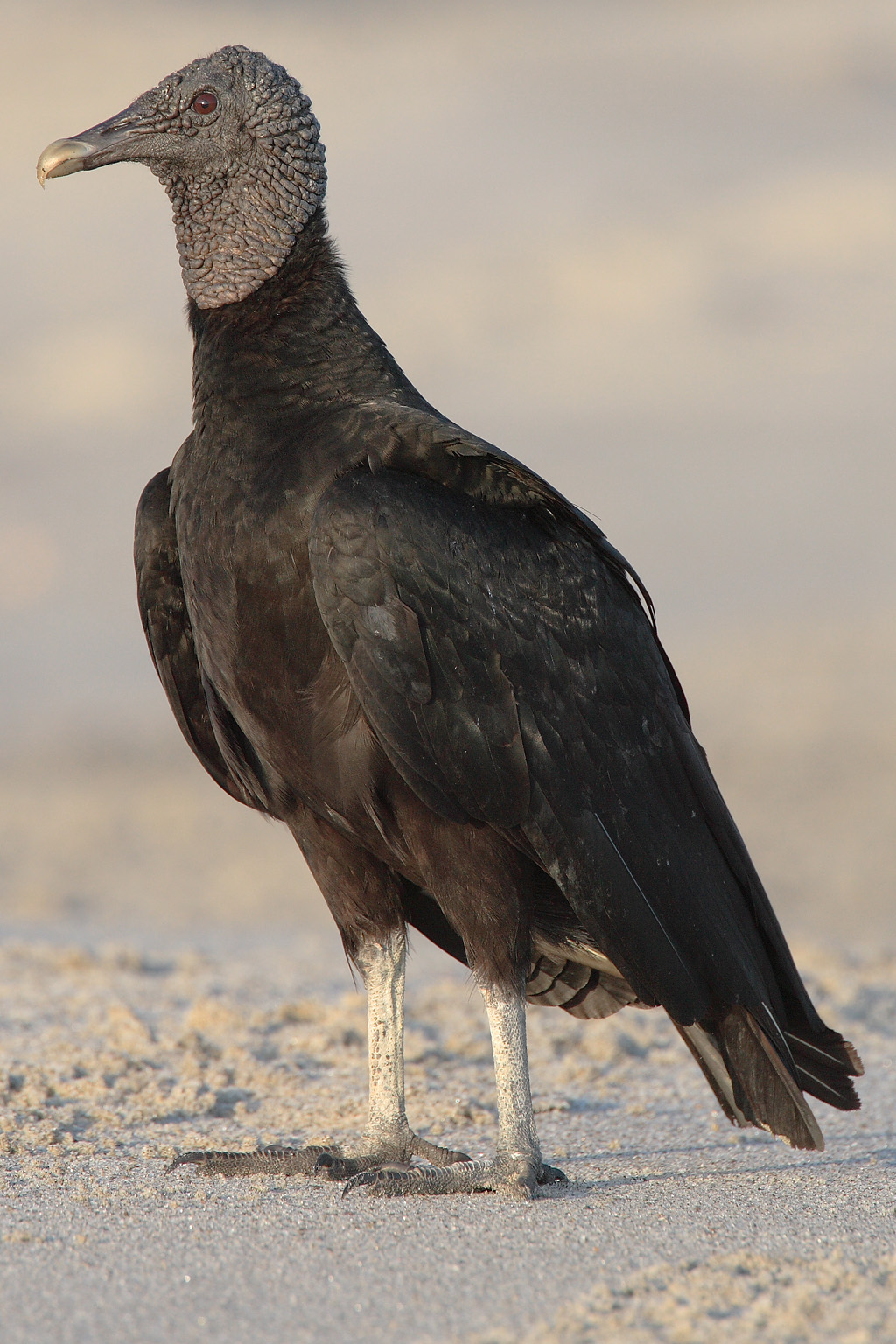
Black vulture is very common around towns and cities.

Order: Cathartiformes Family: Cathartidae

The New World vultures are not closely related to Old World vultures, but superficially resemble them because of convergent evolution. Like the Old World vultures, they are scavengers. However, unlike Old World vultures, which find carcasses by sight, New World vultures have a good sense of smell with which they locate carrion.

- King vulture, Sarcoramphus papa
- Black vulture, Coragyps atratus
- Turkey vulture, Cathartes aura
- Lesser yellow-headed vulture, Cathartes burrovianus

== Osprey ==
Order: Accipitriformes Family: Pandionidae

The family Pandionidae contains only one species, the osprey. The osprey is a medium-large raptor which is a specialist fish-eater with a worldwide distribution.

- Osprey, Pandion haliaetus

== Hawks, eagles, and kites ==
Order: Accipitriformes Family: Accipitridae

Accipitridae is a family of birds of prey, which includes hawks, eagles, kites, harriers, and Old World vultures. These birds have powerful hooked beaks for tearing flesh from their prey, strong legs, powerful talons, and keen eyesight.

- Pearl kite, Gampsonyx swainsonii (A)
- White-tailed kite, Elanus leucurus
- Hook-billed kite, Chondrohierax uncinatus
- Gray-headed kite, Leptodon cayanensis
- Swallow-tailed kite, Elanoides forficatus
- Crested eagle, Morphnus guianensis (near-threatened)
- Harpy eagle, Harpia harpyja (near-threatened)
- Black hawk-eagle, Spizaetus tyrannus
- Black-and-white hawk-eagle, Spizaetus melanoleucus
- Ornate hawk-eagle, Spizaetus ornatus (near-threatened)
- Double-toothed kite, Harpagus bidentatus
- Northern harrier, Circus hudsonius
- Long-winged harrier, Circus buffoni (A)
- Gray-bellied hawk, Accipiter poliogaster (A) (near-threatened)
- Tiny hawk, Accipiter superciliosus
- Sharp-shinned hawk, Accipiter striatus
- Cooper's hawk, Accipiter cooperii (A)
- Bicolored hawk, Accipiter bicolor
- Mississippi kite, Ictinia mississippiensis
- Plumbeous kite, Ictinia plumbea
- Black-collared hawk, Busarellus nigricollis
- Crane hawk, Geranospiza caerulescens
- Snail kite, Rostrhamus sociabilis
- Slender-billed kite, Helicolestes hamatus (A)
- Plumbeous hawk, Cryptoleucopteryx plumbea (vulnerable)
- Common black hawk, Buteogallus anthracinus
- Savanna hawk, Buteogallus meridionalis
- Great black hawk, Buteogallus urubitinga
- Solitary eagle, Buteogallus solitarius (near-threatened)
- Barred hawk, Morphnarchus princeps
- Roadside hawk, Rupornis magnirostris
- Harris's hawk, Parabuteo unicinctus (A)
- White-tailed hawk, Geranoaetus albicaudatus
- White hawk, Pseudastur albicollis
- Semiplumbeous hawk, Leucopternis semiplumbeus
- Gray hawk, Buteo plagiatus (A)
- Gray-lined hawk, Buteo nitidus
- Broad-winged hawk, Buteo platypterus
- Short-tailed hawk, Buteo brachyurus
- Swainson's hawk, Buteo swainsoni
- Zone-tailed hawk, Buteo albonotatus
- Red-tailed hawk, Buteo jamaicensis
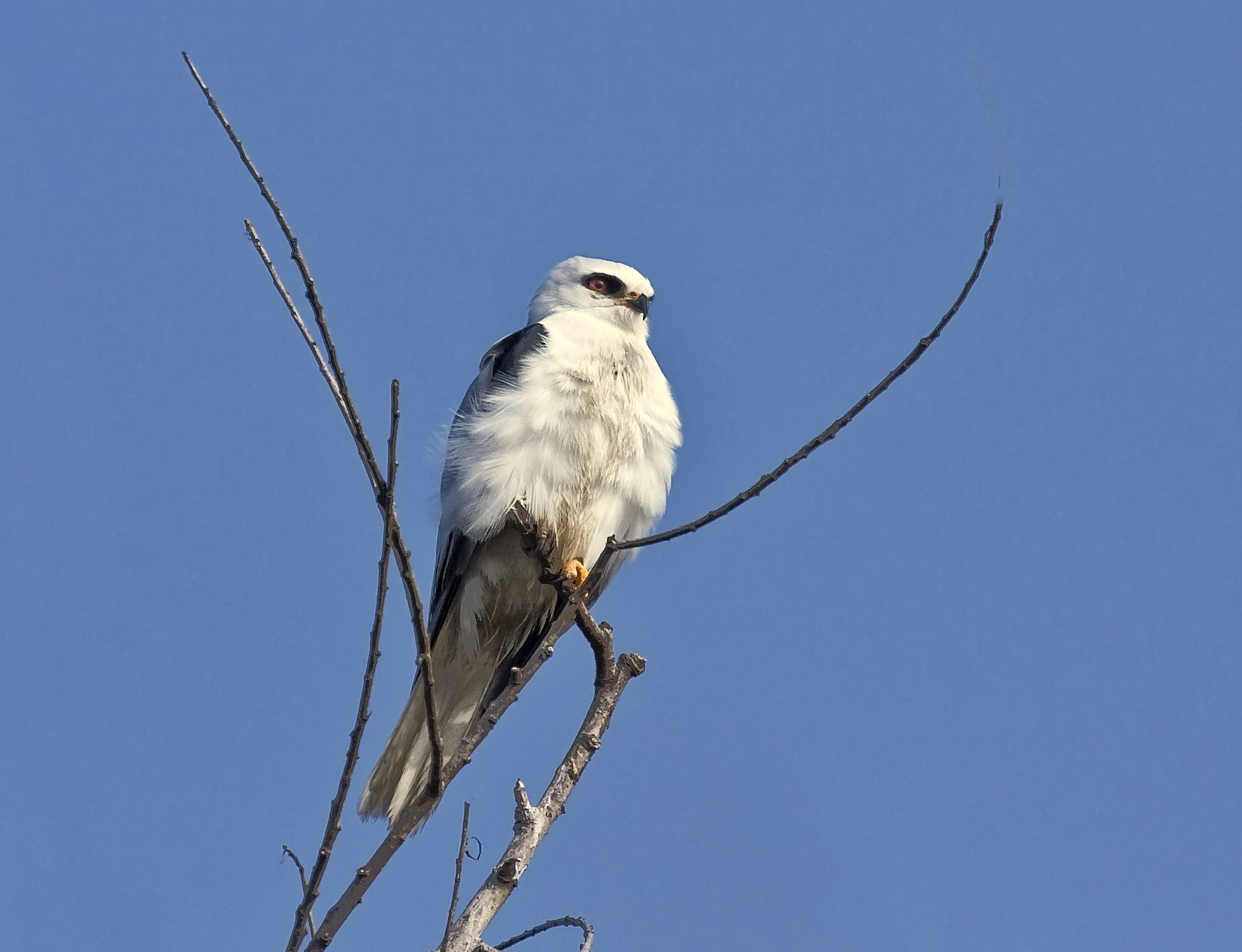
White-tailed kite, first recorded in 1967 and now common.

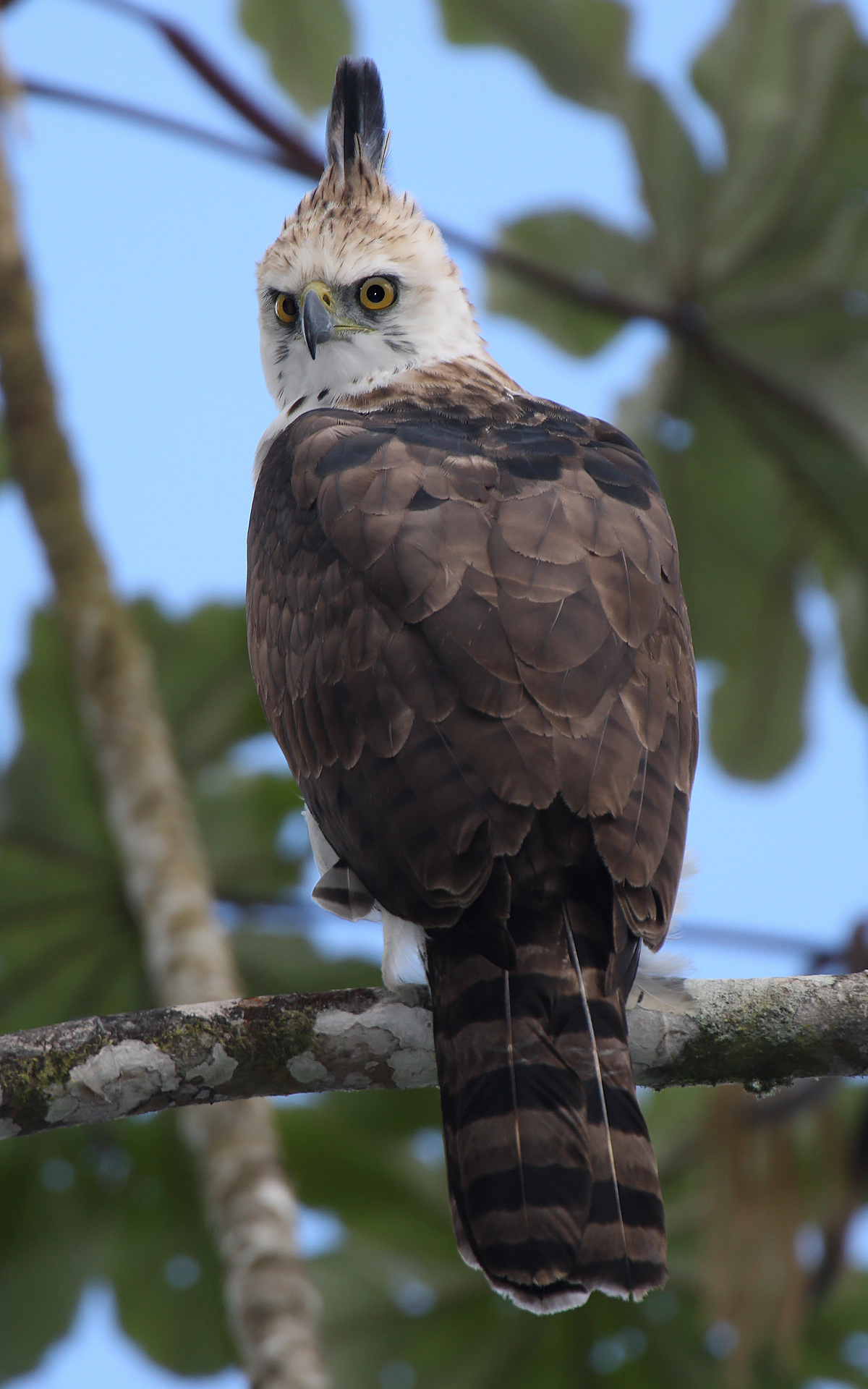
Ornate hawk-eagle, Darién. An uncommon raptor of forests.

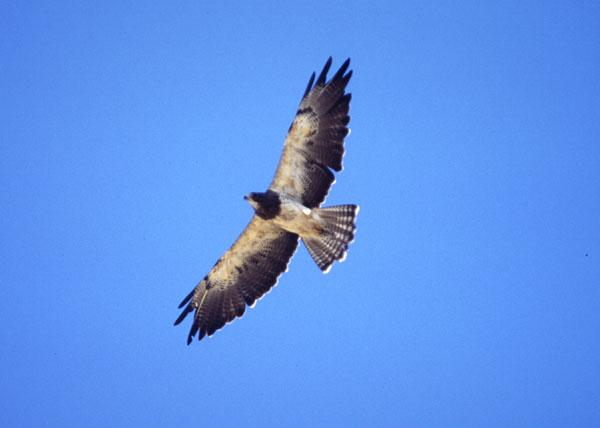
Swainson's hawk; large numbers pass through on migration.

== Barn-owls ==
Order: Strigiformes Family: Tytonidae

Barn-owls are medium to large owls with large heads and characteristic heart-shaped faces. They have long strong legs with powerful talons.

- American barn owl, Tyto furcata

== Owls ==
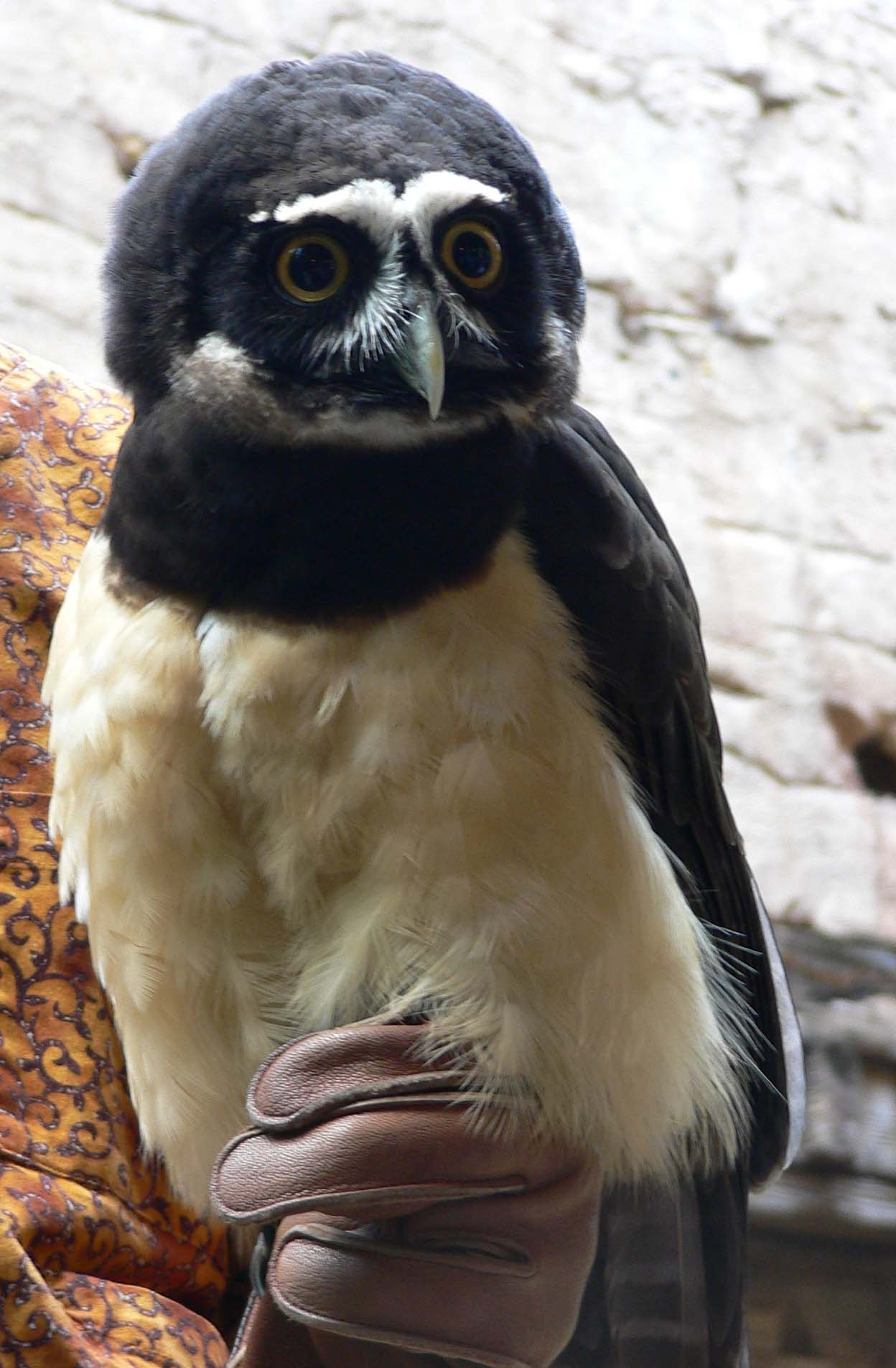
Spectacled owl, a nocturnal bird of humid forest and woodland.

Order: Strigiformes Family: Strigidae

The typical owls are small to large solitary nocturnal birds of prey. They have large forward-facing eyes and ears, a hawk-like beak, and a conspicuous circle of feathers around each eye called a facial disk.

- Bare-shanked screech-owl, Megascops clarkii
- Tropical screech-owl, Megascops choliba
- Middle-American screech-owl, Megascops guatemalae
- Choco screech-owl, Megascops centralis
- Crested owl, Lophostrix cristata
- Spectacled owl, Pulsatrix perspicillata
- Great horned owl, Bubo virginianus (A)
- Costa Rican pygmy-owl, Glaucidium costaricanum
- Central American pygmy-owl, Glaucidium griseiceps
- Ferruginous pygmy-owl, Glaucidium brasilianum
- Burrowing owl, Athene cunicularia (A)
- Mottled owl, Strix virgata
- Black-and-white owl, Strix nigrolineata
- Striped owl, Asio clamator
- Unspotted saw-whet owl, Aegolius ridgwayi (A)

== Trogons ==
Order: Trogoniformes Family: Trogonidae

The family Trogonidae includes trogons and quetzals. Found in tropical woodlands worldwide, they feed on insects and fruit, and their broad bills and weak legs reflect their diet and arboreal habits. Although their flight is fast, they are reluctant to fly any distance. Trogons have soft, often colorful, feathers with distinctive male and female plumages.

- Lattice-tailed trogon, Trogon clathratus
- Slaty-tailed trogon, Trogon massena
- Black-tailed trogon, Trogon melanurus
- White-tailed trogon, Trogon viridis
- Baird's trogon, Trogon bairdii (near-threatened)
- Gartered trogon, Trogon caligatus
- Northern black-throated trogon, Trogon tenellus
- Collared trogon, Trogon collaris
- Golden-headed quetzal, Pharomachrus auriceps
- Resplendent quetzal, Pharomachrus mocinno (near-threatened)

== Motmots ==
Order: Coraciiformes Family: Momotidae

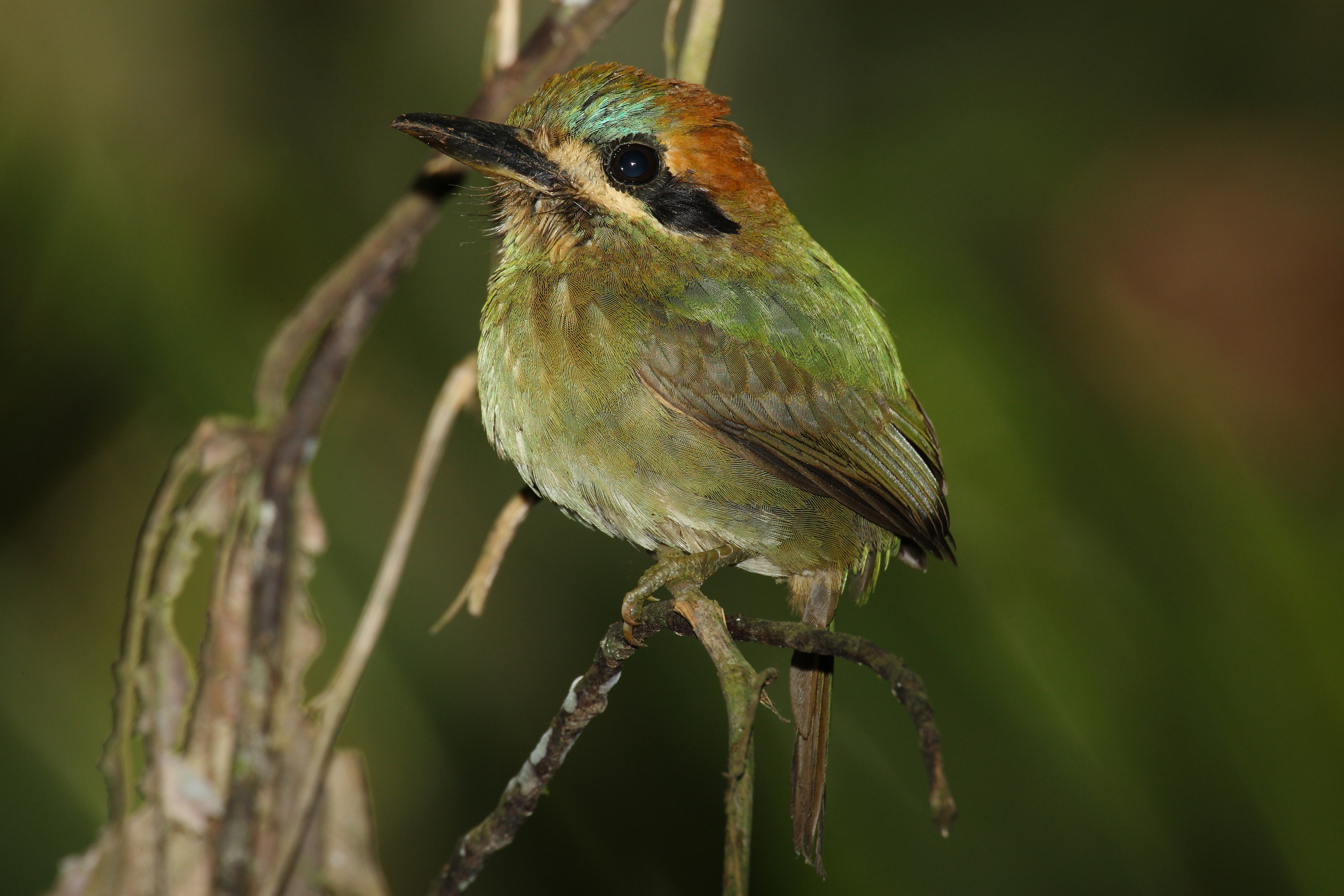
Tody motmot, Darién. A local and easily overlooked bird of humid forest.

The motmots have colorful plumage and long, graduated tails which they display by waggling back and forth. In most of the species, the barbs near the ends of the two longest (central) tail feathers are weak and fall off, leaving a length of bare shaft and creating a racket-shaped tail.

- Tody motmot, Hylomanes momotula
- Lesson's motmot, Momotus lessonii
- Whooping motmot, Momotus subrufescens
- Rufous motmot, Baryphthengus martii
- Broad-billed motmot, Electron platyrhynchum

== Kingfishers ==
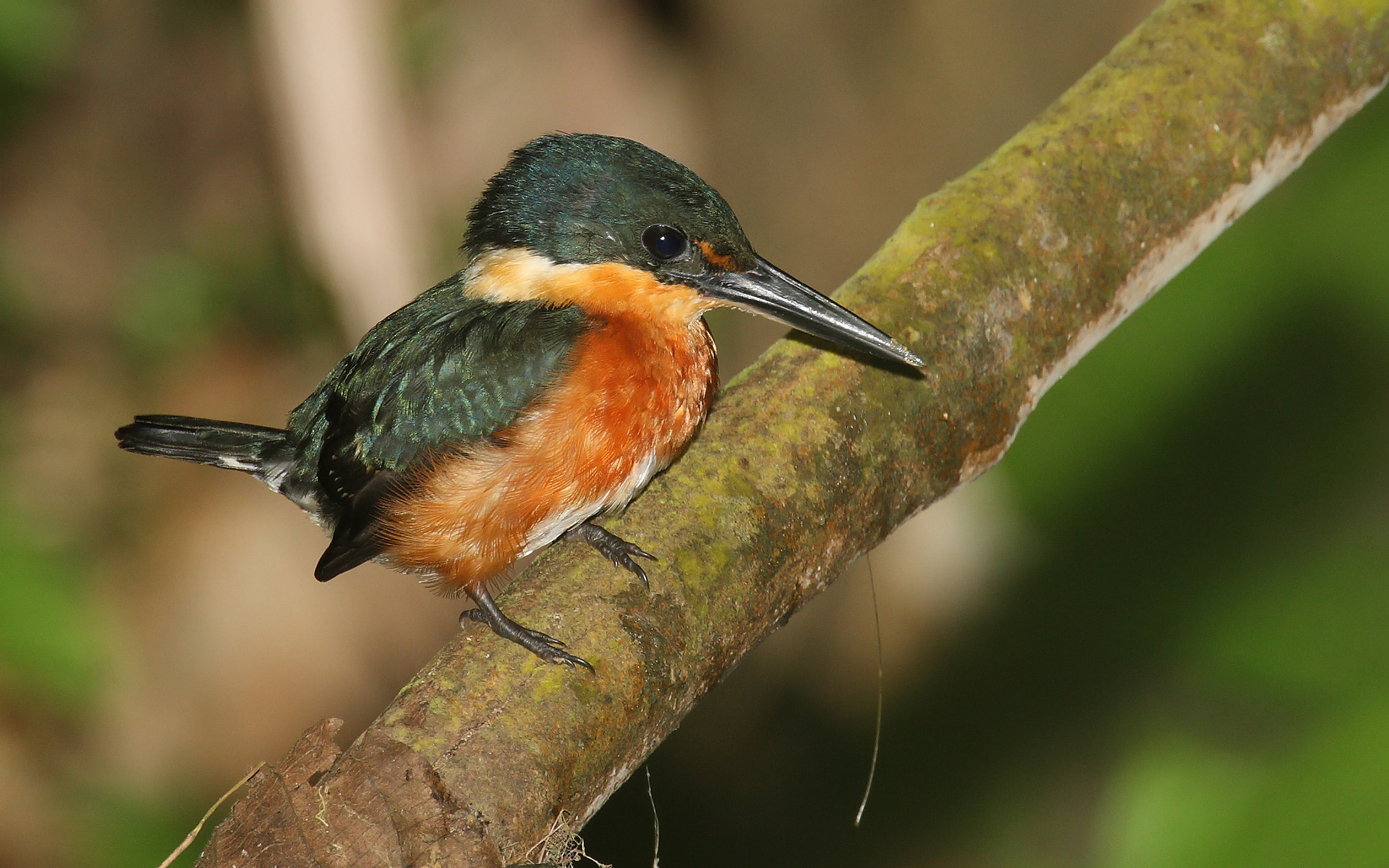
American pygmy kingfisher, Soberanía National Park. A shy bird of forest streams and mangroves.

Order: Coraciiformes Family: Alcedinidae

Kingfishers are medium-sized birds with large heads, long, pointed bills, short legs, and stubby tails.

- Ringed kingfisher, Megaceryle torquatus
- Belted kingfisher, Megaceryle alcyon
- Amazon kingfisher, Chloroceryle amazona
- American pygmy kingfisher, Chloroceryle aenea
- Green kingfisher, Chloroceryle americana
- Green-and-rufous kingfisher, Chloroceryle inda

== Puffbirds ==
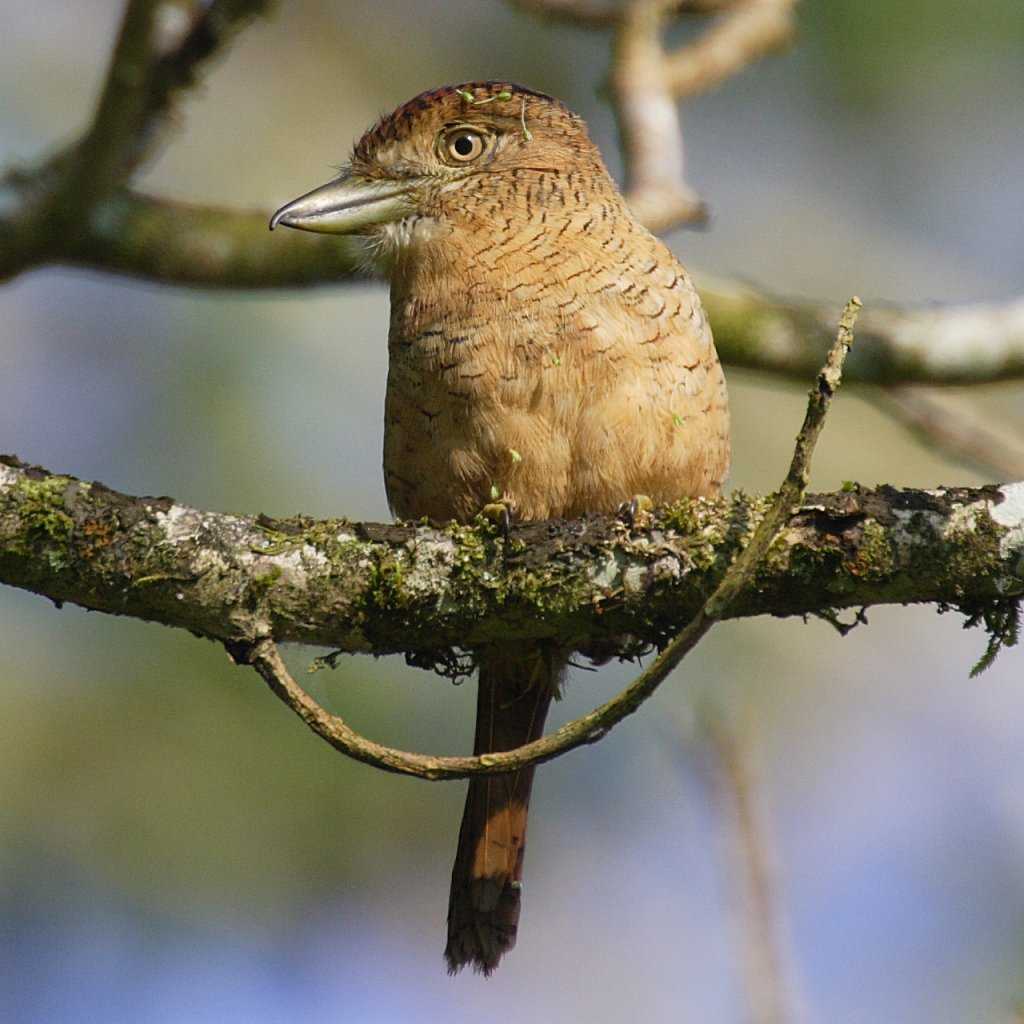
Barred puffbird, Darién. A scarce bird of humid forest.

Order: Piciformes Family: Bucconidae

The puffbirds are related to the jacamars and have the same range, but lack the iridescent colors of that family. They are mainly brown, rufous, or gray, with large heads and flattened bills with hooked tips. The loose abundant plumage and short tails makes them look stout and puffy, giving rise to the English common name of the family.

- Barred puffbird, Nystalus radiatus
- Russet-throated puffbird, Hypnelus ruficollis (A)
- White-necked puffbird, Notharchus hyperrhynchus
- Black-breasted puffbird, Notharchus pectoralis
- Pied puffbird, Notharchus tectus
- White-whiskered puffbird, Malacoptila panamensis
- Lanceolated monklet, Micromonacha lanceolata
- Gray-cheeked nunlet, Nonnula frontalis
- White-fronted nunbird, Monasa morphoeus

== Jacamars ==
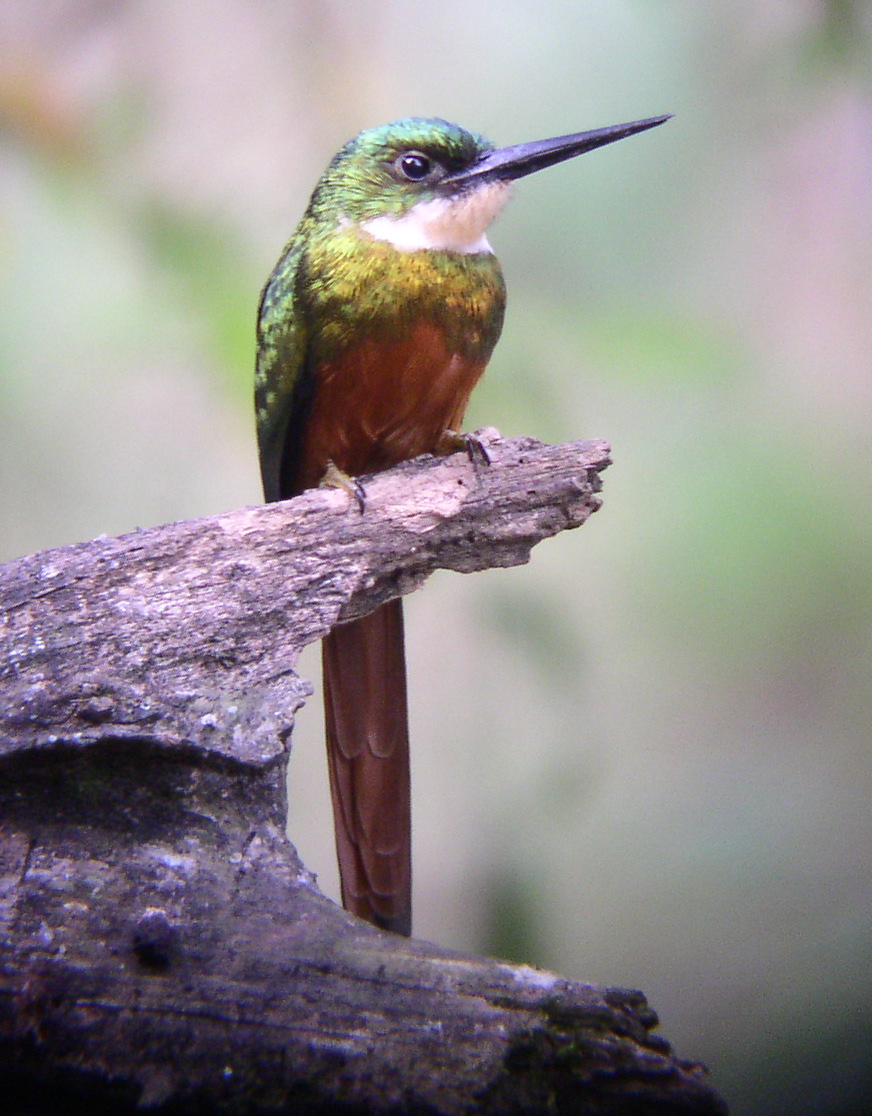
Rufous-tailed jacamar is found in eastern and western Panama.

Order: Piciformes Family: Galbulidae

The jacamars are near passerine birds from tropical South America, with a range that extends up to Mexico. They feed on insects caught on the wing and are glossy, elegant birds with long bills and tails. They resemble the Old World bee-eaters, although they are more closely related to puffbirds.

- Dusky-backed jacamar, Brachygalba salmoni
- Rufous-tailed jacamar, Galbula ruficauda
- Great jacamar, Jacamerops aureus

== New World barbets ==
Order: Piciformes Family: Capitonidae

The barbets are plump birds, with short necks and large heads. They get their name from the bristles which fringe their heavy bills. Most species are brightly colored.

- Spot-crowned barbet, Capito maculicoronatus
- Red-headed barbet, Eubucco bourcierii

== Toucan-barbets ==
Order: Piciformes Family: Semnornithidae

The toucan-barbets are birds of montane forests in the Neotropics. They are highly social and non-migratory.

- Prong-billed barbet, Semnornis frantzii

== Toucans ==
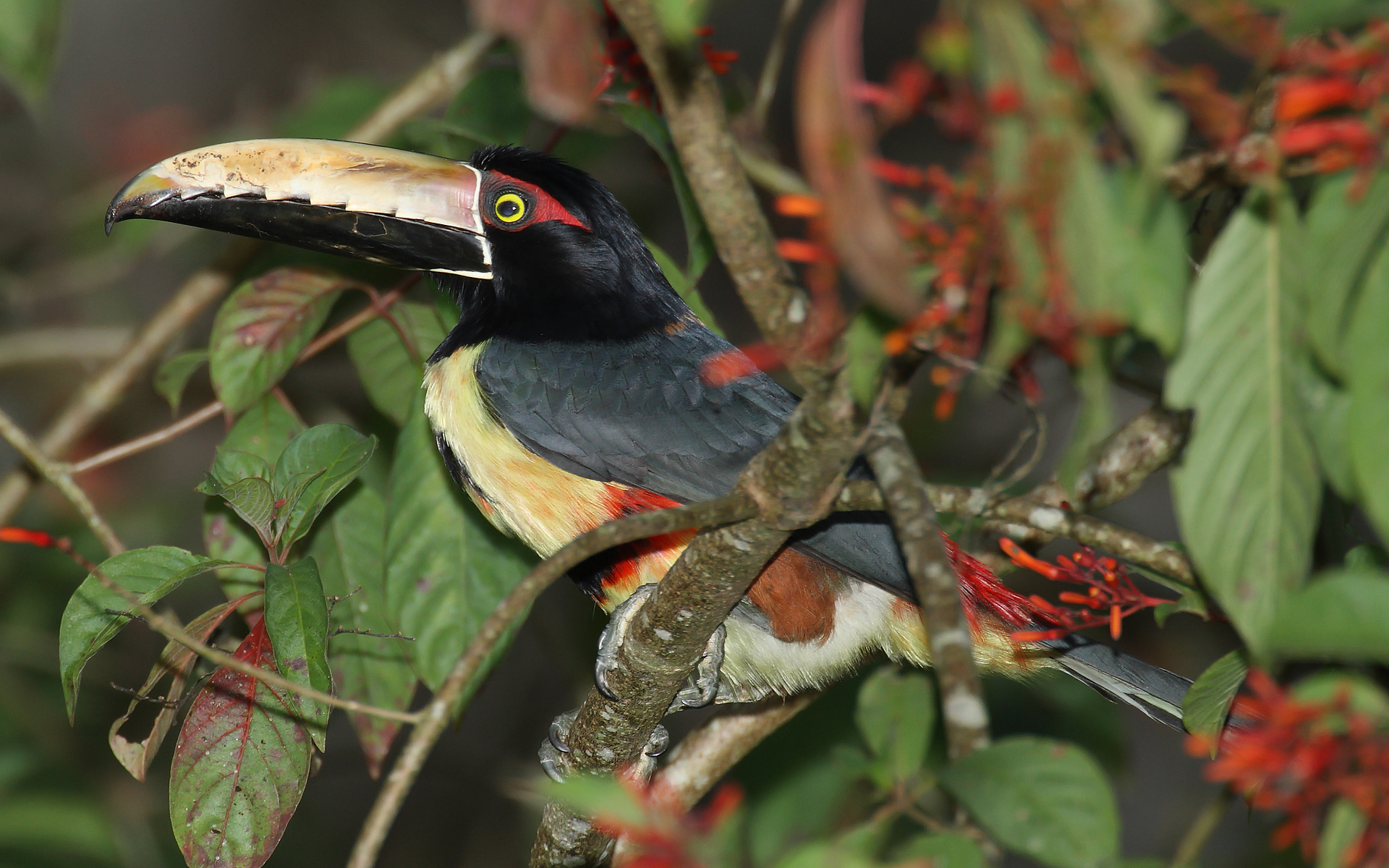
Collared aracari, Darién. Common in forested areas.

Order: Piciformes Family: Ramphastidae

Toucans are near passerine birds from the Neotropics. They are brightly marked and have enormous, colorful bills which in some species amount to half their body length.

- Northern emerald-toucanet, Aulacorhynchus prasinus
- Collared aracari, Pteroglossus torquatus
- Fiery-billed aracari, Pteroglossus frantzii
- Yellow-eared toucanet, Selenidera spectabilis
- Keel-billed toucan, Ramphastos sulfuratus
- Choco toucan, Ramphastos brevis (A)
- Yellow-throated toucan, Ramphastos ambiguus (near-threatened)

== Woodpeckers ==
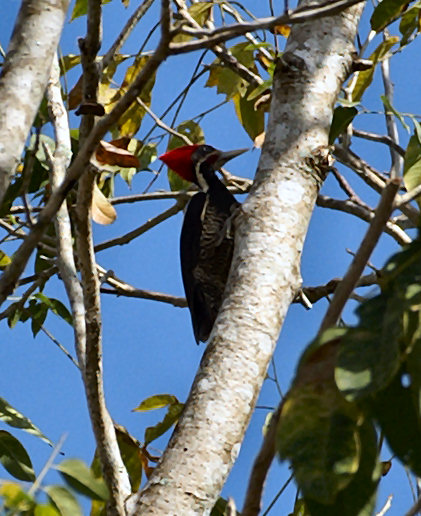
Lineated woodpecker, a large woodpecker of forest edges and clearings.

Order: Piciformes Family: Picidae

Woodpeckers are small to medium-sized birds with chisel-like beaks, short legs, stiff tails, and long tongues used for capturing insects. Some species have feet with two toes pointing forward and two backward, while several species have only three toes. Many woodpeckers have the habit of tapping noisily on tree trunks with their beaks.

- Olivaceous piculet, Picumnus olivaceus
- Acorn woodpecker, Melanerpes formicivorus
- Golden-naped woodpecker, Melanerpes chrysauchen
- Black-cheeked woodpecker, Melanerpes pucherani
- Red-crowned woodpecker, Melanerpes rubricapillus
- Hoffmann's woodpecker, Melanerpes hoffmannii (A)
- Yellow-bellied sapsucker, Sphyrapicus varius
- Hairy woodpecker, Dryobates villosus
- Smoky-brown woodpecker, Dryobates fumigatus
- Red-rumped woodpecker, Veniliornis kirkii
- Rufous-winged woodpecker, Piculus simplex
- Stripe-cheeked woodpecker, Piculus callopterus (E)
- Golden-green woodpecker, Piculus chrysochloros
- Golden-olive woodpecker, Piculus rubiginosus
- Spot-breasted woodpecker, Colaptes punctigula
- Cinnamon woodpecker, Celeus loricatus
- Chestnut-colored woodpecker, Celeus castaneus
- Lineated woodpecker, Dryocopus lineatus
- Crimson-bellied woodpecker, Campephilus haematogaster
- Crimson-crested woodpecker, Campephilus melanoleucos
- Pale-billed woodpecker, Campephilus guatemalensis

== Falcons and caracaras ==
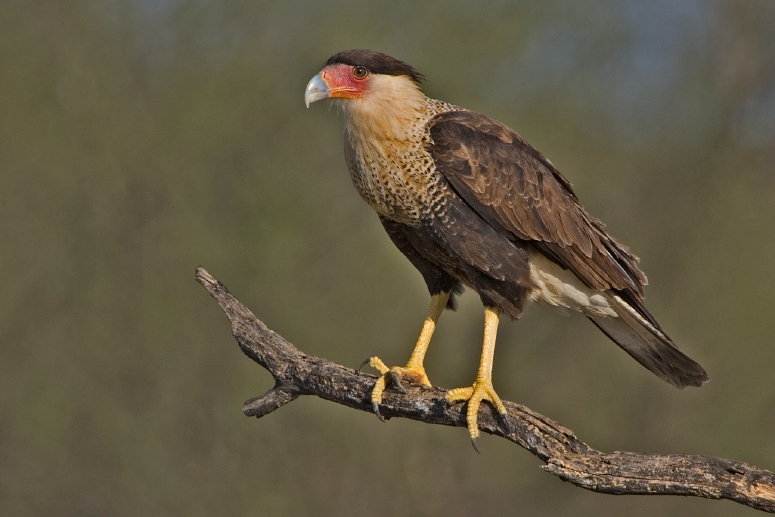
Crested caracara, a bird of open grassland and farmland.

Order: Falconiformes Family: Falconidae

Falconidae is a family of diurnal birds of prey. They differ from hawks, eagles, and kites in that they kill with their beaks instead of their talons.

- Laughing falcon, Herpetotheres cachinnans
- Barred forest-falcon, Micrastur ruficollis
- Slaty-backed forest-falcon, Micrastur mirandollei
- Collared forest-falcon, Micrastur semitorquatus
- Red-throated caracara, Ibycter americanus
- Crested caracara, Caracara plancus
- Yellow-headed caracara, Milvago chimachima
- American kestrel, Falco sparverius
- Merlin, Falco columbarius
- Aplomado falcon, Falco femoralis
- Bat falcon, Falco rufigularis
- Orange-breasted falcon, Falco deiroleucus (A) (near-threatened)
- Peregrine falcon, Falco peregrinus

== New World and African parrots ==
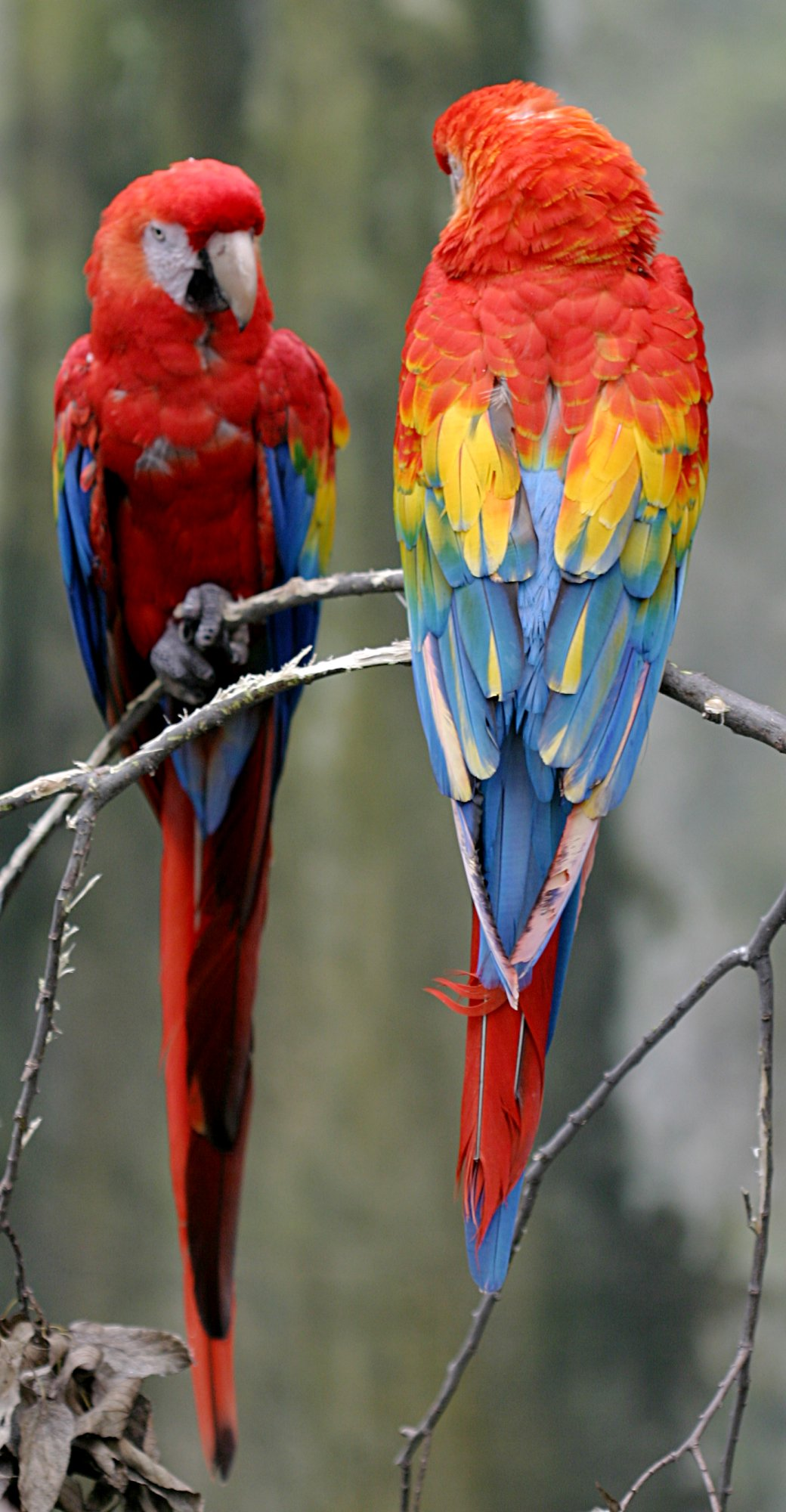
Scarlet macaws are now very rare except on Coiba Island.

Order: Psittaciformes Family: Psittacidae

Parrots are small to large birds with a characteristic curved beak. Their upper mandibles have slight mobility in the joint with the skull and they have a generally erect stance. All parrots are zygodactyl, having the four toes on each foot placed two at the front and two to the back.

- Painted parakeet, Pyrrhura picta
- Sulphur-winged parakeet, Pyrrhura hoffmanni
- Olive-throated parakeet, Eupsittula nana
- Brown-throated parakeet, Eupsittula pertinax
- Blue-and-yellow macaw, Ara ararauna
- Chestnut-fronted macaw, Ara severus
- Scarlet macaw, Ara macao
- Red-and-green macaw, Ara chloropterus
- Great green macaw, Ara ambiguus (endangered)
- Crimson-fronted parakeet, Psittacara finschi
- Barred parakeet, Bolborhynchus lineola
- Spectacled parrotlet, Forpus conspicillatus
- Orange-chinned parakeet, Brotogeris jugularis
- Red-fronted parrotlet, Touit costaricensis (vulnerable)
- Blue-fronted parrotlet, Touit dilectissimus
- Brown-hooded parrot, Pyrilia haematotis
- Saffron-headed parrot, Pyrilia pyrilia (near-threatened)
- Blue-headed parrot, Pionus menstruus
- White-crowned parrot, Pionus senilis
- Red-lored parrot, Amazona autumnalis
- Mealy parrot, Amazona farinosa
- Yellow-crowned parrot, Amazona ochrocephala

== Sapayoa ==
Order: Passeriformes Family: Sapayoidae

The sapayoa is the only member of its family, and is found in the lowland rainforests of Panama and north-western South America. It is usually seen in pairs or mixed-species flocks.

- Sapayoa, Sapayoa aenigma

== Manakins ==
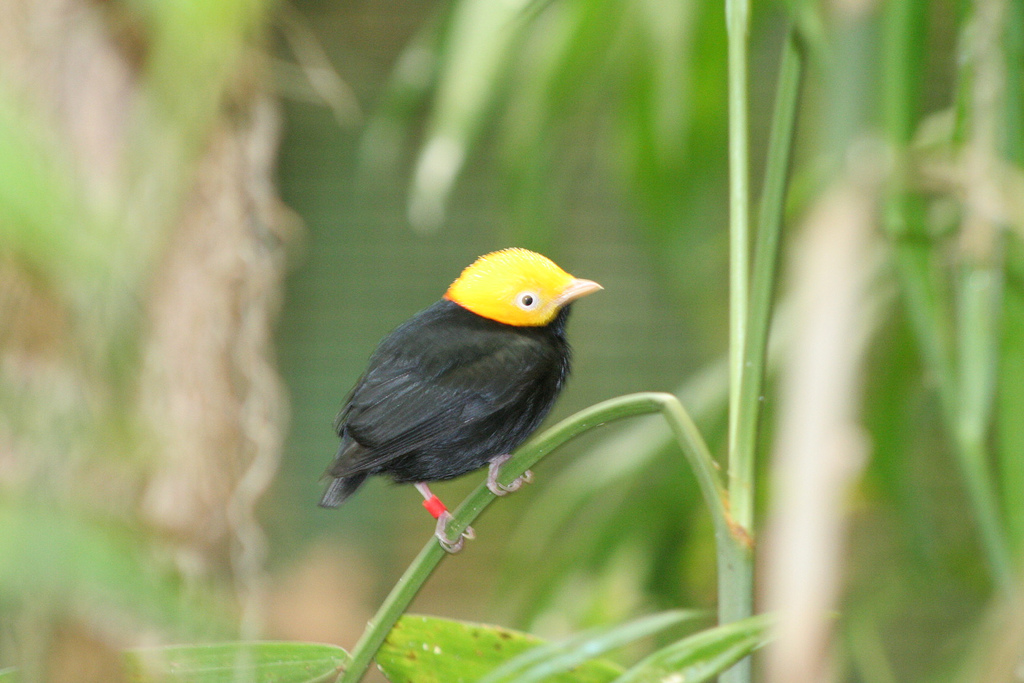
Golden-headed manakin inhabits forest and woodland in eastern Panama.

Order: Passeriformes Family: Pipridae

The manakins are a family of subtropical and tropical mainland Central and South America, and Trinidad and Tobago. They are compact forest birds, the males typically being brightly colored, although the females of most species are duller and usually green-plumaged. Manakins feed on small fruits, berries, and insects.

- Lance-tailed manakin, Chiroxiphia lanceolata
- White-ruffed manakin, Corapipo altera
- Green manakin, Cryptopipo holochlora
- Blue-crowned manakin, Lepidothrix coronata
- White-collared manakin, Manacus candei
- Orange-collared manakin, Manacus aurantiacus
- Golden-collared manakin, Manacus vitellinus
- White-crowned manakin, Pseudopipra pipra
- Red-capped manakin, Ceratopipra mentalis
- Golden-headed manakin, Ceratopipra erythrocephala

== Cotingas ==
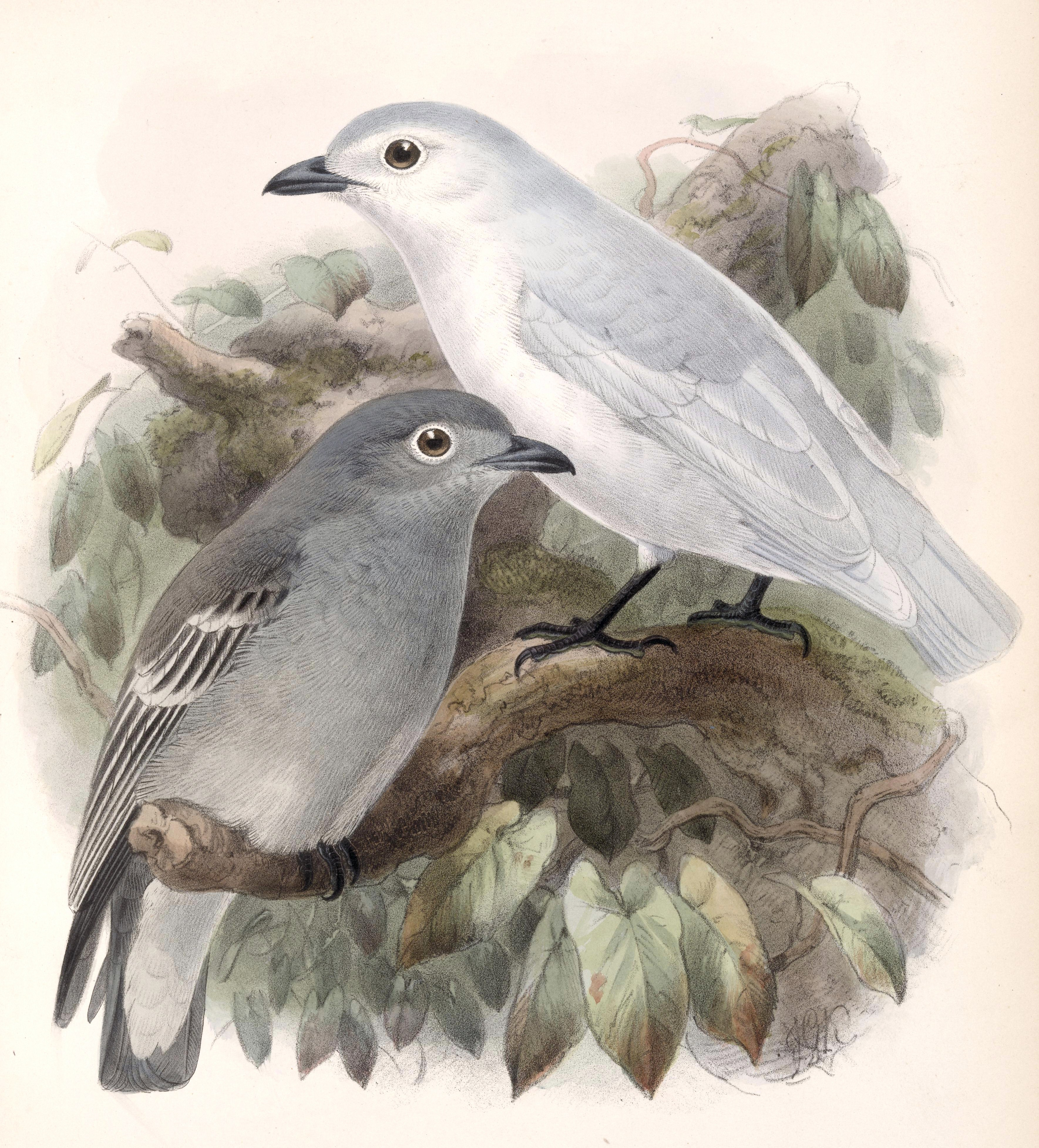
Snowy cotinga, an uncommon bird of the forests of Bocas del Toro.

Order: Passeriformes Family: Cotingidae

The cotingas are birds of forests or forest edges in tropical Central and South America. Comparatively little is known about this diverse group, although all have broad bills with hooked tips, rounded wings, and strong legs. The males of many of the species are brightly colored or decorated with plumes or wattles.

- Purple-throated fruitcrow, Querula purpurata
- Bare-necked umbrellabird, Cephalopterus glabricollis (endangered)
- Lovely cotinga, Cotinga amabilis (A)
- Turquoise cotinga, Cotinga ridgwayi (vulnerable)
- Blue cotinga, Cotinga nattererii
- Rufous piha, Lipaugus unirufus
- Three-wattled bellbird, Procnias tricarunculata (vulnerable)
- Black-tipped cotinga, Carpodectes hopkei
- Yellow-billed cotinga, Carpodectes antoniae (endangered)
- Snowy cotinga, Carpodectes nitidus

== Tityras and allies ==
Order: Passeriformes Family: Tityridae

Tityridae are suboscine passerine birds found in forest and woodland in the Neotropics. The species in this family were formerly spread over the families Tyrannidae, Pipridae, and Cotingidae. They are small to medium-sized birds. They do not have the sophisticated vocal capabilities of the songbirds. Most, but not all, have plain coloring.

- Northern schiffornis, Schiffornis veraepacis
- Russet-winged schiffornis, Schiffornis stenorhyncha
- Speckled mourner, Laniocera rufescens
- Masked tityra, Tityra semifasciata
- Black-crowned tityra, Tityra inquisitor
- Barred becard, Pachyramphus versicolor
- Cinereous becard, Pachyramphus rufus
- Cinnamon becard, Pachyramphus cinnamomeus
- White-winged becard, Pachyramphus polychopterus
- Black-and-white becard, Pachyramphus albogriseus
- Rose-throated becard, Pachyramphus aglaiae
- One-colored becard, Pachyramphus homochrous

== Royal flycatcher and allies ==
Order: Passeriformes Family: Onychorhynchidae

The members of this small family, created in 2018, were formerly considered to be tyrant flycatchers, family Tyrannidae.

- Sharpbill, Oxyruncus cristatus
- Royal flycatcher, Onychorhynchus mexicanus
- Ruddy-tailed flycatcher, Terenotriccus erythrurus
- Tawny-breasted flycatcher, Myiobius villosus (A)
- Sulphur-rumped flycatcher, Myiobius sulphureipygius
- Black-tailed flycatcher, Myiobius atricaudus

== Tyrant flycatchers ==
Order: Passeriformes Family: Tyrannidae

Tyrant flycatchers are passerine birds which occur throughout North and South America. They superficially resemble the Old World flycatchers, but are more robust and have stronger bills. They do not have the sophisticated vocal capabilities of the songbirds. Most, but not all, have plain coloring. As the name implies, most are insectivorous.

- Gray-headed piprites, Piprites griseiceps (A)
- Stub-tailed spadebill, Platyrinchus cancrominus
- White-throated spadebill, Platyrinchus mystaceus
- Golden-crowned spadebill, Platyrinchus coronatus
- Olive-striped flycatcher, Mionectes olivaceus
- Ochre-bellied flycatcher, Mionectes oleagineus
- Sepia-capped flycatcher, Leptopogon amaurocephalus
- Slaty-capped flycatcher, Leptopogon superciliaris
- Yellow-green tyrannulet, Phylloscartes flavovirens (E)
- Rufous-browed tyrannulet, Phylloscartes superciliaris
- Bronze-olive pygmy-tyrant, Pseudotriccus pelzelni
- Black-capped pygmy-tyrant, Myiornis atricapillus
- Scale-crested pygmy-tyrant, Lophotriccus pileatus
- Pale-eyed pygmy-tyrant, Lophotriccus pilaris
- Northern bentbill, Oncostoma cinereigulare
- Southern bentbill, Oncostoma olivaceum
- Slate-headed tody-flycatcher, Poecilotriccus sylvia
- Common tody-flycatcher, Todirostrum cinereum
- Black-headed tody-flycatcher, Todirostrum nigriceps
- Brownish twistwing, Cnipodectes subbrunneus
- Eye-ringed flatbill, Rhynchocyclus brevirostris
- Olivaceous flatbill, Rhynchocyclus olivaceus
- Yellow-olive flycatcher, Tolmomyias sulphurescens
- Yellow-margined flycatcher, Tolmomyias assimilis
- Yellow-breasted flycatcher, Tolmomyias flaviventris
- Yellow-bellied tyrannulet, Ornithion semiflavum (A)
- Brown-capped tyrannulet, Ornithion brunneicapillus
- Southern beardless-tyrannulet, Camptostoma obsoletum
- Mouse-colored tyrannulet, Nesotriccus murinus
- Yellow tyrannulet, Capsiempis flaveola
- Yellow-crowned tyrannulet, Tyrannulus elatus
- Forest elaenia, Myiopagis gaimardii
- Gray elaenia, Myiopagis caniceps
- Greenish elaenia, Myiopagis viridicata
- Yellow-bellied elaenia, Elaenia flavogaster
- Lesser elaenia, Elaenia chiriquensis
- Mountain elaenia, Elaenia frantzii
- Torrent tyrannulet, Serpophaga cinerea
- Rough-legged tyrannulet, Phyllomyias burmeisteri
- Sooty-headed tyrannulet, Phyllomyias griseiceps
- Mistletoe tyrannulet, Zimmerius parvus
- Bright-rumped attila, Attila spadiceus
- Choco sirystes, Sirystes albogriseus
- Rufous mourner, Rhytipterna holerythra
- Dusky-capped flycatcher, Myiarchus tuberculifer
- Panama flycatcher, Myiarchus panamensis
- Great crested flycatcher, Myiarchus crinitus
- Lesser kiskadee, Pitangus lictor
- Great kiskadee, Pitangus sulphuratus
- Cattle tyrant, Machetornis rixosa (A)
- Boat-billed flycatcher, Megarynchus pitangua
- Rusty-margined flycatcher, Myiozetetes cayanensis
- Social flycatcher, Myiozetetes similis
- Gray-capped flycatcher, Myiozetetes granadensis
- White-ringed flycatcher, Conopias albovittatus
- Golden-bellied flycatcher, Myiodynastes hemichrysus
- Golden-crowned flycatcher, Myiodynastes chrysocephalus
- Streaked flycatcher, Myiodynastes maculatus
- Sulphur-bellied flycatcher, Myiodynastes luteiventris
- Piratic flycatcher, Legatus leucophaius
- Variegated flycatcher, Empidonomus varius (A)
- Crowned slaty flycatcher, Empidonomus aurantioatrocristatus (A)
- Tropical kingbird, Tyrannus melancholicus
- Cassin's kingbird, Tyrannus vociferans (A)
- Western kingbird, Tyrannus verticalis (A)
- Eastern kingbird, Tyrannus tyrannus
- Gray kingbird, Tyrannus dominicensis
- Scissor-tailed flycatcher, Tyrannus forficatus
- Fork-tailed flycatcher, Tyrannus savana
- Bran-colored flycatcher, Myiophobus fasciatus
- Black-billed flycatcher, Aphanotriccus audax (near-threatened)
- Tufted flycatcher, Mitrephanes phaeocercus
- Olive-sided flycatcher, Contopus cooperi (near-threatened)
- Dark pewee, Contopus lugubris
- Ochraceous pewee, Contopus ochraceus
- Western wood-pewee, Contopus sordidulus
- Eastern wood-pewee, Contopus virens
- Tropical pewee, Contopus cinereus
- Yellow-bellied flycatcher, Empidonax flaviventris
- Acadian flycatcher, Empidonax virescens
- Alder flycatcher, Empidonax alnorum
- Willow flycatcher, Empidonax traillii
- White-throated flycatcher, Empidonax albigularis
- Least flycatcher, Empidonax minimus (near-threatened)
- Hammond's flycatcher, Empidonax hammondii (A)
- Yellowish flycatcher, Empidonax flavescens
- Black-capped flycatcher, Empidonax atriceps
- Black phoebe, Sayornis nigricans
- Vermilion flycatcher, Pyrocephalus rubinus (A)
- Pied water-tyrant, Fluvicola pica
- Northern scrub-flycatcher, Sublegatus arenarum
- Long-tailed tyrant, Colonia colonus
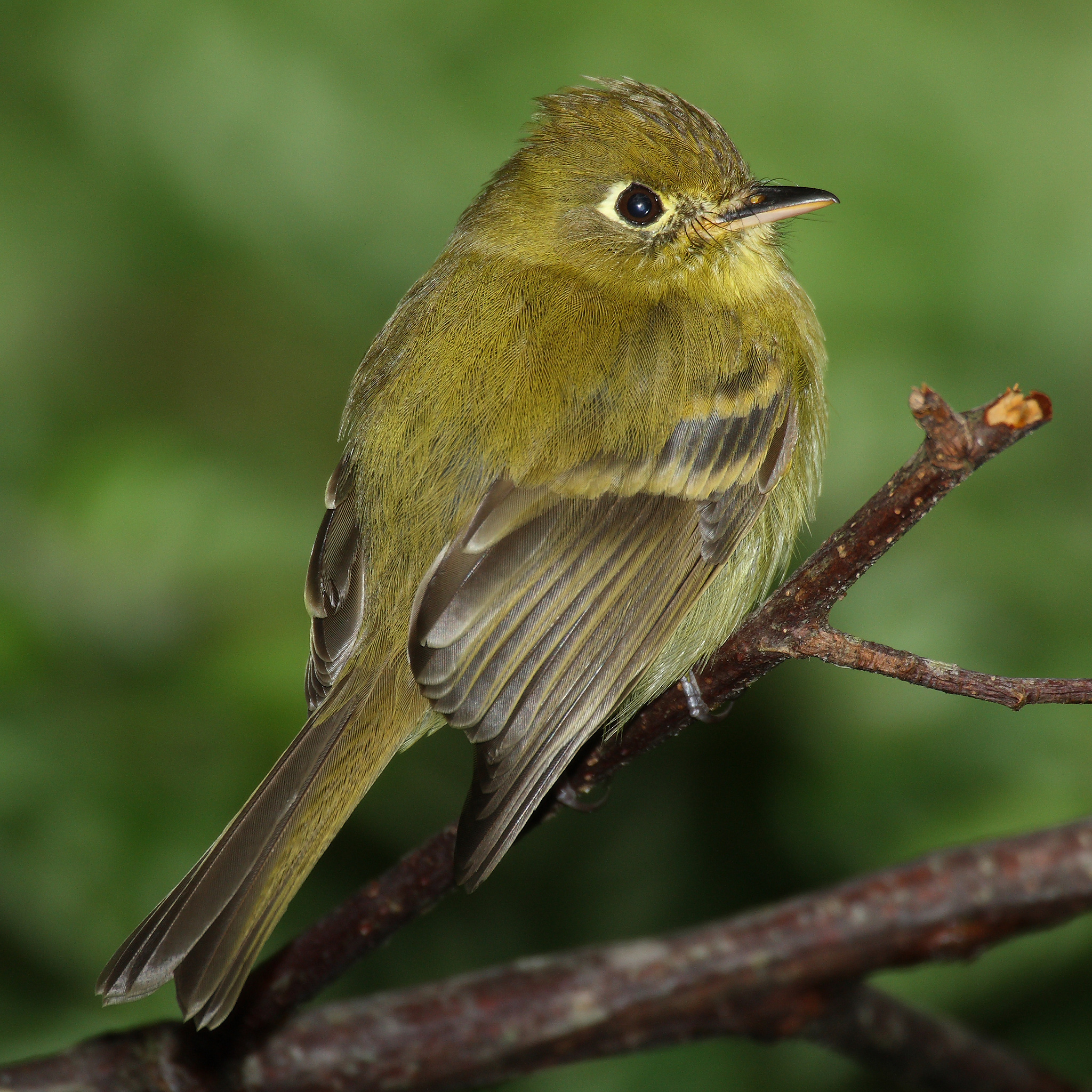
Yellowish flycatcher, La Amistad International Park. Fairly common in the western highlands.

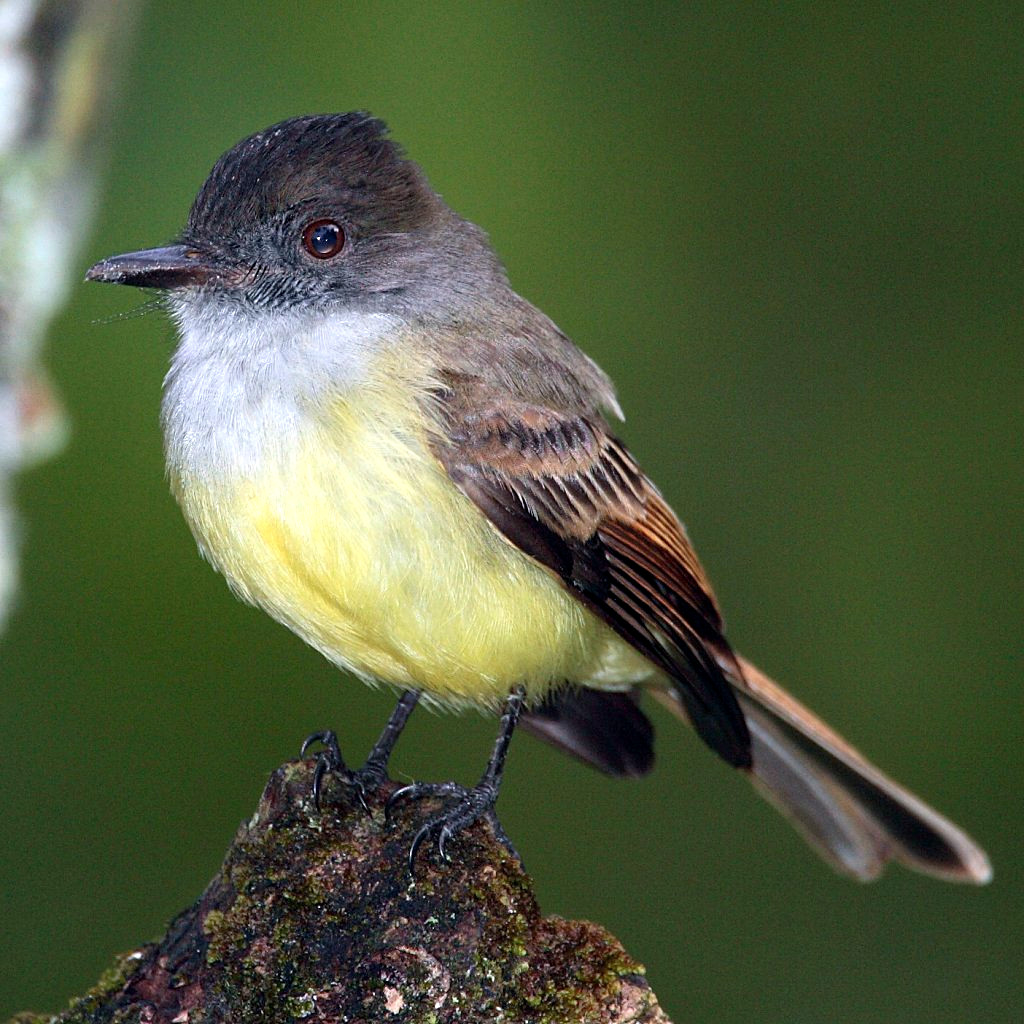
Dusky-capped flycatcher, a fairly common resident in woodlands and forests.

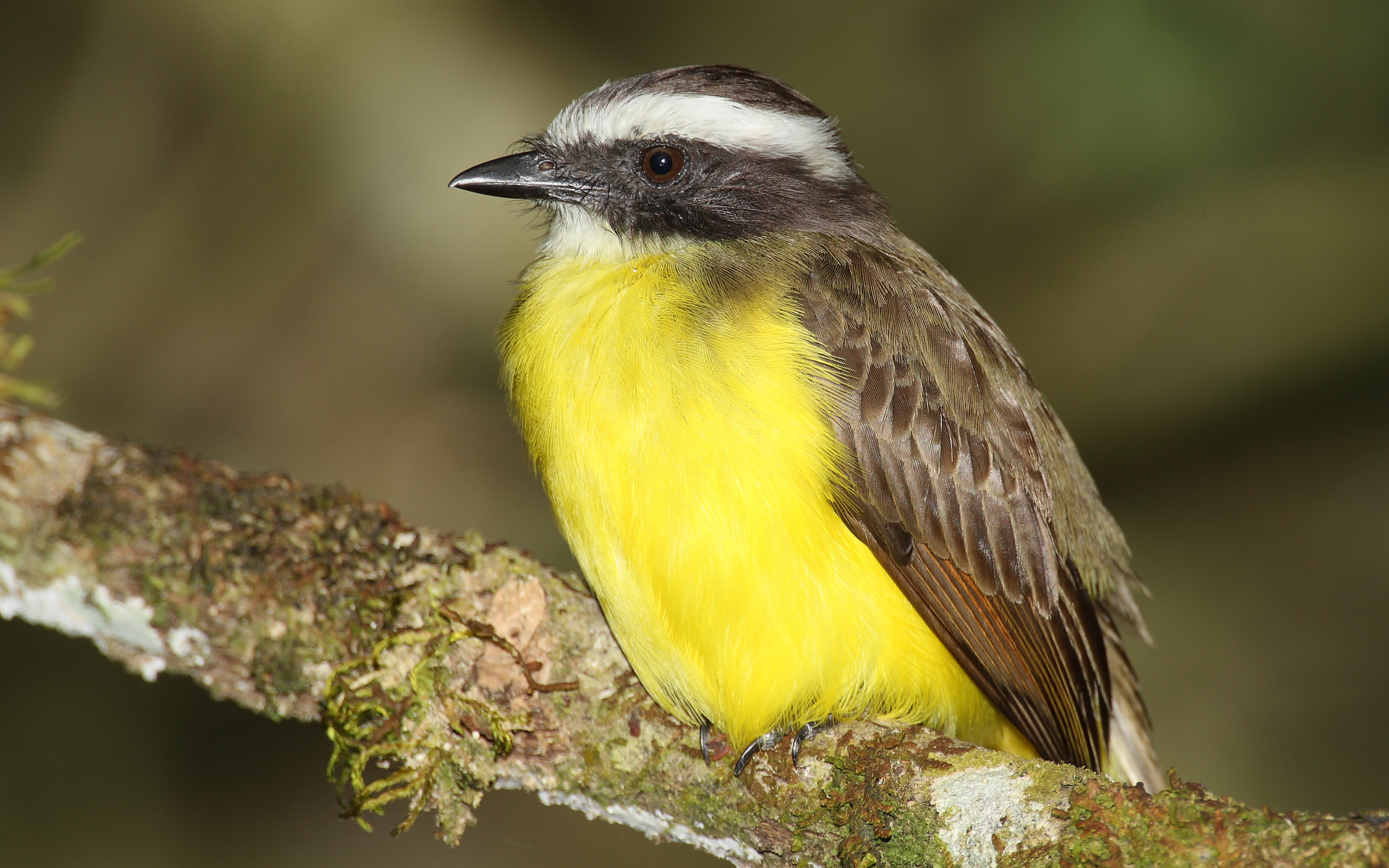
Social flycatcher, Darién. A very common bird, often seen around houses.

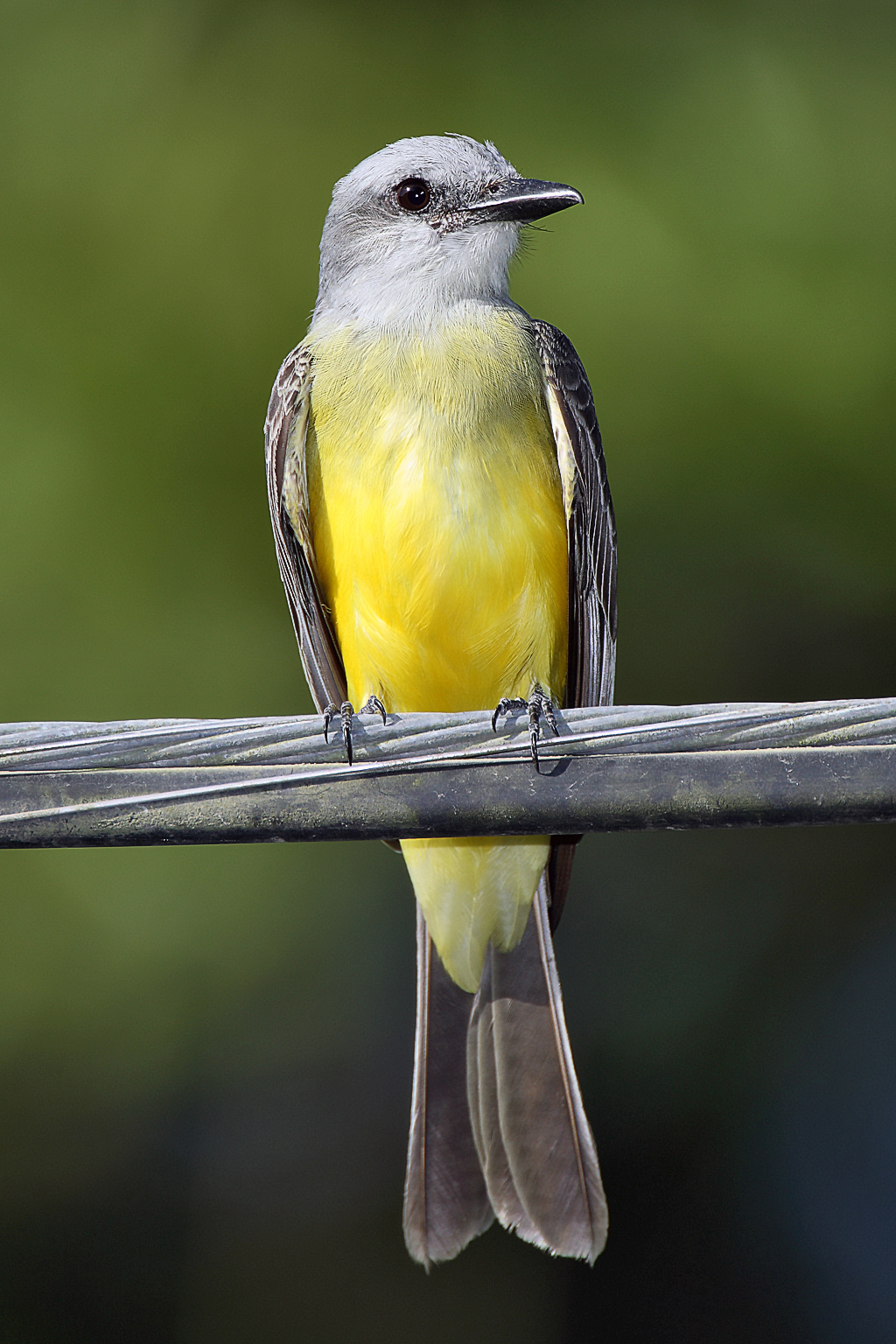
Tropical kingbird, Panama City. One of Panama's commonest and most conspicuous birds.

== Gnateaters ==
Order: Passeriformes Family: Conopophagidae

The members of this small family are found across northern South America and into Central America. They are forest birds, usually seen on the ground or in the low understory.

- Black-crowned antpitta, Pittasoma michleri

== Typical antbirds ==
Order: Passeriformes Family: Thamnophilidae

The antbirds are a large family of small passerine birds of subtropical and tropical Central and South America. They are forest birds which tend to feed on insects at or near the ground. A sizable minority of them specialize in following columns of army ants to eat small invertebrates that leave their hiding places to flee from the ants. Many species lack bright color, with brown, black, and white being the dominant tones.

- Fasciated antshrike, Cymbilaimus lineatus
- Great antshrike, Taraba major
- Barred antshrike, Thamnophilus doliatus
- Black antshrike, Thamnophilus nigriceps
- Black-hooded antshrike, Thamnophilus bridgesi
- Black-crowned antshrike, Thamnophilus atrinucha
- Spiny-faced antshrike, Xenornis setifrons (vulnerable)
- Russet antshrike, Thamnistes anabatinus
- Plain antvireo, Dysithamnus mentalis
- Spot-crowned antvireo, Dysithamnus puncticeps
- Moustached antwren, Myrmotherula ignota
- Pacific antwren, Myrmotherula pacifica
- White-flanked antwren, Myrmotherula axillaris
- Slaty antwren, Myrmotherula schisticolor
- Checker-throated stipplethroat, Epinecrophylla fulviventris
- Rusty-winged antwren, Herpsilochmus frater
- Dot-winged antwren, Microrhopias quixensis
- White-fringed antwren, Formicivora grisea
- Rufous-rumped antwren, Euchrepomis callinota
- Dusky antbird, Cercomacroides tyrannina
- Jet antbird, Cercomacra nigricans
- Bare-crowned antbird, Gymnocichla nudiceps
- White-bellied antbird, Myrmeciza longipes
- Chestnut-backed antbird, Poliocrania exsul
- Dull-mantled antbird, Sipia laemosticta
- Zeledon's antbird, Hafferia zeledoni
- Spotted antbird, Hylophylax naevioides
- Wing-banded antbird, Myrmornis torquata
- Bicolored antbird, Gymnopithys leucaspis
- Ocellated antbird, Phaenostictus mcleannani
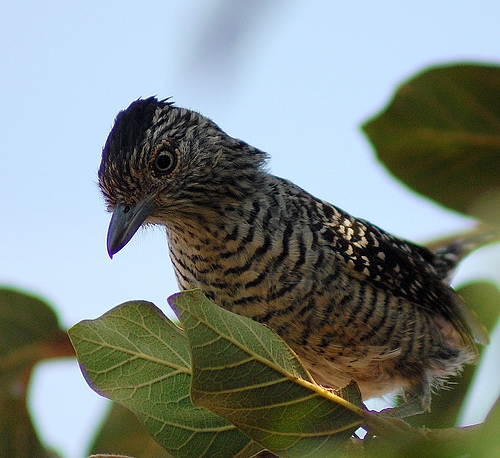
Barred antshrike, seen in pairs low down in thickets and undergrowth.

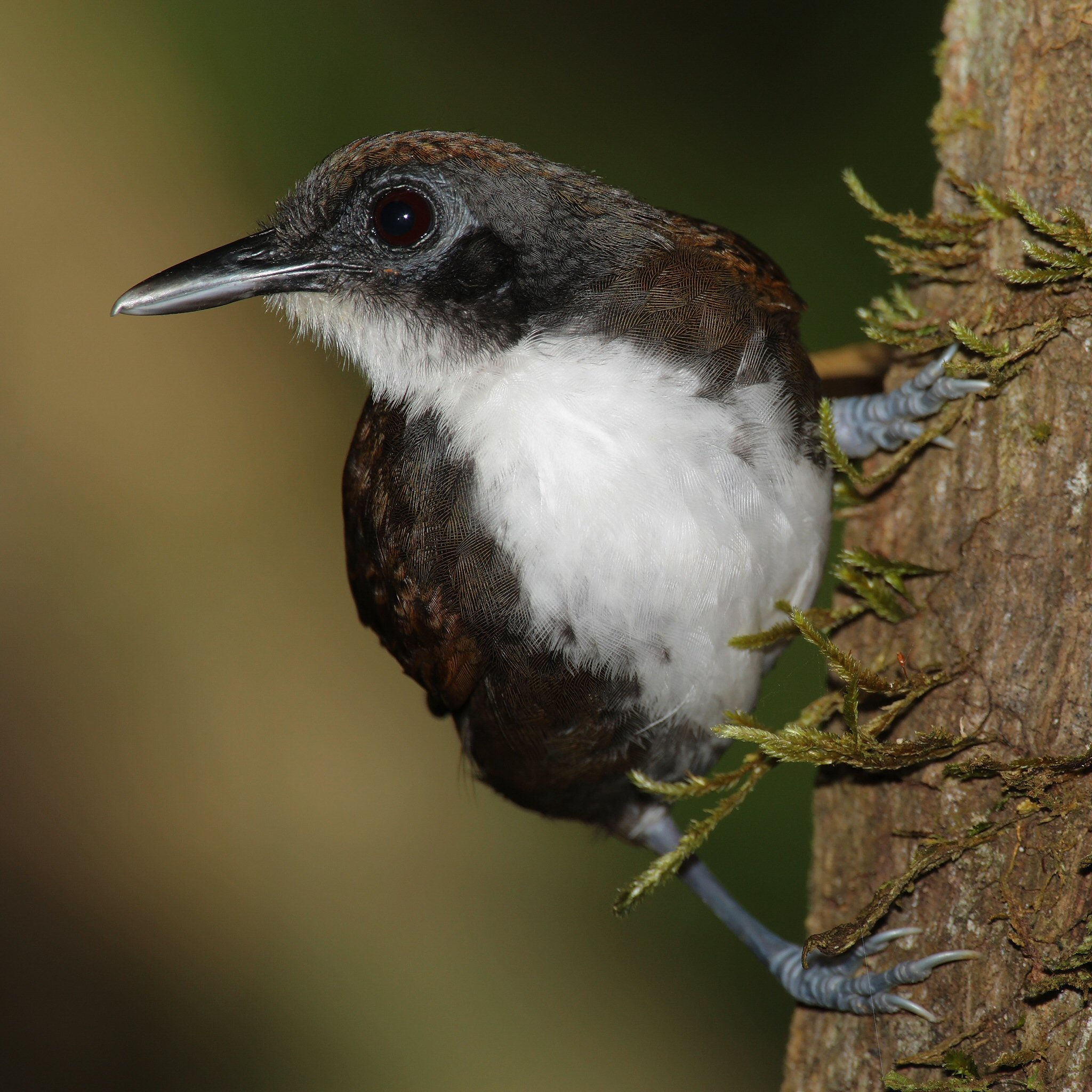
Bicolored antbird, Darién. Usually seen following army ant swarms.

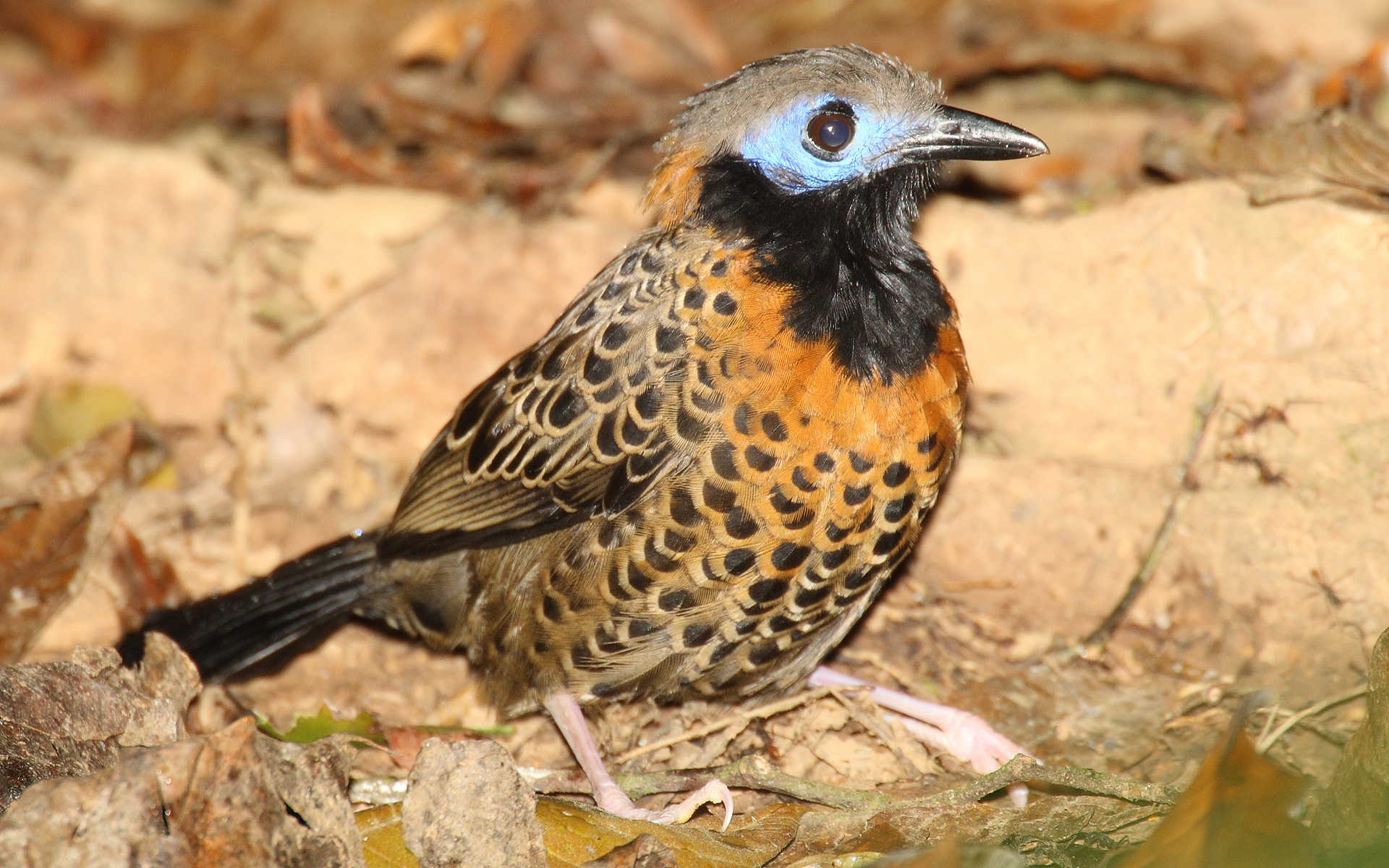
Ocellated antbird, Darién. An uncommon bird of humid forest, mainly in the lowlands.

== Antpittas ==
Order: Passeriformes Family: Grallariidae

Antpittas resemble the true pittas with strong, longish legs, very short tails, and stout bills.

- Scaled antpitta, Grallaria guatimalensis
- Streak-chested antpitta, Hylopezus perspicillatus
- Thicket antpitta, Hylopezus dives
- Ochre-breasted antpitta, Grallaricula flavirostris (near-threatened)

== Tapaculos ==
Order: Passeriformes Family: Rhinocryptidae

The tapaculos are small suboscine passeriform birds with numerous species in South and Central America. They are terrestrial species that fly only poorly on their short wings. They have strong legs, well-suited to their habitat of grassland or forest undergrowth. The tail is cocked and pointed towards the head.

- Tacarcuna tapaculo, Scytalopus panamensis (A) (vulnerable)
- Choco tapaculo, Scytalopus chocoensis
- Silvery-fronted tapaculo, Scytalopus argentifrons

== Antthrushes ==
Order: Passeriformes Family: Formicariidae

Antthrushes resemble small rails with strong, longish legs, very short tails, and stout bills.

- Black-faced antthrush, Formicarius analis
- Black-headed antthrush, Formicarius nigricapillus
- Rufous-breasted antthrush, Formicarius rufipectus

== Ovenbirds and woodcreepers ==
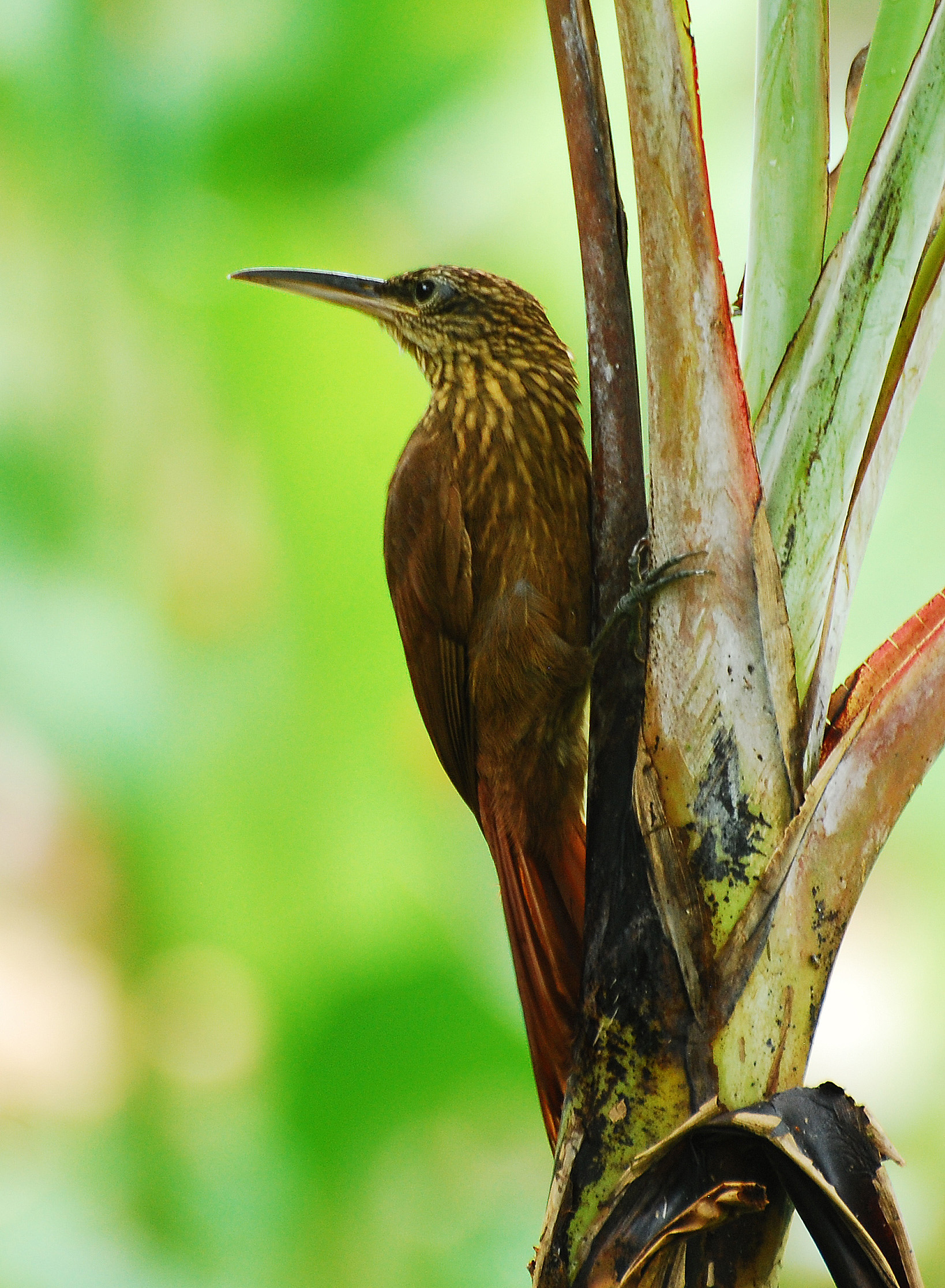
Cocoa woodcreeper, the most common woodcreeper in Panama.

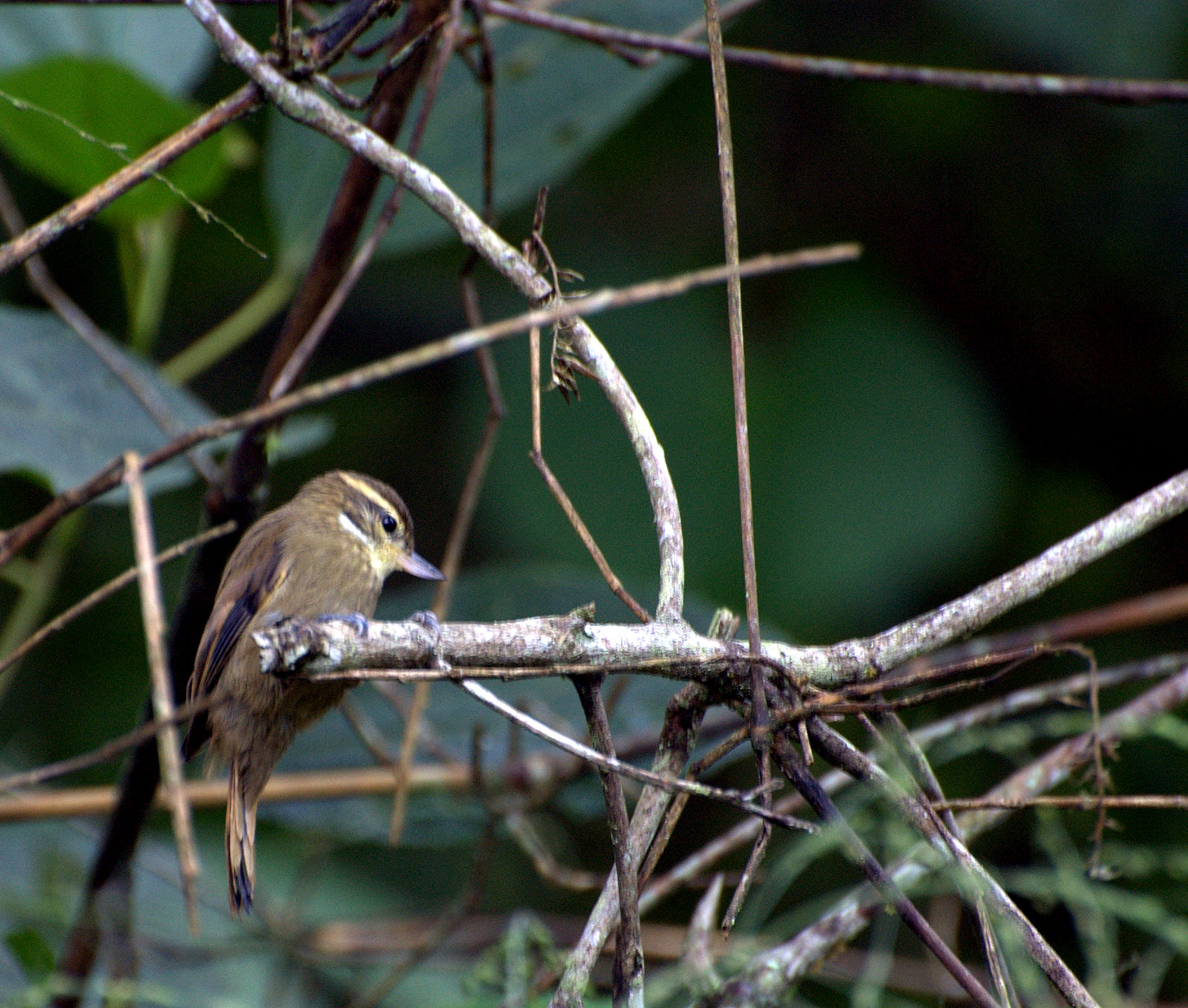
Plain xenops, an active forager in forest and woodland.

Order: Passeriformes Family: Furnariidae

Ovenbirds comprise a large family of small sub-oscine passerine bird species found in Central and South America. They are a diverse group of insectivores which gets its name from the elaborate "oven-like" clay nests built by some species, although others build stick nests or nest in tunnels or clefts in rock. The woodcreepers are brownish birds which maintain an upright vertical posture supported by their stiff tail vanes. They feed mainly on insects taken from tree trunks.

- Middle American leaftosser, Sclerurus mexicanus
- South American leaftosser, Sclerurus obscurior
- Gray-throated leaftosser, Sclerurus albigularis (near-threatened)
- Scaly-throated leaftosser, Sclerurus guatemalensis
- Olivaceous woodcreeper, Sittasomus griseicapillus
- Long-tailed woodcreeper, Deconychura longicauda (near-threatened)
- Ruddy woodcreeper, Dendrocincla homochroa
- Tawny-winged woodcreeper, Dendrocincla anabatina
- Plain-brown woodcreeper, Dendrocincla fuliginosa
- Wedge-billed woodcreeper, Glyphorynchus spirurus
- Northern barred-woodcreeper, Dendrocolaptes sanctithomae
- Black-banded woodcreeper, Dendrocolaptes picumnus
- Strong-billed woodcreeper, Xiphocolaptes promeropirhynchus
- Cocoa woodcreeper, Xiphorhynchus susurrans
- Black-striped woodcreeper, Xiphorhynchus lachrymosus
- Spotted woodcreeper, Xiphorhynchus erythropygius
- Straight-billed woodcreeper, Dendroplex picus
- Red-billed scythebill, Campylorhamphus trochilirostris
- Brown-billed scythebill, Campylorhamphus pusillus
- Streak-headed woodcreeper, Lepidocolaptes souleyetii
- Spot-crowned woodcreeper, Lepidocolaptes affinis
- Plain xenops, Xenops minutus
- Streaked xenops, Xenops rutilans
- Buffy tuftedcheek, Pseudocolaptes lawrencii
- Sharp-tailed streamcreeper, Lochmias nematura
- Slaty-winged foliage-gleaner, Philydor fuscipenne
- Buff-fronted foliage-gleaner, Dendroma rufa
- Scaly-throated foliage-gleaner, Anabacerthia variegaticeps
- Lineated foliage-gleaner, Syndactyla subalaris
- Ruddy foliage-gleaner, Clibanornis rubiginosus
- Streak-breasted treehunter, Thripadectes rufobrunneus
- Buff-throated foliage-gleaner, Automolus ochrolaemus
- Chiriqui foliage-gleaner, Automolus exsertus
- Striped woodhaunter, Automolus subulatus
- Spotted barbtail, Premnoplex brunnescens
- Beautiful treerunner, Margarornis bellulus (E) (near-threatened)
- Ruddy treerunner, Margarornis rubiginosus
- Double-banded graytail, Xenerpestes minlosi
- Red-faced spinetail, Cranioleuca erythrops
- Coiba spinetail, Cranioleuca dissita (E) (near-threatened)
- Pale-breasted spinetail, Synallaxis albescens
- Slaty spinetail, Synallaxis brachyura

== Vireos, shrike-babblers, and erpornis ==
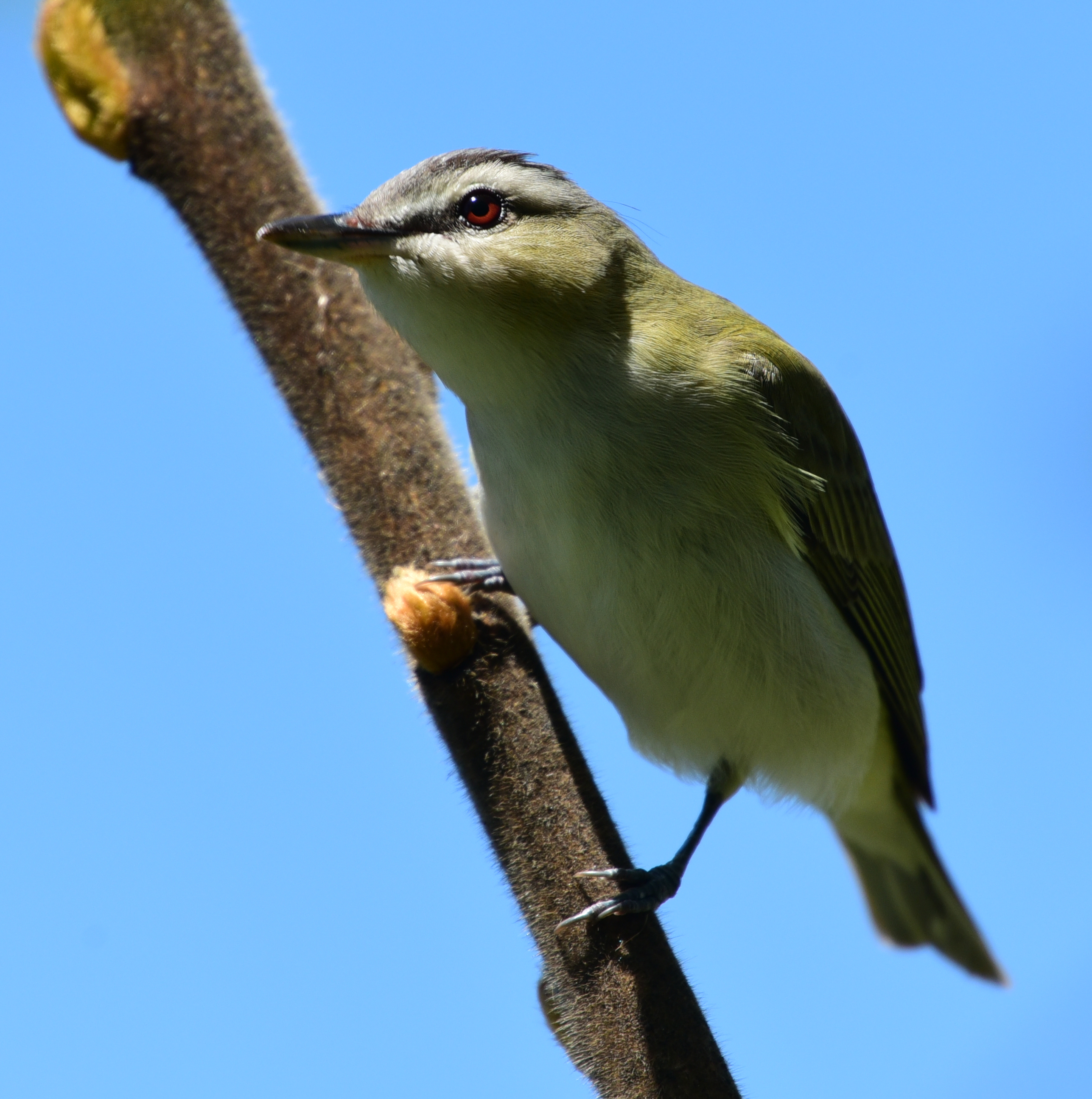
Red-eyed vireo passes through in large numbers on migration.

Order: Passeriformes Family: Vireonidae

The vireos are a group of small to medium-sized passerine birds. They are typically greenish in color and resemble wood warblers apart from their heavier bills.

- Rufous-browed peppershrike, Cyclarhis gujanensis
- Scrub greenlet, Hylophilus flavipes
- Green shrike-vireo, Vireolanius pulchellus
- Yellow-browed shrike-vireo, Vireolanius eximius
- Tawny-crowned greenlet, Hylophilus ochraceiceps
- Lesser greenlet, Hylophilus decurtatus
- Golden-fronted greenlet, Hylophilus aurantiifrons
- White-eyed vireo, Vireo griseus (A)
- Yellow-throated vireo, Vireo flavifrons
- Yellow-winged vireo, Vireo carmioli
- Blue-headed vireo, Vireo solitarius (A)
- Philadelphia vireo, Vireo philadelphicus
- Warbling vireo, Vireo gilvus (A)
- Brown-capped vireo, Vireo leucophrys
- Red-eyed vireo, Vireo olivaceus
- Chivi vireo, Vireo chivi (A)
- Yellow-green vireo, Vireo flavoviridis
- Black-whiskered vireo, Vireo altiloquus (A)

== Crows, jays, and magpies ==
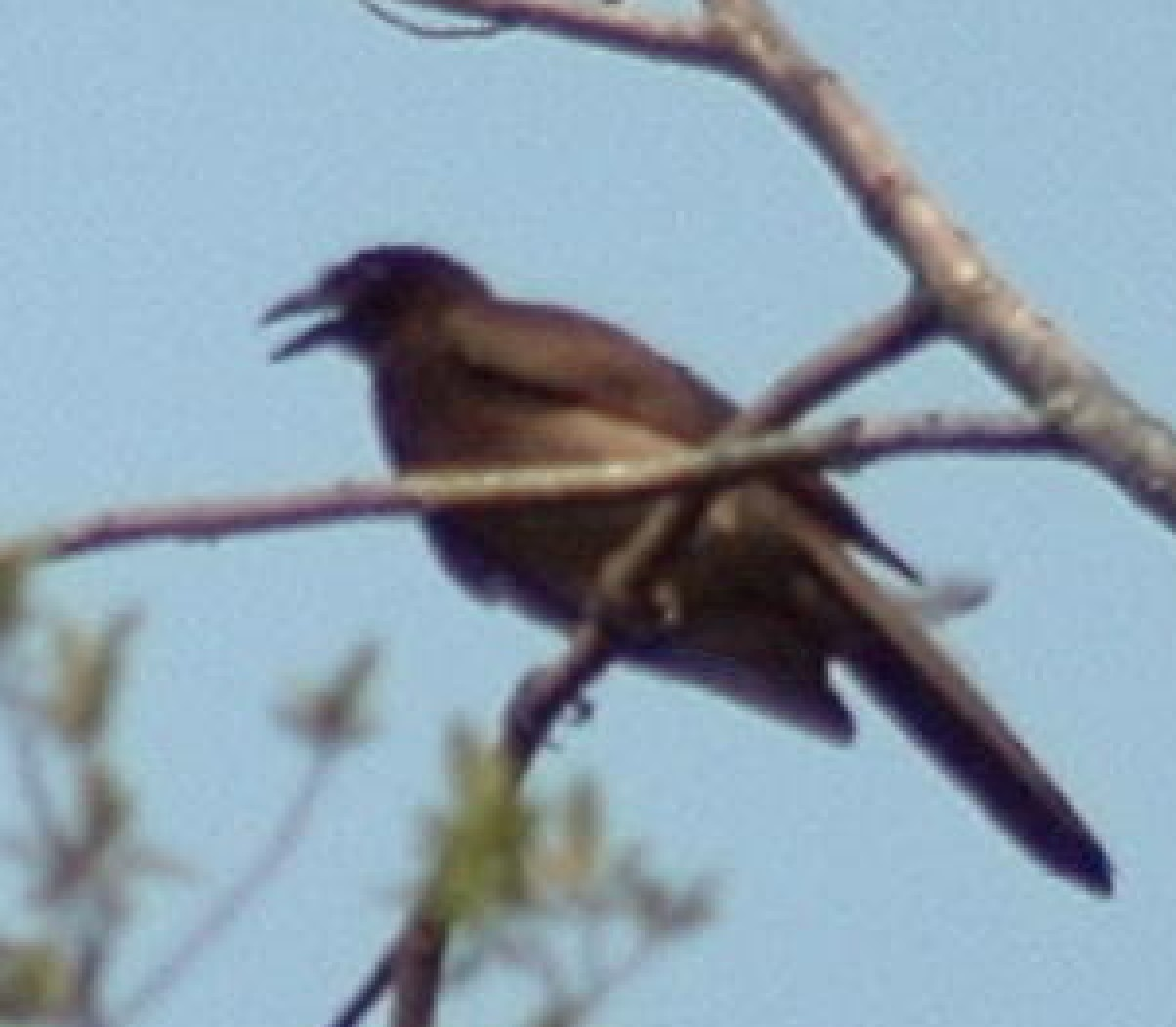
Brown jay is uncommon but conspicuous in north-west Panama.

Order: Passeriformes Family: Corvidae

The family Corvidae includes crows, ravens, jays, choughs, magpies, treepies, nutcrackers, and ground jays. Corvids are above average in size among the Passeriformes, and some of the larger species show high levels of intelligence.

- Silvery-throated jay, Cyanolyca argentigula
- Azure-hooded jay, Cyanolyca cucullata
- White-throated magpie-jay, Calocitta formosa (A)
- Brown jay, Psilorhinus morio
- Black-chested jay, Cyanocorax affinis

== Swallows ==
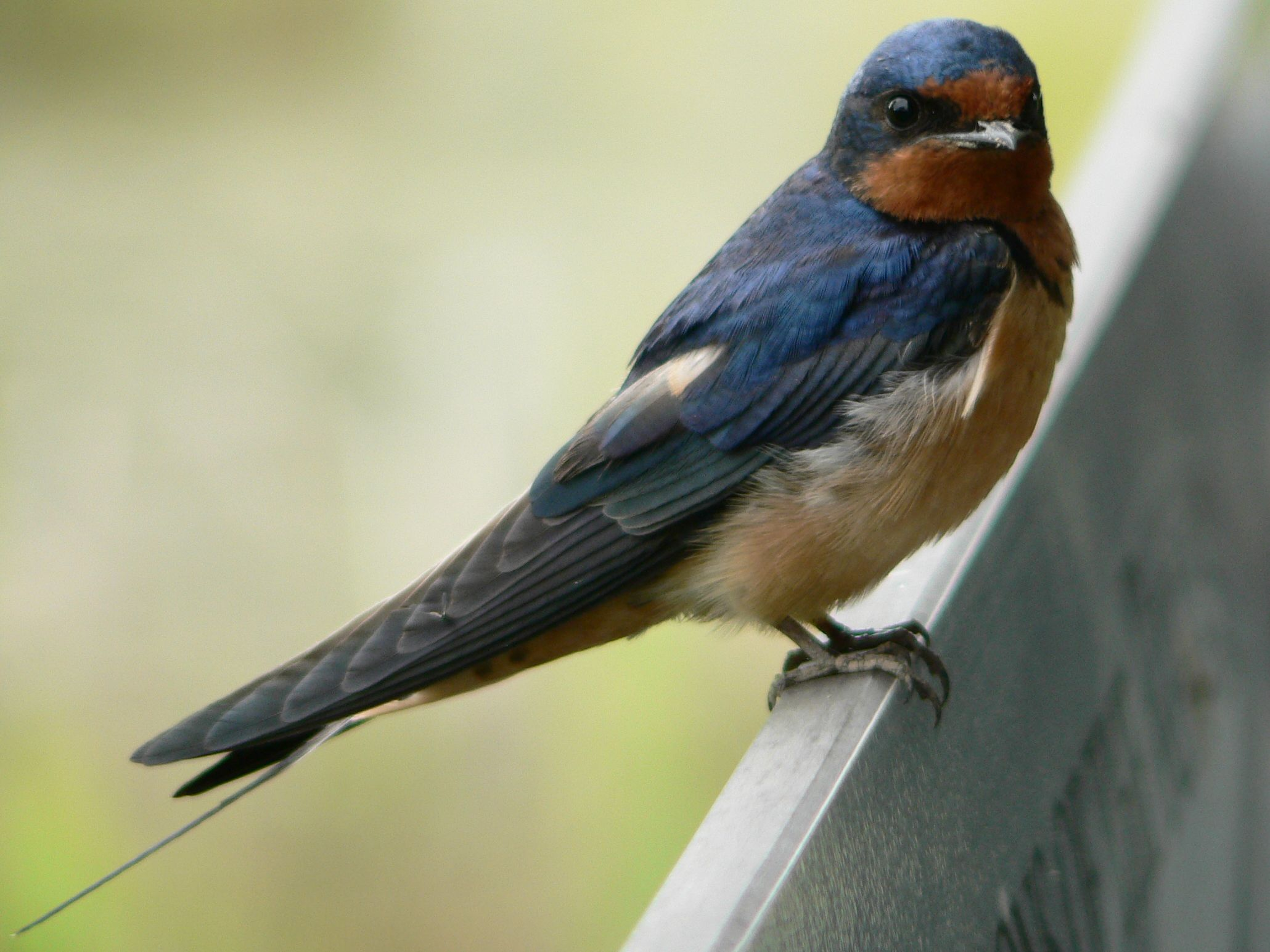
Barn swallow, a common migrant from North America.

Order: Passeriformes Family: Hirundinidae

The family Hirundinidae is adapted to aerial feeding. They have a slender streamlined body, long pointed wings, and a short bill with a wide gape. The feet are adapted to perching rather than walking, and the front toes are partially joined at the base.

- Bank swallow, Riparia riparia
- Tree swallow, Tachycineta bicolor (A)
- White-winged swallow, Tachycineta albiventer (A) (not on the AOS Check-list)
- Violet-green swallow, Tachycineta thalassina (A)
- Mangrove swallow, Tachycineta albilinea
- White-thighed swallow, Atticora tibialis
- Blue-and-white swallow, Pygochelidon cyanoleuca
- Northern rough-winged swallow, Stelgidopteryx serripennis
- Southern rough-winged swallow, Stelgidopteryx ruficollis
- Brown-chested martin, Progne tapera
- Purple martin, Progne subis
- Southern martin, Progne elegans (A)
- Gray-breasted martin, Progne chalybea
- Barn swallow, Hirundo rustica
- Cliff swallow, Petrochelidon pyrrhonota
- Cave swallow, Petrochelidon fulva (A)

== Waxwings ==
Order: Passeriformes Family: Bombycillidae

The waxwings are a group of birds with soft silky plumage and unique red tips to some of the wing feathers. In the Bohemian and cedar waxwings, these tips look like sealing wax and give the group its name. These are arboreal birds of northern forests. They live on insects in summer and berries in winter.

- Cedar waxwing, Bombycilla cedrorum (A)

== Silky-flycatchers ==
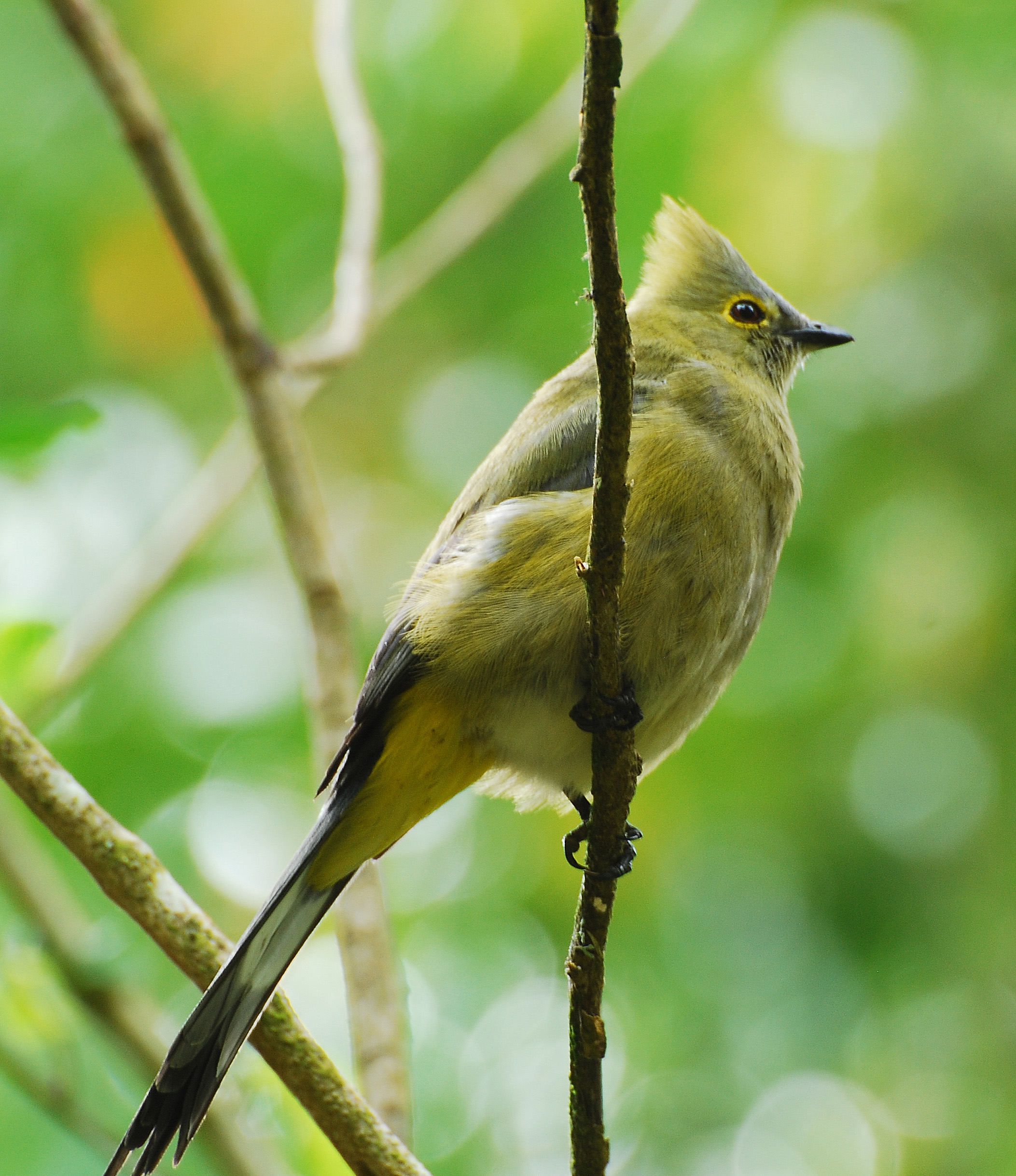
Long-tailed silky-flycatcher, found in small groups in the western highlands.

Order: Passeriformes Family: Ptiliogonatidae

The silky-flycatchers are a small family of passerine birds which occur mainly in Central America, although the range of one species extends to central California. They are related to waxwings and like that group have soft silky plumage, usually gray or pale yellow. They have small crests.

- Black-and-yellow silky-flycatcher, Phainoptila melanoxantha
- Long-tailed silky-flycatcher, Ptiliogonys caudatus

== Gnatcatchers ==
Order: Passeriformes Family: Polioptilidae

These dainty birds resemble Old World warblers in their build and habits, moving restlessly through the foliage seeking insects. The gnatcatchers and gnatwrens are mainly soft bluish gray in color and have the typical insectivore's long sharp bill. They are birds of fairly open woodland or scrub, which nest in bushes or trees.

- Long-billed gnatwren, Ramphocaenus melanurus
- Tawny-faced gnatwren, Microbates cinereiventris
- Slate-throated gnatcatcher, Polioptila schistaceigula
- White-browed gnatcatcher, Polioptila bilineata

== Wrens ==
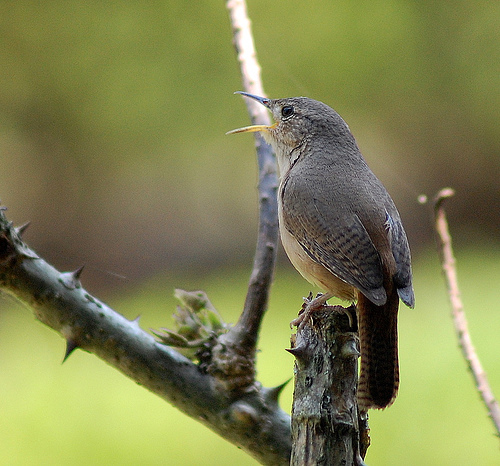
House wren is common around settlements and often nests on buildings.

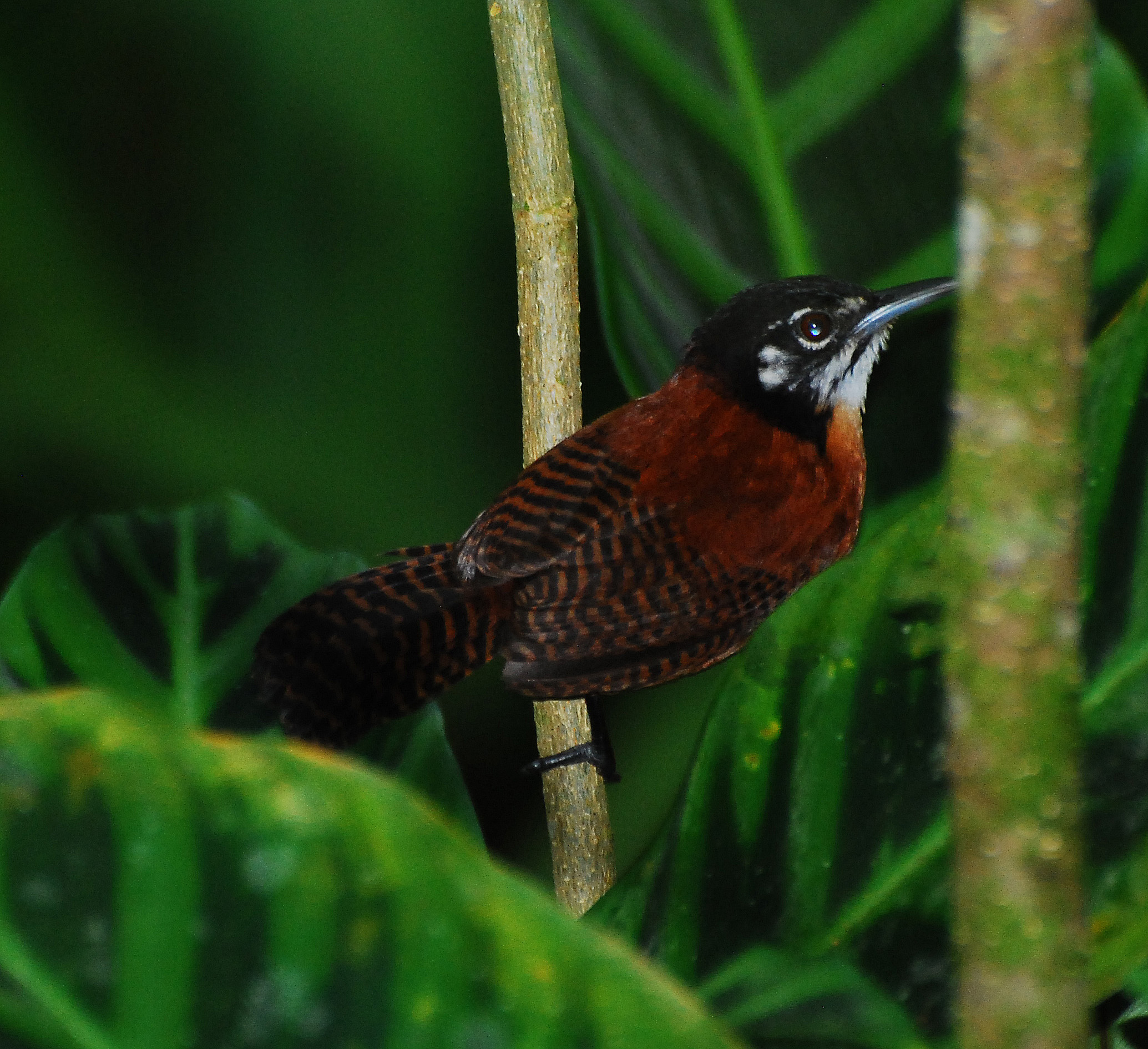
Bay wren, a noisy bird of dense undergrowth.

Order: Passeriformes Family: Troglodytidae

The wrens are mainly small and inconspicuous except for their loud songs. These birds have short wings and thin down-turned bills. Several species often hold their tails upright. All are insectivorous.

- Scaly-breasted wren, Microcerculus marginatus
- House wren, Troglodytes aedon
- Ochraceous wren, Troglodytes ochraceus
- Timberline wren, Thryorchilus browni
- Grass wren, Cistothorus platensis (A)
- White-headed wren, Campylorhynchus albobrunneus
- Band-backed wren, Campylorhynchus zonatus
- Bicolored wren, Campylorhynchus griseus (A)
- Sooty-headed wren, Pheugopedius spadix
- Black-throated wren, Pheugopedius atrogularis
- Rufous-breasted wren, Pheugopedius rutilus
- Black-bellied wren, Pheugopedius fasciatoventris
- Rufous-and-white wren, Thryophilus rufalbus
- Stripe-throated wren, Cantorchilus leucopogon
- Stripe-breasted wren, Cantorchilus thoracicus
- Canebrake wren, Cantorchilus zeledoni
- Isthmian wren, Cantorchilus elutus
- Bay wren, Cantorchilus nigricapillus
- Riverside wren, Cantorchilus semibadius
- Buff-breasted wren, Cantorchilus leucotis
- White-breasted wood-wren, Henicorhina leucosticta
- Gray-breasted wood-wren, Henicorhina leucophrys
- Song wren, Cyphorhinus phaeocephalus

== Mockingbirds and thrashers ==
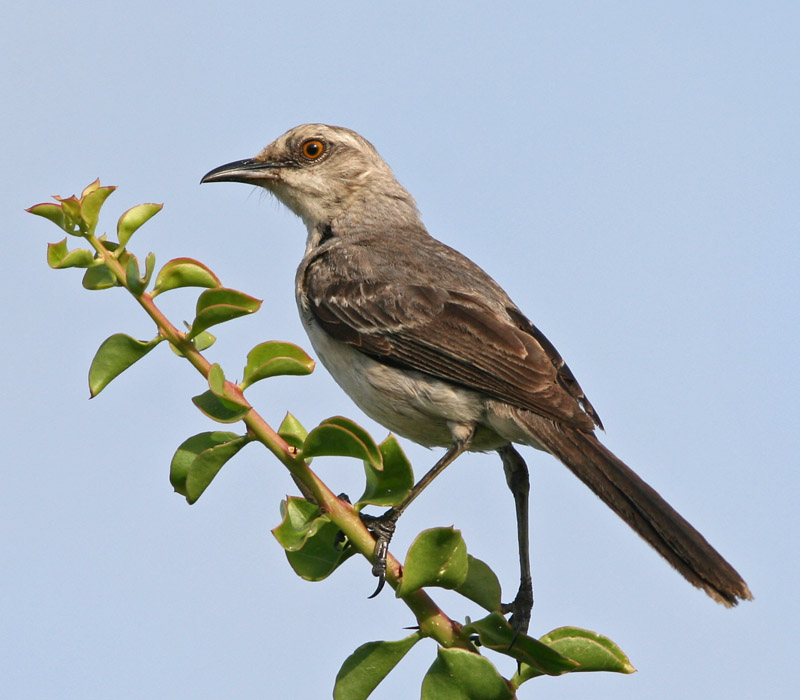
Tropical mockingbird, first recorded in 1932 and now common in central Panama.

Order: Passeriformes Family: Mimidae

The mimids are a family of passerine birds that includes thrashers, mockingbirds, tremblers, and the New World catbirds. These birds are notable for their vocalizations, especially their ability to mimic a wide variety of birds and other sounds heard outdoors. Their coloring tends towards dull-grays and browns.

- Gray catbird, Dumetella carolinensis
- Tropical mockingbird, Mimus gilvus

== Starlings ==
Order: Passeriformes Family: Sturnidae

Starlings are small to medium-sized passerine birds. Their flight is strong and direct and they are very gregarious. Their preferred habitat is fairly open country. They eat insects and fruit. Plumage is typically dark with a metallic sheen.

- European starling, Sturnus vulgaris (I) (A)

== Dippers ==
Order: Passeriformes Family: Cinclidae

Dippers are a group of perching birds whose habitat includes aquatic environments in the Americas, Europe, and Asia. They are named for their bobbing or dipping movements.

- American dipper, Cinclus mexicanus

== Donacobius ==
Order: Passeriformes Family: Donacobiidae

The black-capped donacobius is found in wet habitats from Panama across northern South America and east of the Andes to Argentina and Paraguay.

- Black-capped donacobius, Donacobius atricapilla

== Thrushes and allies ==
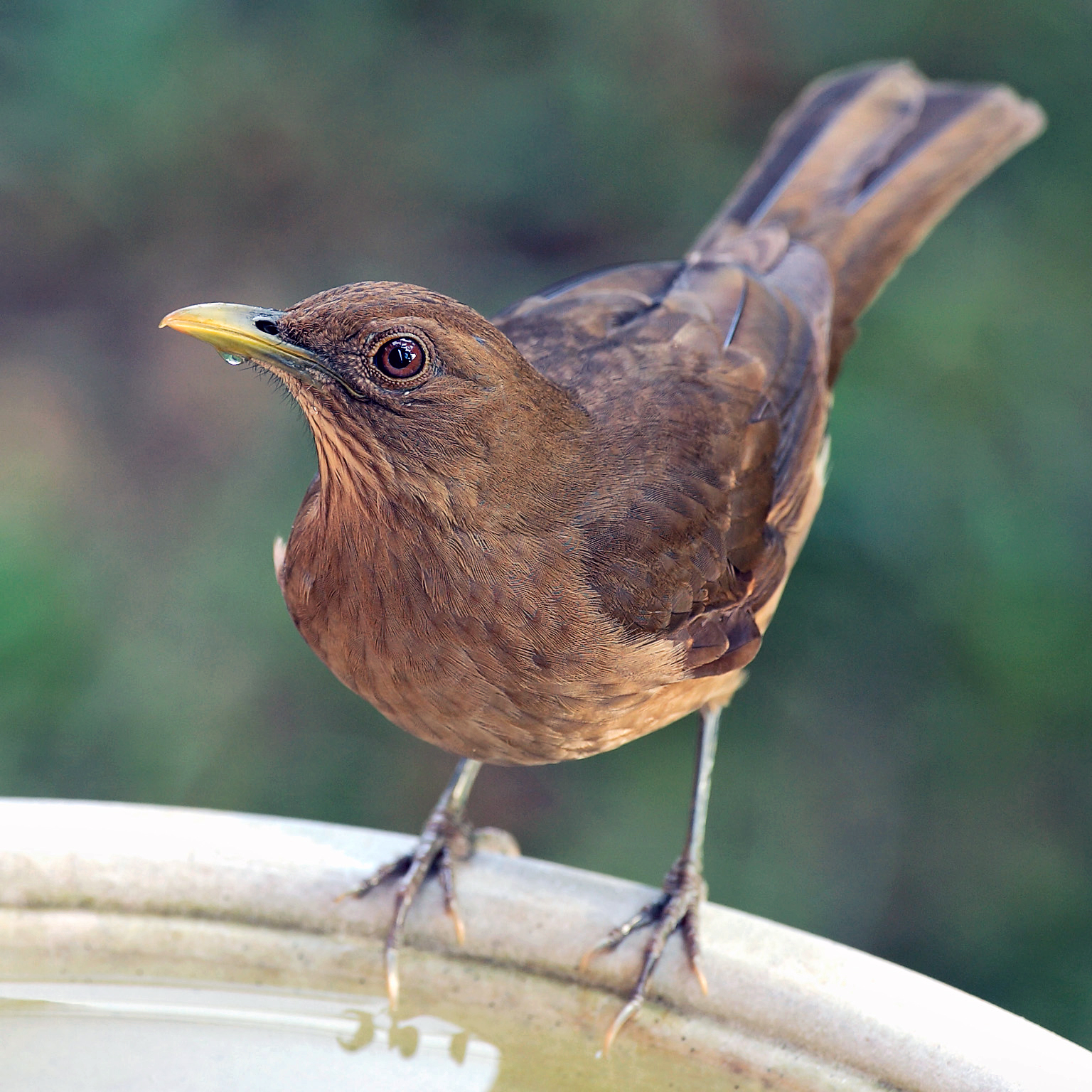
Clay-colored thrush, Panama City. A common bird which is often seen in gardens.

Order: Passeriformes Family: Turdidae

The thrushes are a group of passerine birds that occur mainly in the Old World. They are plump, soft plumaged, small to medium-sized insectivores or sometimes omnivores, often feeding on the ground. Many have attractive songs.

- Black-faced solitaire, Myadestes melanops
- Varied solitaire, Myadestes coloratus
- Black-billed nightingale-thrush, Catharus gracilirostris
- Orange-billed nightingale-thrush, Catharus aurantiirostris
- Slaty-backed nightingale-thrush, Catharus fuscater
- Ruddy-capped nightingale-thrush, Catharus frantzii
- Black-headed nightingale-thrush, Catharus mexicanus
- Veery, Catharus fuscescens
- Gray-cheeked thrush, Catharus minimus
- Swainson's thrush, Catharus ustulatus
- Wood thrush, Hylocichla mustelina (near-threatened)
- Sooty thrush, Turdus nigrescens
- Mountain thrush, Turdus plebejus
- Pale-vented thrush, Turdus obsoletus
- Clay-colored thrush, Turdus grayi
- White-throated thrush, Turdus assimilis

== Old World flycatchers ==
Order: Passeriformes Family: Muscicapidae

Old World flycatchers are a large group of small passerine birds native to the Old World. They are mainly small arboreal insectivores. The appearance of these birds is highly varied, but they mostly have weak songs and harsh calls.

- Northern wheatear, Oenanthe oenanthe (A)

== Waxbills and allies ==
Order: Passeriformes Family: Estrildidae

The estrildid finches are small passerine birds of the Old World tropics and Australasia. They are gregarious and often colonial seed eaters with short thick but pointed bills. They are all similar in structure and habits, but have wide variation in plumage colors and patterns.

- Tricolored munia, Lonchura malacca (I) (A)

== Old World sparrows ==
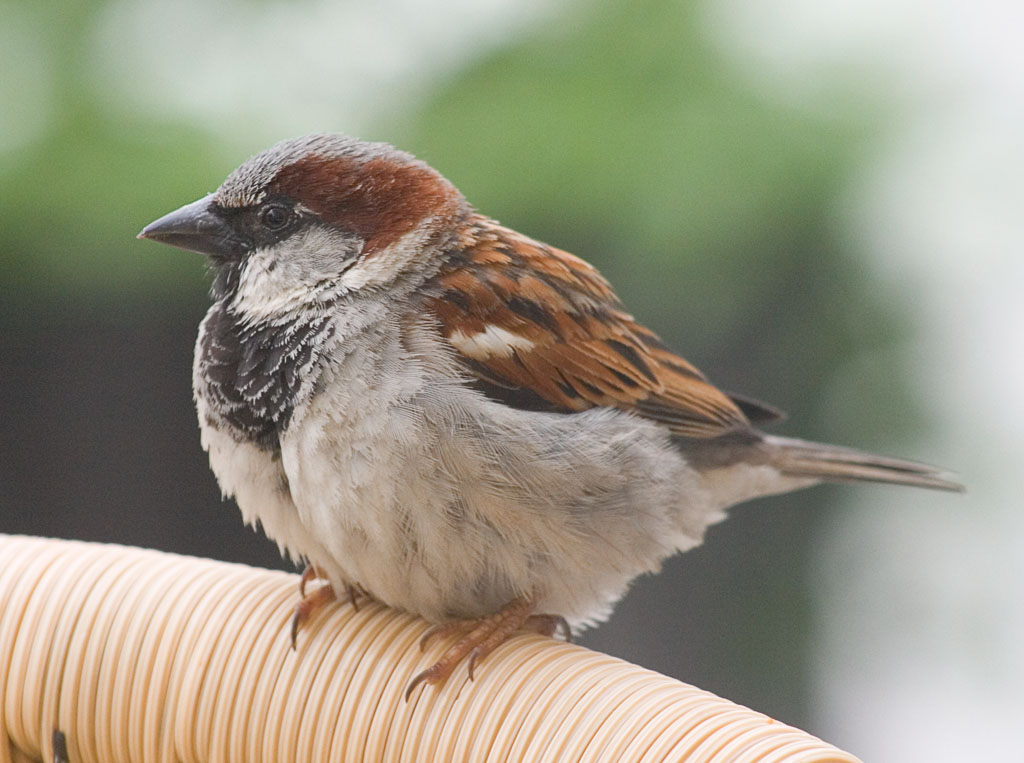
House sparrow, a bird of urban areas which was first recorded in 1976.

Order: Passeriformes Family: Passeridae

Sparrows are small passerine birds. In general, sparrows tend to be small, plump, brown or gray birds with short tails and short powerful beaks. Sparrows are seed eaters, but they also consume small insects.

- House sparrow, Passer domesticus (I)

== Wagtails and pipits ==
Order: Passeriformes Family: Motacillidae

Motacillidae is a family of small passerine birds with medium to long tails. They include the wagtails, longclaws, and pipits. They are slender ground-feeding insectivores of open country.

- Yellowish pipit, Anthus chii

== Finches, euphonias, and allies ==
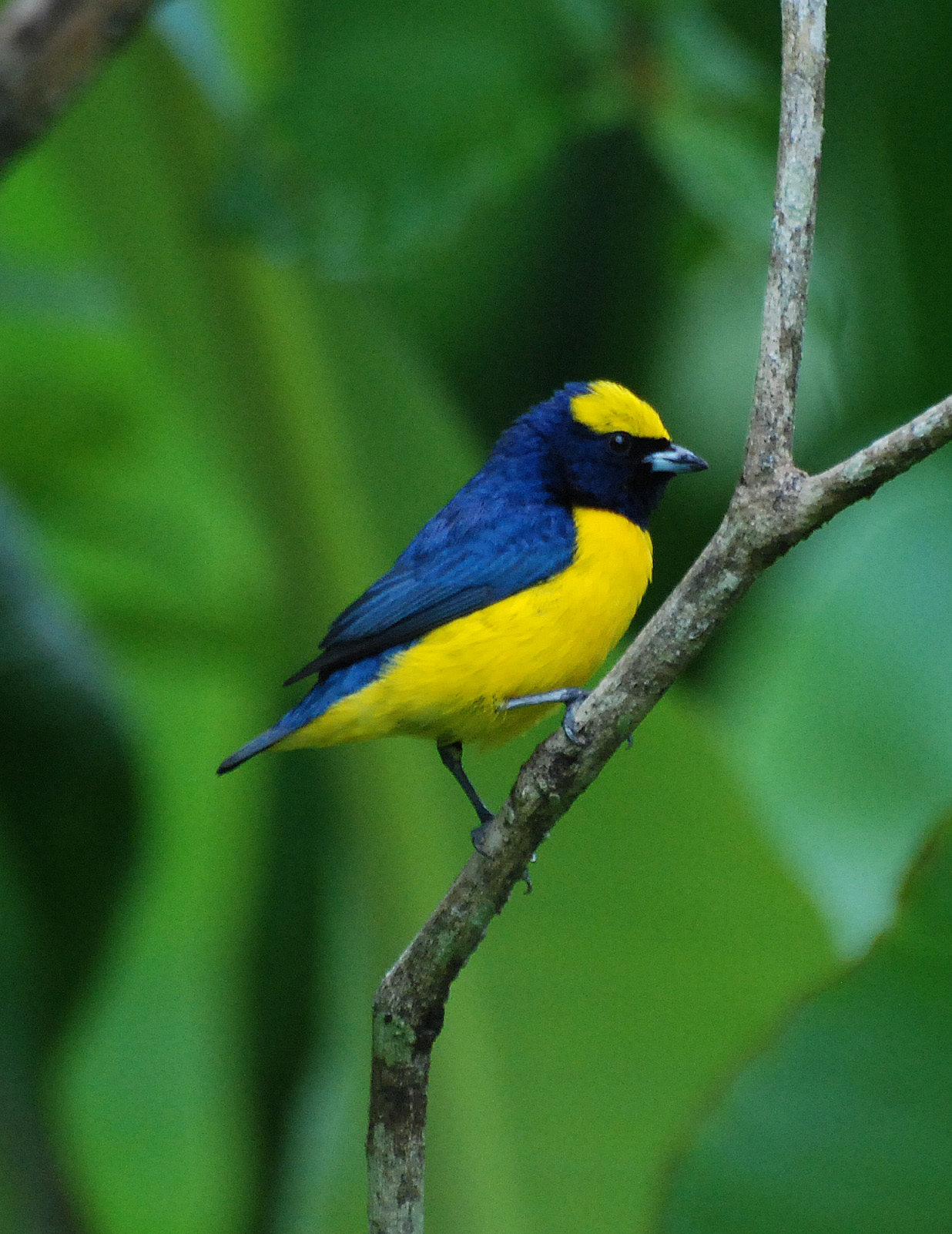
Yellow-crowned euphonia, seen in flocks in scrub, savannah and woodland clearings.

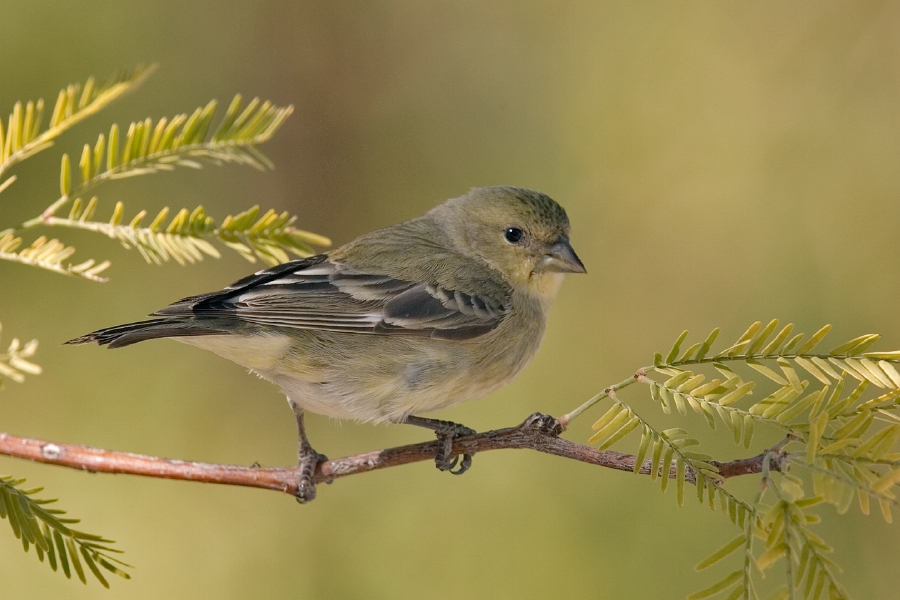
Female lesser goldfinch, a local resident of fairly open country.

Order: Passeriformes Family: Fringillidae

Finches are seed-eating passerine birds, that are small to moderately large and have a strong beak, usually conical and in some species very large. All have twelve tail feathers and nine primaries. These birds have a bouncing flight with alternating bouts of flapping and gliding on closed wings, and most sing well.

- Elegant euphonia, Chlorophonia elegantissima
- Yellow-collared chlorophonia, Chlorophonia flavirostris (A)
- Golden-browed chlorophonia, Chlorophonia callophrys
- Yellow-crowned euphonia, Euphonia luteicapilla
- White-vented euphonia, Euphonia minuta
- Yellow-throated euphonia, Euphonia hirundinacea (A)
- Thick-billed euphonia, Euphonia laniirostris
- Spot-crowned euphonia, Euphonia imitans
- Olive-backed euphonia, Euphonia gouldi
- Fulvous-vented euphonia, Euphonia fulvicrissa
- Tawny-capped euphonia, Euphonia anneae
- Orange-bellied euphonia, Euphonia xanthogaster
- Lesser goldfinch, Spinus psaltria
- Yellow-bellied siskin, Spinus xanthogastrus

== Thrush-tanager ==
Order: Passeriformes Family: Rhodinocichlidae

This species was historically placed in family Thraupidae. It was placed in its own family in 2017.

- Rosy thrush-tanager, Rhodinocichla rosea

== New World sparrows ==
Order: Passeriformes Family: Passerellidae

Until 2017, these species were considered part of the family Emberizidae. Most of the species are known as sparrows, but these birds are not closely related to the Old World sparrows which are in the family Passeridae. Many of these have distinctive head patterns.

- Yellow-throated chlorospingus, Chlorospingus flavigularis
- Ashy-throated chlorospingus, Chlorospingus canigularis
- Sooty-capped chlorospingus, Chlorospingus pileatus
- Common chlorospingus, Chlorospingus flavopectus
- Tacarcuna chlorospingus, Chlorospingus tacarcunae
- Pirre chlorospingus, Chlorospingus inornatus (E)
- Grasshopper sparrow, Ammodramus savannarum
- Black-striped sparrow, Arremonops conirostris
- Lark sparrow, Chondestes grammacus (A)
- Chipping sparrow, Spizella passerina (A)
- Clay-colored sparrow, Spizella pallida (A)
- Costa Rican brushfinch, Arremon costaricensis
- Black-headed brushfinch, Arremon atricapillus
- Orange-billed sparrow, Arremon aurantiirostris
- Chestnut-capped brushfinch, Arremon brunneinucha
- Sooty-faced finch, Lysurus crassirostris
- Volcano junco, Junco vulcani
- Rufous-collared sparrow, Zonotrichia capensis
- Lincoln's sparrow, Melospiza lincolnii (A)
- Large-footed finch, Pezopetes capitalis
- White-naped brushfinch, Atlapetes albinucha
- Yellow-thighed brushfinch, Atlapetes tibialis
- Yellow-green brushfinch, Atlapetes luteoviridis (E) (vulnerable)

== Wrenthrush ==
Order: Passeriformes Family: Zeledoniidae

Despite its name, this species is neither a wren nor a thrush, and is not closely related to either family. It was moved from the wood-warblers (Parulidae) and placed in its own family in 2017.

- Wrenthrush, Zeledonia coronata

== Yellow-breasted chat ==
Order: Passeriformes Family: Icteriidae

This species was historically placed in the wood-warblers but nonetheless most authorities were unsure if it belonged there. It was placed in its own family in 2017.

- Yellow-breasted chat, Icteria virens (A)

== Troupials and allies ==
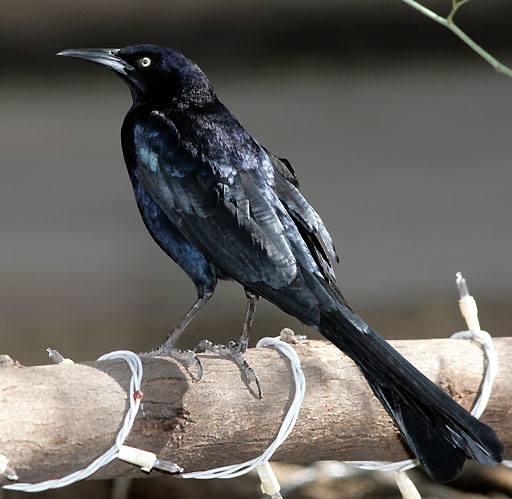
Great-tailed grackle has become very common around Panama City and the former Canal Zone.

Order: Passeriformes Family: Icteridae

The icterids are a group of small to medium-sized, often colorful, passerine birds restricted to the New World and include the grackles, New World blackbirds, and New World orioles. Most species have black as the predominant plumage color, often enlivened by yellow, orange, or red.

- Yellow-headed blackbird, Xanthocephalus xanthocephalus (A)
- Bobolink, Dolichonyx oryzivorus
- Eastern meadowlark, Sturnella magna (near-threatened)
- Red-breasted meadowlark, Leistes militaris
- Yellow-billed cacique, Amblycercus holosericeus
- Crested oropendola, Psarocolius decumanus
- Chestnut-headed oropendola, Psarocolius wagleri
- Montezuma oropendola, Psarocolius montezuma
- Black oropendola, Psarocolius guatimozinus
- Scarlet-rumped cacique, Cacicus uropygialis
- Yellow-rumped cacique, Cacicus cela
- Black-cowled oriole, Icterus prosthemelas
- Orchard oriole, Icterus spurius
- Yellow-backed oriole, Icterus chrysater
- Orange-crowned oriole, Icterus auricapillus
- Yellow-tailed oriole, Icterus mesomelas
- Baltimore oriole, Icterus galbula
- Red-winged blackbird, Agelaius phoeniceus (A)
- Shiny cowbird, Molothrus bonariensis
- Bronzed cowbird, Molothrus aeneus
- Brown-headed cowbird, Molothrus ater (A)
- Giant cowbird, Molothrus oryzivorus
- Melodious blackbird, Dives dives (A)`
- Great-tailed grackle, Quiscalus mexicanus
- Carib grackle, Quiscalus lugubris (A)
- Yellow-hooded blackbird, Chrysomus icterocephalus (A)

== New World warblers ==
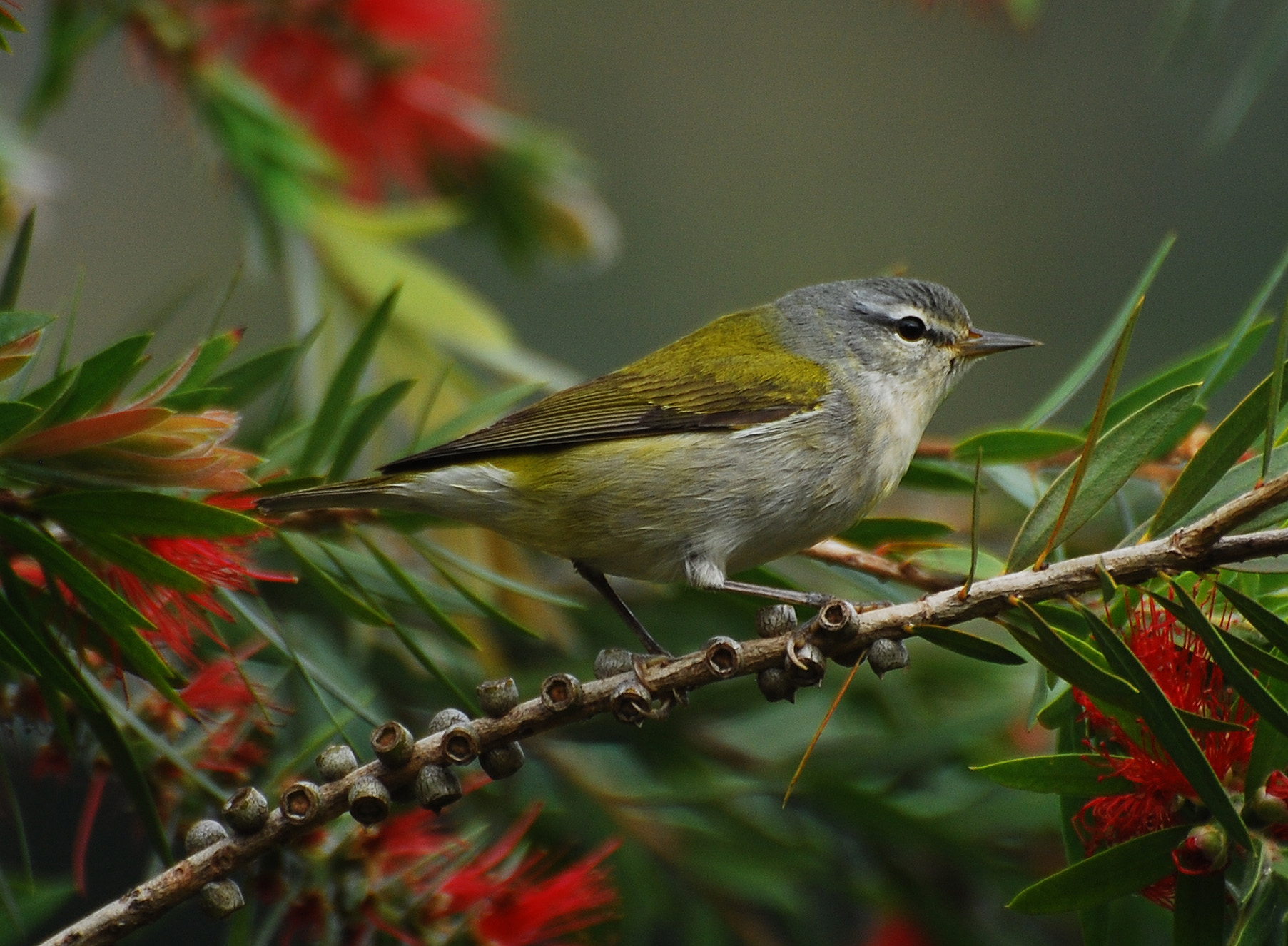
Tennessee warbler, a winter visitor in large numbers.

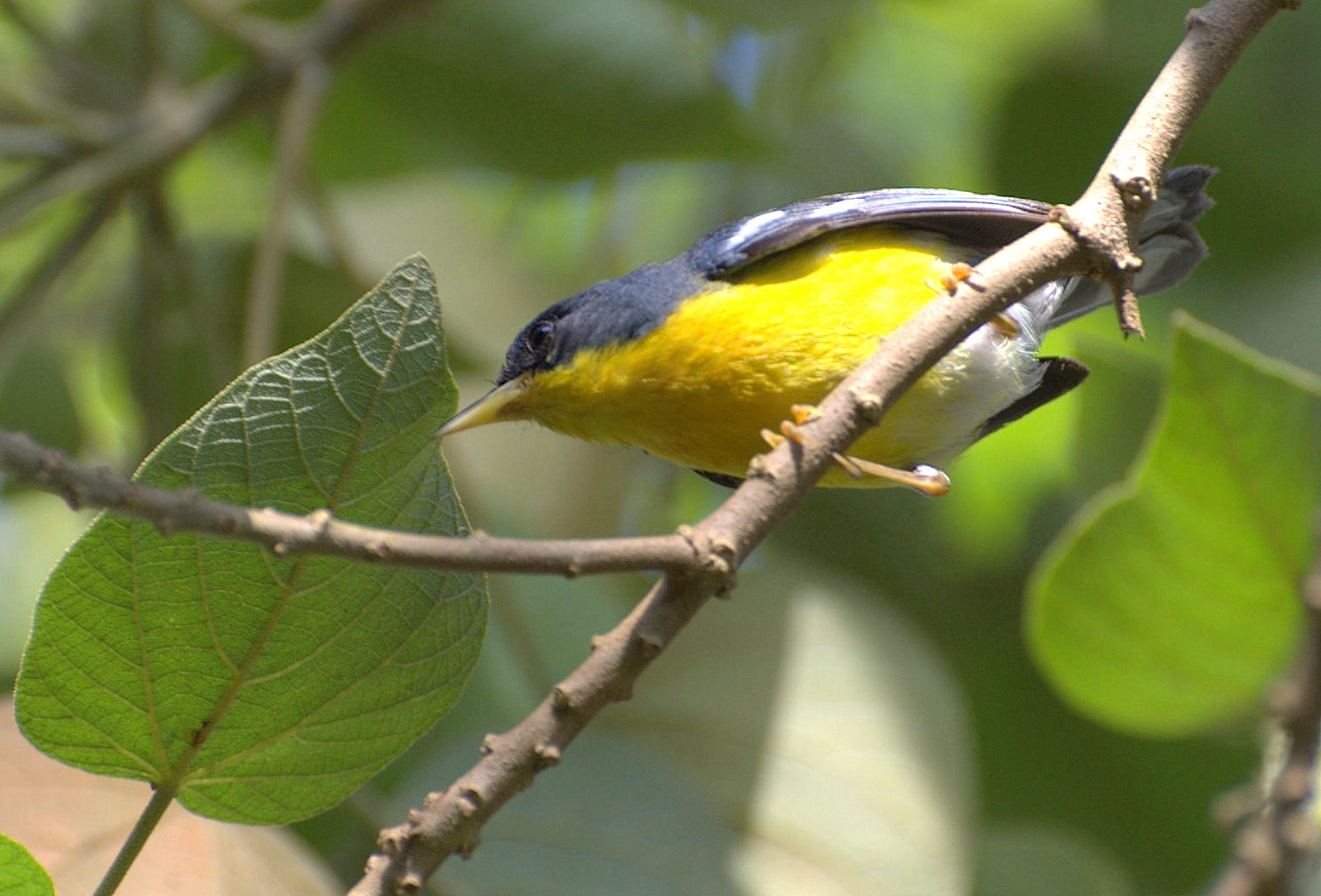
Tropical parula, resident locally in forest and woodland.

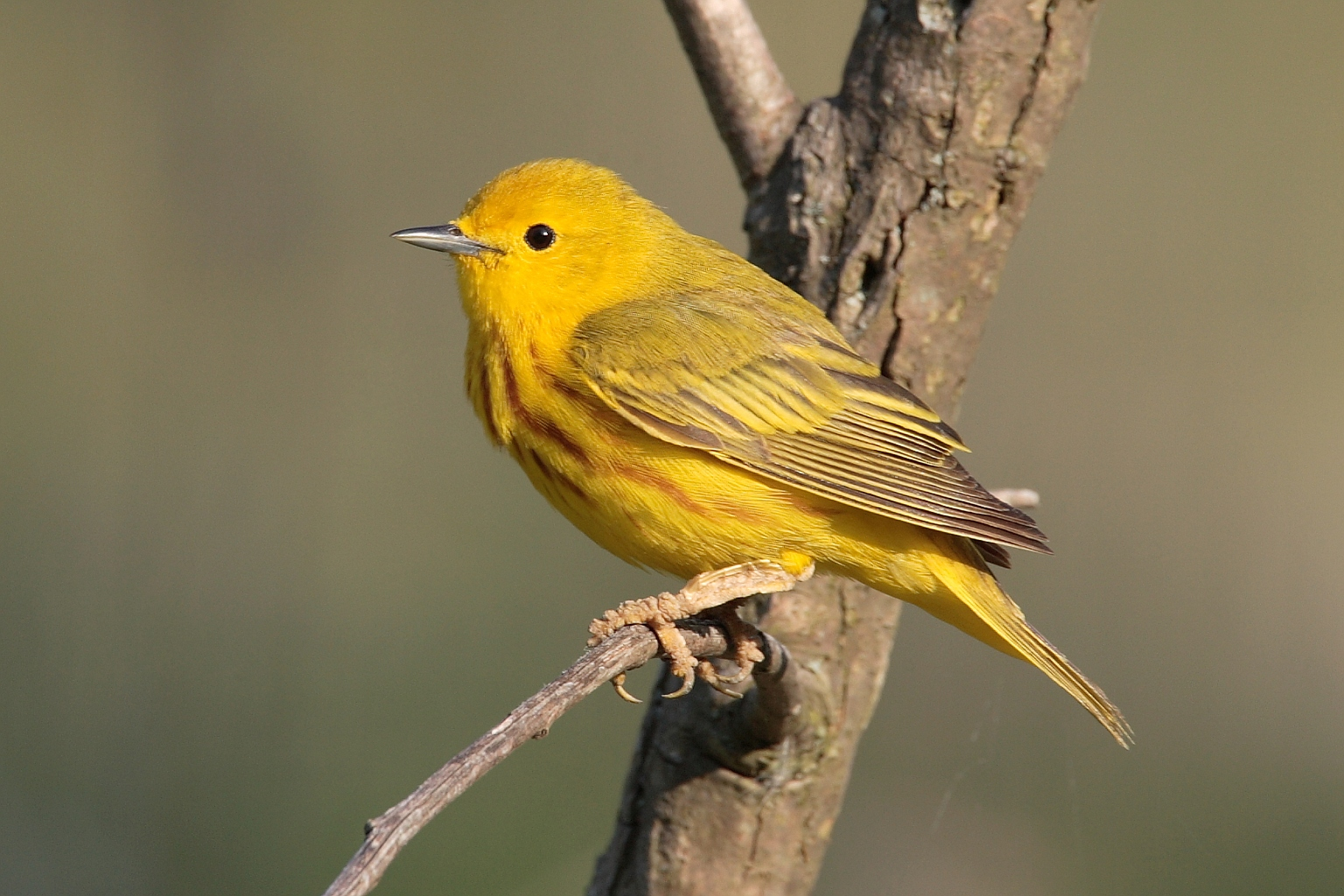
A yellow warbler belonging to one of the migratory northern races.

Order: Passeriformes Family: Parulidae

The wood-warblers are a group of small, often colorful, passerine birds restricted to the New World. Most are arboreal, but some are terrestrial. Most members of this family are insectivores.

- Ovenbird, Seiurus aurocapilla
- Worm-eating warbler, Helmitheros vermivorum
- Louisiana waterthrush, Parkesia motacilla
- Northern waterthrush, Parkesia noveboracensis
- Golden-winged warbler, Vermivora chrysoptera (near-threatened)
- Blue-winged warbler, Vermivora cyanoptera
- Black-and-white warbler, Mniotilta varia
- Prothonotary warbler, Protonotaria citrea
- Swainson's warbler, Limnothlypis swainsonii (A)
- Flame-throated warbler, Leiothlypis gutturalis
- Tennessee warbler, Leiothlypis peregrina
- Orange-crowned warbler, Leiothlypis celata (A)
- Nashville warbler, Leiothlypis ruficapilla (A)
- Virginia's warbler, Oreothlypis virginiae (A)
- Connecticut warbler, Leiothlypis agilis (A)
- Gray-crowned yellowthroat, Geothlypis poliocephala
- Masked yellowthroat, Geothlypis aequinoctialis (A)
- MacGillivray's warbler, Geothlypis tolmiei (A)
- Mourning warbler, Geothlypis philadelphia
- Kentucky warbler, Geothlypis formosa
- Olive-crowned yellowthroat, Geothlypis semiflava
- Common yellowthroat, Geothlypis trichas (A)
- Hooded warbler, Setophaga citrina
- American redstart, Setophaga ruticilla
- Cape May warbler, Setophaga tigrina
- Cerulean warbler, Setophaga cerulea (near-threatened)
- Northern parula, Setophaga americana (A)
- Tropical parula, Setophaga pitiayumi
- Magnolia warbler, Setophaga magnolia
- Bay-breasted warbler, Setophaga castanea
- Blackburnian warbler, Setophaga fusca
- Yellow warbler, Setophaga petechia
- Chestnut-sided warbler, Setophaga pensylvanica
- Blackpoll warbler, Setophaga striata (A) (near-threatened)
- Black-throated blue warbler, Setophaga caerulescens (A)
- Palm warbler, Setophaga palmarum
- Yellow-rumped warbler, Setophaga coronata
- Yellow-throated warbler, Setophaga dominica (A)
- Prairie warbler, Setophaga discolor (A)
- Townsend's warbler, Setophaga townsendi (A)
- Hermit warbler, Setophaga occidentalis (A)
- Golden-cheeked warbler, Setophaga chrysoparia (A) (endangered)
- Black-throated green warbler, Setophaga virens
- Buff-rumped warbler, Myiothlypis fulvicauda
- Chestnut-capped warbler, Basileuterus delattrii
- Black-cheeked warbler, Basileuterus melanogenys
- Pirre warbler, Basileuterus ignotus (vulnerable)
- Golden-crowned warbler, Basileuterus culicivorus
- Costa Rican warbler, Basileuterus melanotis
- Tacarcuna warbler, Basileuterus tacarcunae
- Canada warbler, Cardellina canadensis
- Wilson's warbler, Cardellina pusilla
- Slate-throated redstart, Myioborus miniatus
- Collared redstart, Myioborus torquatus

== Mitrospingid tanagers ==
Order: Passeriformes Family: Mitrospingidae

The members of this small family were previously included in Thraupidae ("true" tanagers). They were placed in this new family in 2017.

- Dusky-faced tanager, Mitrospingus cassinii

== Cardinals and allies ==
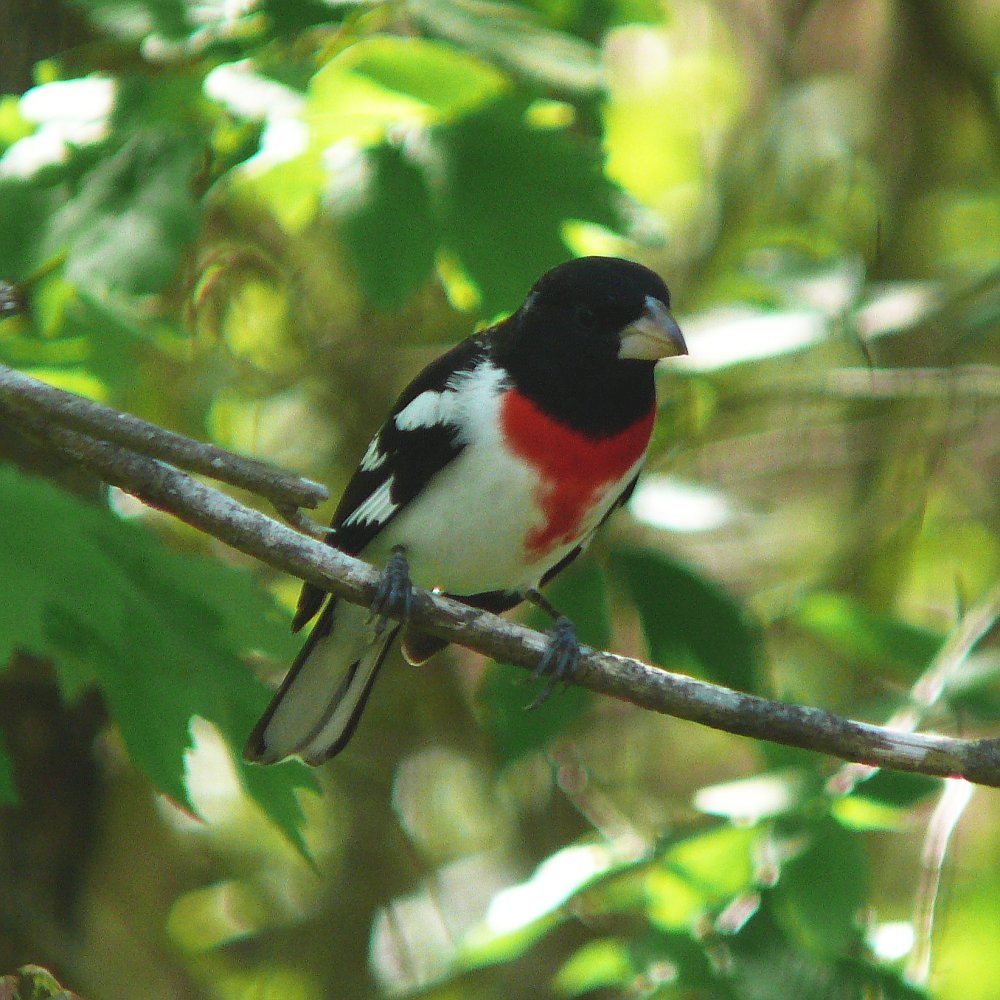
Rose-breasted grosbeak, a passage migrant and winter visitor.

Order: Passeriformes Family: Cardinalidae

The cardinals are a family of robust, seed-eating birds with strong bills. They are typically associated with open woodland. The sexes usually have distinct plumages.

- Hepatic tanager, Piranga flava
- Summer tanager, Piranga rubra
- Scarlet tanager, Piranga olivacea
- Western tanager, Piranga ludoviciana
- Flame-colored tanager, Piranga bidentata
- White-winged tanager, Piranga leucoptera
- Red-crowned ant-tanager, Habia rubica
- Red-throated ant-tanager, Habia fuscicauda
- Black-cheeked ant-tanager, Habia atrimaxillaris (A)
- Carmiol's tanager, Chlorothraupis carmioli
- Lemon-spectacled tanager, Chlorothraupis olivacea
- Black-faced grosbeak, Caryothraustes poliogaster
- Yellow-green grosbeak, Caryothraustes canadensis
- Black-thighed grosbeak, Pheucticus tibialis
- Rose-breasted grosbeak, Pheucticus ludovicianus
- Blue seedeater, Amaurospiza concolor
- Blue-black grosbeak, Cyanoloxia cyanoides
- Blue grosbeak, Passerina caerulea
- Indigo bunting, Passerina cyanea
- Painted bunting, Passerina ciris (near-threatened)
- Dickcissel, Spiza americana

== Tanagers and allies ==
Order: Passeriformes Family: Thraupidae

The tanagers are a large group of small to medium-sized passerine birds restricted to the New World, mainly in the tropics. Many species are brightly colored. As a family they are omnivorous, but individual species specialize in eating fruits, seeds, insects, or other types of food. Most have short, rounded wings.

- Hooded tanager, Nemosia pileata (A)
- Blue-and-gold tanager, Bangsia arcaei (near-threatened)
- Speckled tanager, Ixothraupis guttata
- Gray-and-gold tanager, Poecilostreptus palmeri
- Golden-hooded tanager, Stilpnia larvata
- Blue-gray tanager, Thraupis episcopus
- Palm tanager, Thraupis palmarum
- Green-naped tanager, Tangara fucosa (near-threatened)
- Spangle-cheeked tanager, Tangara dowii
- Plain-colored tanager, Tangara inornata
- Rufous-winged tanager, Tangara lavinia
- Bay-headed tanager, Tangara gyrola
- Emerald tanager, Tangara florida
- Silver-throated tanager, Tangara icterocephala
- White-eared conebill, Conirostrum leucogenys
- Saffron finch, Sicalis flaveola (I)
- Grassland yellow-finch, Sicalis luteola
- Slaty finch, Haplospiza rustica
- Peg-billed finch, Acanthidops bairdi
- Slaty flowerpiercer, Diglossa plumbea
- Green honeycreeper, Chlorophanes spiza
- Black-and-yellow tanager, Chrysothlypis chrysomelas
- Sulphur-rumped tanager, Heterospingus rubrifrons
- Scarlet-browed tanager, Heterospingus xanthopygius
- Yellow-backed tanager, Hemithraupis flavicollis
- Blue-black grassquit, Volatinia jacarina
- Gray-headed tanager, Eucometis penicillata
- White-shouldered tanager, Loriotus luctuosus
- Tawny-crested tanager, Tachyphonus delatrii
- White-lined tanager, Tachyphonus rufus
- White-throated shrike-tanager, Lanio leucothorax
- Crimson-collared tanager, Ramphocelus sanguinolentus
- Flame-rumped tanager, Ramphocelus flammigerus
- Scarlet-rumped tanager, Ramphocelus passerinii
- Crimson-backed tanager, Ramphocelus dimidiatus
- Swallow tanager, Tersina viridis
- Shining honeycreeper, Cyanerpes lucidus
- Purple honeycreeper, Cyanerpes caeruleus
- Red-legged honeycreeper, Cyanerpes cyaneus
- Scarlet-thighed dacnis, Dacnis venusta
- Blue dacnis, Dacnis cayana
- Viridian dacnis, Dacnis viguieri (near-threatened)
- Bananaquit, Coereba flaveola
- Yellow-faced grassquit, Tiaris olivaceus
- Lesson's seedeater, Sporophila bouvronides (A)
- Lined seedeater, Sporophila lineola (A)
- Thick-billed seed-finch, Sporophila funerea
- Large-billed seed-finch, Sporophila crassirostris
- Nicaraguan seed-finch, Sporophila nuttingi
- Variable seedeater, Sporophila corvina
- Slate-colored seedeater, Sporophila schistacea
- Morelet's seedeater, Sporophila morelleti
- Yellow-bellied seedeater, Sporophila nigricollis
- Ruddy-breasted seedeater, Sporophila minuta
- Wedge-tailed grass-finch, Emberizoides herbicola
- Black-headed saltator, Saltator atriceps
- Olivaceous saltator, Saltator olivascens (A)
- Buff-throated saltator, Saltator maximus
- Slate-colored grosbeak, Saltator grossus
- Cinnamon-bellied saltator, Saltator grandis
- Blue-gray saltator, Saltator coerulescens
- Streaked saltator, Saltator striatipectus
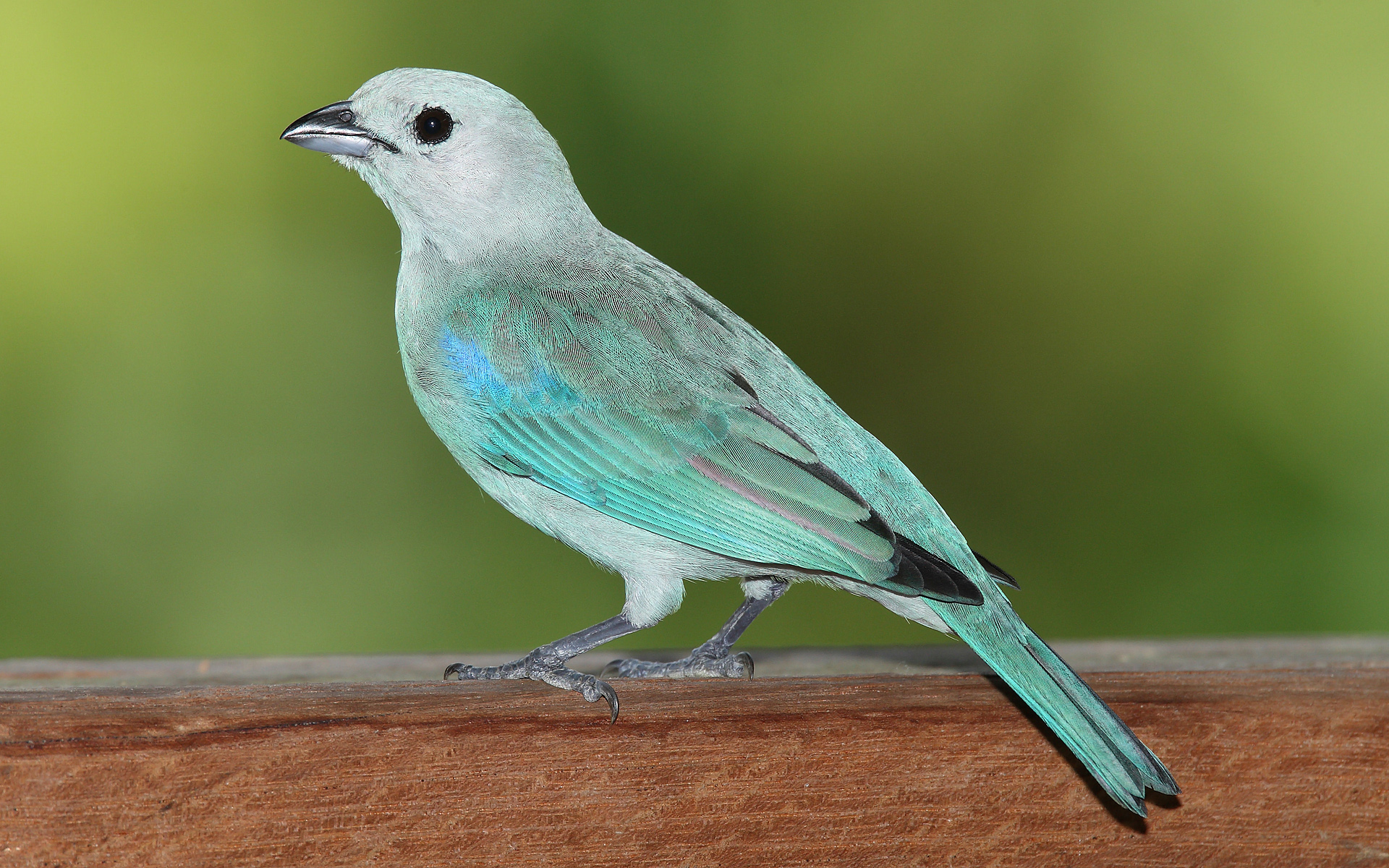
Blue-gray tanager, Darién. A common and tame bird which often visits gardens.

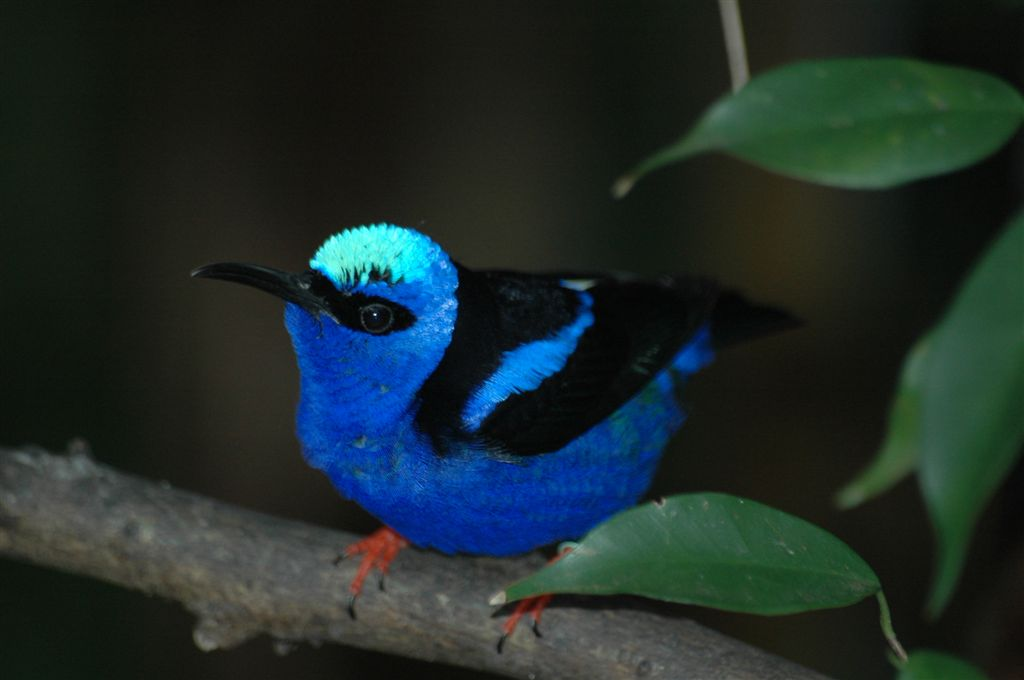
Red-legged honeycreeper, a widespread resident.

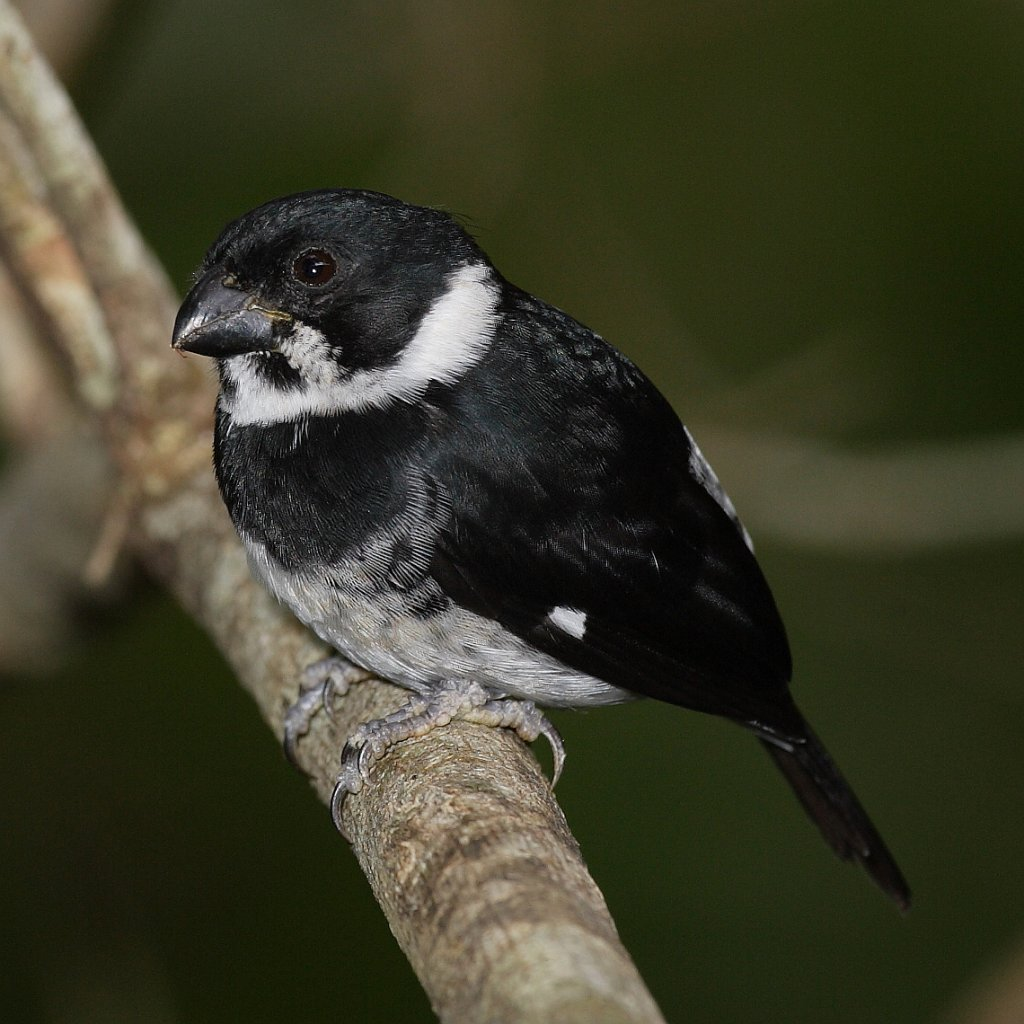
Variable seedeater, very common throughout the lowlands.

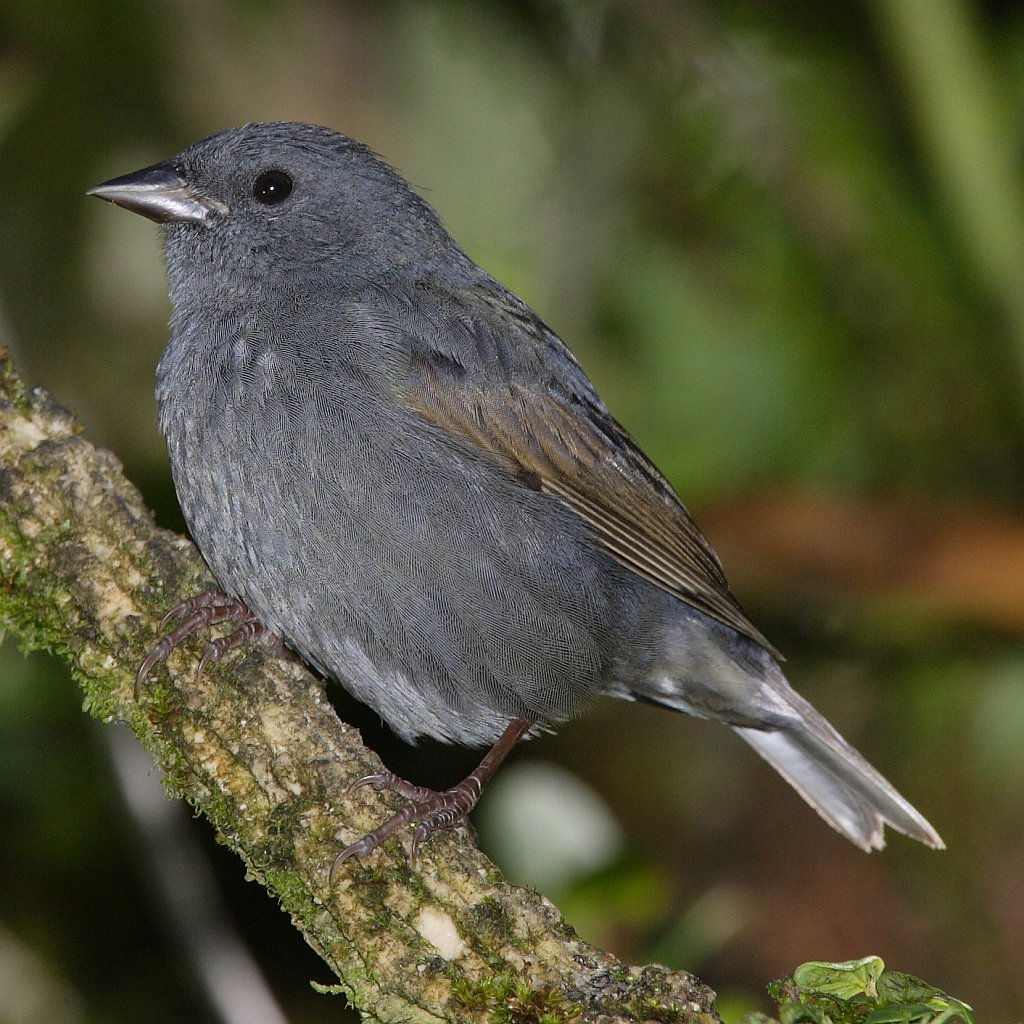
Slaty finch, Guadalupe. A rare bird of the western highlands.

== See also ==
- List of birds
- Lists of birds by region
