= Tacarcuna chlorospingus =

Conservation status
- Least Concern (IUCN 3.1)

Scientific classification
- Kingdom: Animalia
- Phylum: Chordata
- Class: Aves
- Order: Passeriformes
- Family: Passerellidae
- Genus: Chlorospingus
- Species: C. tacarcunae

Binomial name
- Chlorospingus tacarcunae Griscom, 1924

Species of bird

The Tacarcuna chlorospingus (Chlorospingus tacarcunae) or Tacarcuna bush tanager is a species of bird in the family Passerellidae, the New World sparrows. It is found in Colombia and Panama.

== Taxonomy and systematics ==
The Tacarcuna chlorospingus has a complicated taxonomic history. It was formally described in 1924 with its current binomial Chlorospingus tacarcunae. During the next two decades different authors treated it as a subspecies what are now the yellow-throated chlorospingus (C. flavigularis) or the common chlorospingus (C. flavopectus). From about 1976 it has been again treated as a full species. During this period the Chlorospingus species were members of the family Thraupidae, the "true" tanagers, though their position within the family were uncertain. Based on studies published in 2002, 2003, and 2007, beginning in 2010 taxonomic systems transferred Chlorospingus to its present sparrow family. The Chlorospingus species were originally called "bush tanagers" or "bush-tanagers". Beginning in 2013 systems began changing the English name of the members of the genus to "chlorospingus" because they were no longer considered tanagers.

The Tacarcuna chlorospingus is monotypic.

== Description ==
The Tacarcuna chlorospingus is 13 to 14 cm (5.1 to 5.5 in) long and weighs about 18 g (0.63 oz). The sexes have the same plumage. Adults have a mostly dark olive head with a pale yellow throat. Their upperparts are dark olive. Their flight feathers are dusky with greenish yellow edges on the primaries, olive edges on the secondaries, and dark olive green edges on the tertials. Their tail is dusky with an olive tinge and olive green feather edges. Their upper breast is dull yellow, their sides, flanks, and undertail coverts greenish, and the middle of their breast and their belly dull yellowish. Both sexes have a pale orange iris, a black bill, and brownish gray legs and feet.

== Distribution and habitat ==
The Tacarcuna chlorospingus has a highly disjunct distribution. It is found on individual or abutting mountains from eastern Panamá and Colón provinces in central Panama to Darién Province and on both sides of Cerro Tacarcuna that straddles the Panama-Colombia border. It inhabits the interior and edges of montane evergreen forest and also elfin forest in the subtropical and lower temperate zones. In elevation it ranges overall between 850 and 1,500 m (2,800 and 4,900 ft). In Panamá Province it ranges between 850 and 1,000 m (2,800 and 3,300 ft) and on the Panamanian side of Cerro Tacarcuna between 1,230 and 1,440 m (4,000 and 4,700 ft). On the Colombian side it ranges between 1,200 and 1,500 m (3,900 and 4,900 ft).

== Behavior ==
=== Movement ===
The Tacarcuna chlorospingus is a year-round resident.

=== Feeding ===
The Tacarcuna chlorospingus is known to feed on insects and is assumed to feed on fruits as well like others of its genus. It forages at all levels of the forest. It forages in pairs and groups of up to about six individuals and regularly joins mixed-species feeding flocks.

=== Breeding ===
The Tacarcuna chlorospingus is thought to breed between February and August. The one known nest was in a bromeliad clump on a branch about 6.5 m (20 ft) above the ground. Nothing else is known about the species' breeding biology.

=== Vocalization ===
As of April 2026 xeno-canto had three recordings of Tacarcuna chlorospingus calls; the Cornell Lab's Macaulay Library had 15 others. Neither archive had recordings of its song. The species' call is described as "a single high-pitched tseeeu!".

== Status ==
The IUCN has assessed the Tacarcuna chlorospingus as being of Least Concern. It has a restricted range and its estimated population of at least 20,000 mature individuals is believed to be decreasing. The only expected threat is stress on its habitat due to climate change. "[The] Tacarcuna Chlorospingus has been always recorded in pristine or well conserved habitats according to its high degree of sensitivity to habitat disturbance."
