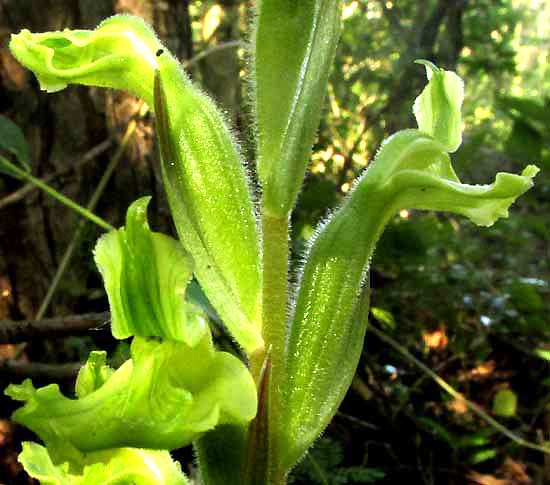
- Sarcoglottis sceptrodes flowers

Scientific classification
- Kingdom: Plantae
- Clade: Embryophytes
- Clade: Tracheophytes
- Clade: Angiosperms
- Clade: Monocots
- Order: Asparagales
- Family: Orchidaceae
- Subfamily: Orchidoideae
- Tribe: Cranichideae
- Genus: Sarcoglottis
- Species: S. sceptrodes

Binomial name
- Sarcoglottis sceptrodes (Rchb.f.) Schltr.

Synonyms
- Gyrostachys sceptrodes (Rchb.f.) Kuntze; Spiranthes sceptrodes Rchb.f.; Sacroglottis purpusiorum Schltr.

= Sarcoglottis sceptrodes =

Species of plant

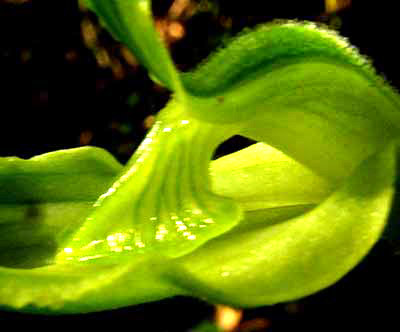
Flower side view showing down-curving lip's midlobe flaring broadly at tip

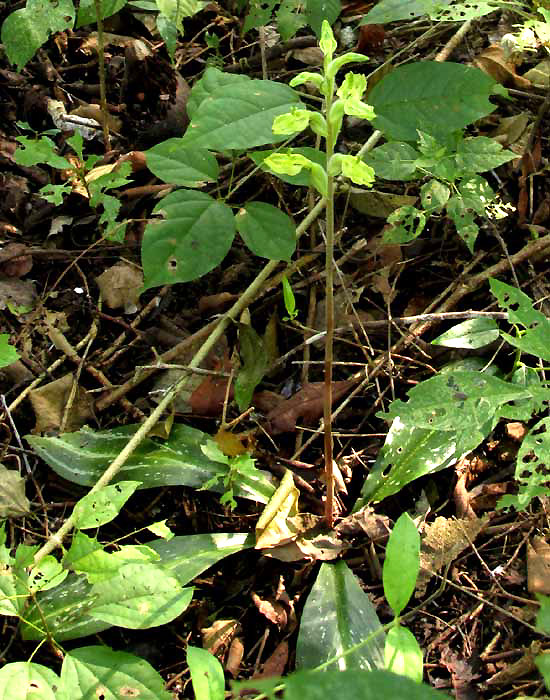
Plant in habitat

Sarcoglottis sceptrodes, with no commonly used English name, though species of the genus often are called jewel orchids, is a species of herbaceous plant native to Mexico and Central America. It belongs to the family Orchidaceae.

== Description ==
Here are key field marks useful for distinguishing Sarcoglottis sceptrodes from similar orchid species:

- It grows on the ground, not on trees.
- It produces no pseudobulbs.
- Flowering plants are up to 40 cm (15 1/2 in) tall, with stems less than 2 cm (3/4 in) long (flowers are held aloft on a peduncle).
- Leaves arise at the plant base and have discernible petioles which are white-green at their bases. Leaves die back during dry seasons.
- Inflorescences produce 5-11 flowers which are green or brownish green. The bract below each flower is more than three-fourths the length of the ovary, and its tip gradually diminishes to a sharp point.
- Each flower possesses a lip, or labellum, more than 3 cm (1 1/8 in) long, and which arcs outward and down. The tip of the lip's midlobe flares broadly into a flat tip (truncate). The flower's petals are straight, not curved, but the side sepals are curved and have wavy margins.

== Distribution ==
In Mexico Sarcoglottis sceptrodes occurs as far north as the coastal states of Sinaloa in the west and Tamaulipas in the east, southward, including the Yucatan Peninsula. In Central America it occurs in all countries.

== Habitat ==
In Costa Rica Sarcoglottis sceptrodes is documented flowering in February in secondary, tropical moist forest along a seasonal stream with tall trees, at an elevation of 370 m (1,210 ft). Images on this page show an individual flowering in January along a shaded trail in a dry forest in Mexico's Yucatan Peninsula, at an elevation of 40 m (130 ft). In a study of orchid diversity in an area near Papantla, Veracruz, México, with a warm, humid climate with abundant summer rainfall, and at 200 m (660 ft) in elevation, Sarcoglottis sceptrodes was the third most abundant species, the top three species contributing over half of the entire orchid population, which was represented by 13 species.

== As "collector orchids" ==
Sarcoglottis sceptrodes is grown by orchid collectors. The species is thought of as a "hot-growing orchid" preferring about 80% shade, regular watering with dry periods, and may be grown in pots.

== Taxonomy ==
In 1855 when Heinrich Gustav Reichenbach formally described and named Sarcoglottis sceptrodes under the basionym Spiranthes sceptrodes, he noted "Segovia Guanacarta Oersted." "Segovia" appears to be Las Segovias, a mountainous region in northern Nicaragua. "Guanacarta" corresponds to Guanacaste Province, Costa Rica. It is unclear why "Segovia" was mentioned, but the type specimen is said to be "undoubtedly from 'Guanacarta' (Guanascaste {sic}) in Costa Rica." Oersted had to be Anders Sandøe Ørsted who collected plants in Costa Rica and Nicaragua during the mid 1800s.

=== Etymology ===
The genus name Sarcoglottis comes from the Greek sarx meaning "flesh", and glotta, meaning "tongue." This refers to the fleshy lip of the genus's type species.

The species name sceptrodes is based on the Greek skeptron or sceptrum, which mean "wand, shaft, or baton," and odes meaning "resembling." Thus "resembling a wand or baton," in allusion to the inflorescence's shape.
