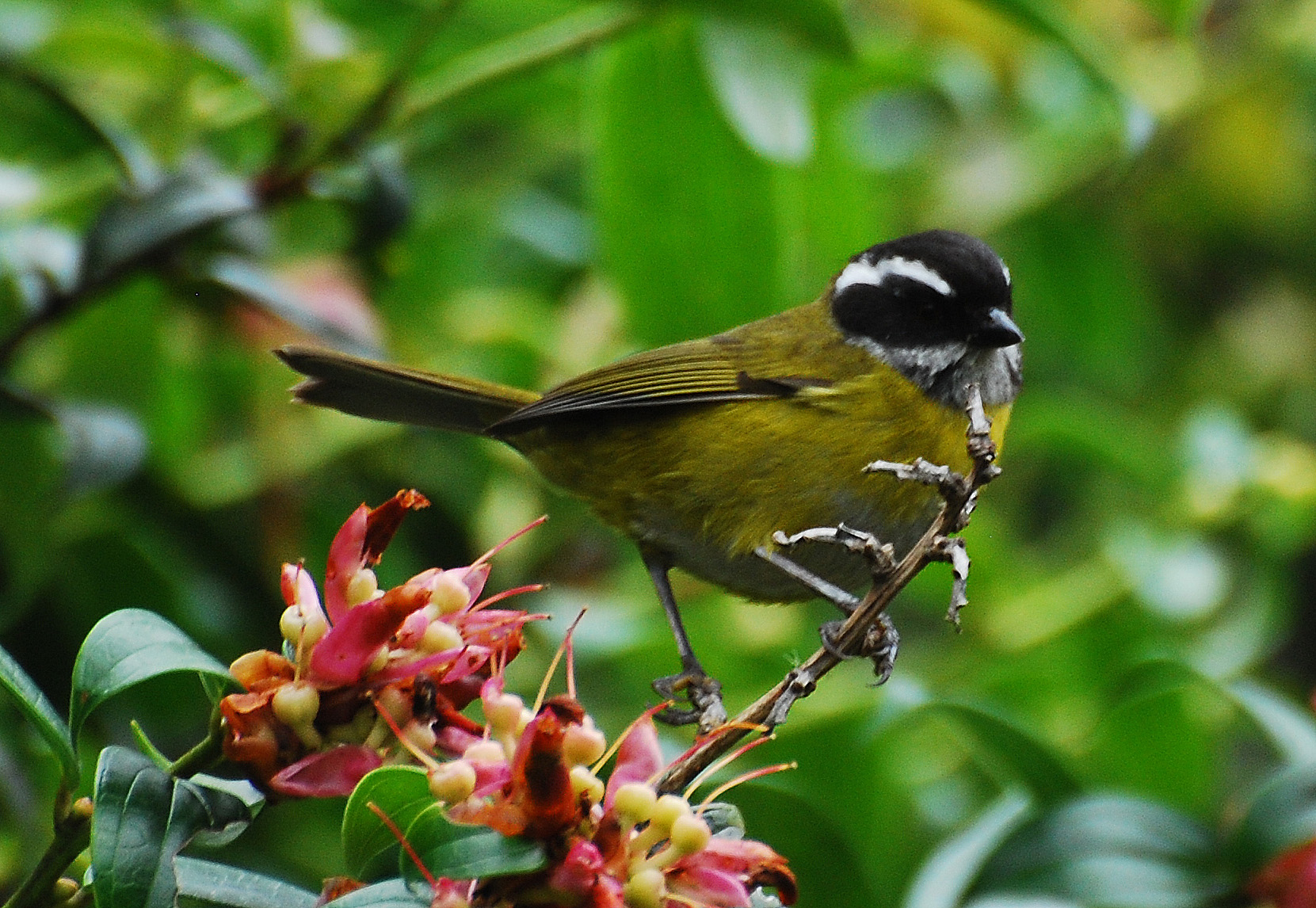

Conservation status
- Least Concern (IUCN 3.1)

Scientific classification
- Kingdom: Animalia
- Phylum: Chordata
- Class: Aves
- Order: Passeriformes
- Family: Passerellidae
- Genus: Chlorospingus
- Species: C. pileatus

Binomial name
- Chlorospingus pileatus Salvin, 1865

= Sooty-capped chlorospingus =

Species of bird

The sooty-capped chlorospingus (Chlorospingus pileatus) or sooty-capped bush tanager, is a small passerine bird in the family Passerellidae, the New World sparrows. It is found in Costa Rica and Panama.

== Taxonomy and systematics ==
The sooty-capped chlorospingus was formally described in 1865 with its current binomial Chlorospingus pileatus. At the time the Chlorospingus species were members of the family Thraupidae, the "true" tanagers, though their positions within the family were uncertain. Based on studies published in 2002, 2003, and 2007, beginning in 2010 taxonomic systems transferred Chlorospingus to its present sparrow family. The Chlorospingus species were originally called "bush tanagers" or "bush-tanagers". Beginning in 2013 systems began changing the English name of the members of the genus to "chlorospingus" because they were no longer considered tanagers.

The sooty-capped chlorospingus' further taxonomy is unresolved. The IOC, AviList, and BirdLife International's Handbook of the Birds of the World treat it as monotypic. However, as of late 2025 the Clements taxonomy recognizes a second subspecies, C. p. diversus (Griscom, 1924). In addition to the systems that do not recognize diversus, the account in the Cornell Lab of Ornithology's Birds of the World says that it appears inseparable from the nominate subspecies.

This article treats the species as monotypic.

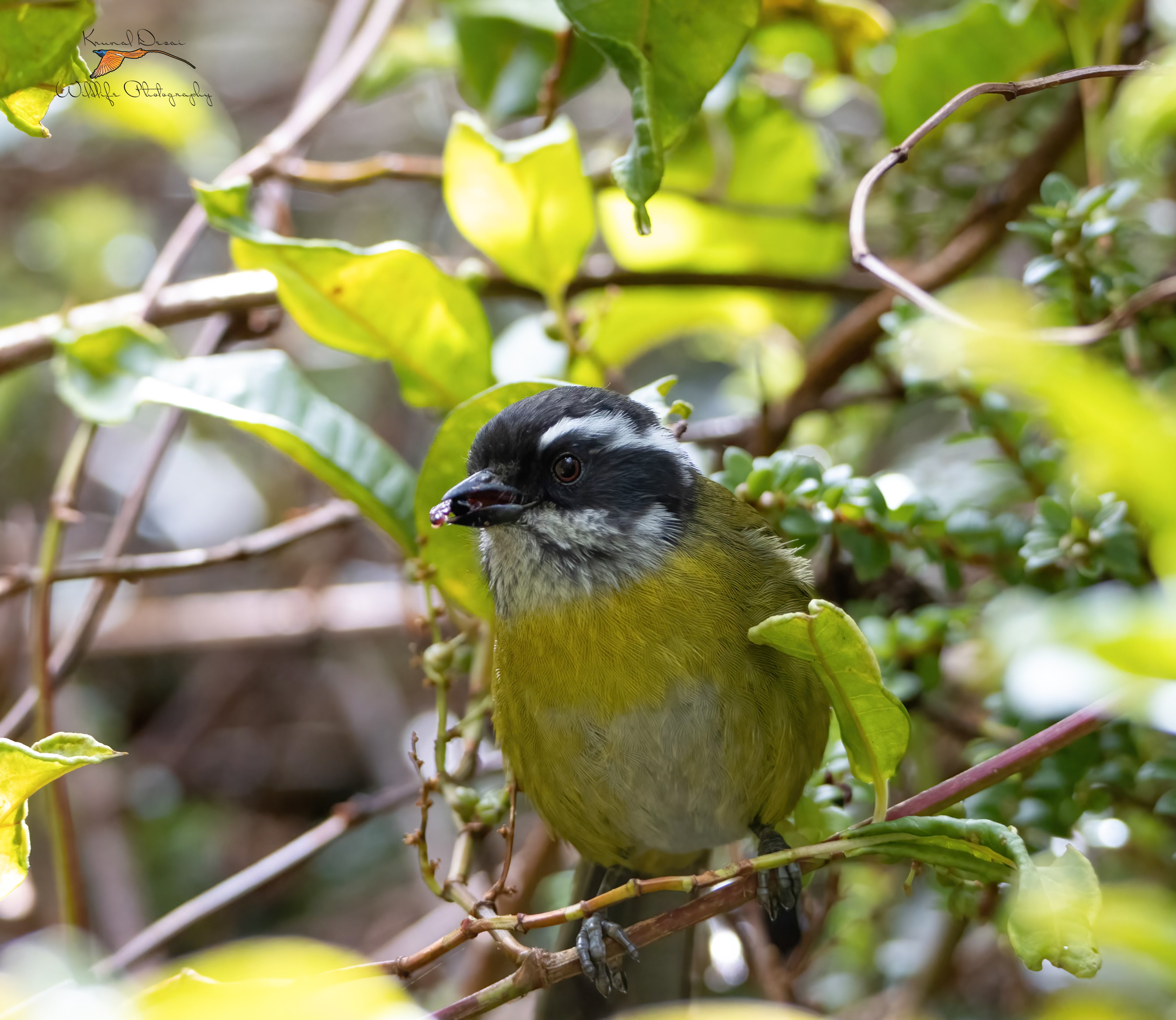
Sooty-capped chlorospingus in shrub at Volcán Poás National Park.

== Description ==
The sooty-capped chlorospingus is 13 to 14 cm (5.1 to 5.5 in) long and weighs about 16 to 24 g (0.56 to 0.85 oz). The sexes have the same plumage. Adults have a mostly sooty black head with a bold jagged white stripe from above the eye back and down the neck; its shape has been likened to a lightning bolt. Their upperparts and tail are olive. Their flight feathers are dusky with olive-yellow edges. Their throat is whitish with many, though inconspicuous, black specks. The most common color morph has a wide band of olive-yellow across the breast that extends along the sides, flanks, and undertail coverts. The center of its lower breast and its belly are yellowish white. A less common morph, found only on two volcanoes in Costa Rica, is duller and grayer overall than the common morph and has grayish olive underparts. Both morphs have a reddish brown iris, a blackish bill, and dull brownish to fuscous black legs and feet.

== Distribution and habitat ==
The sooty-capped chlorospingus is found on several isolated volcanoes in north-central Costa Rica's Cordillera de Tilarán, in the Cordillera de Talamanca from south-central Costa Rica into northern Panama's Chiriquí Province, and on isolated volcanoes further south in Chiriquí. Its range is within that of the very widespread common chlorospingus (C. opthamalicus) but they are separable by their head patterns and mostly different elevational habitats. The sooty-capped chlorospingus inhabits montane evergreen forest, elfin forest, and mature secondary forest in the subtropical and lower temperate zones. In elevation it ranges overall between 1,500 and 3,000 m (4,900 and 9,800 ft). In Costa Rica it is found mostly above 2,000 m (6,600 ft).

== Behavior ==
=== Movement ===
The sooty-capped chlorospingus is a year-round resident.

=== Feeding ===
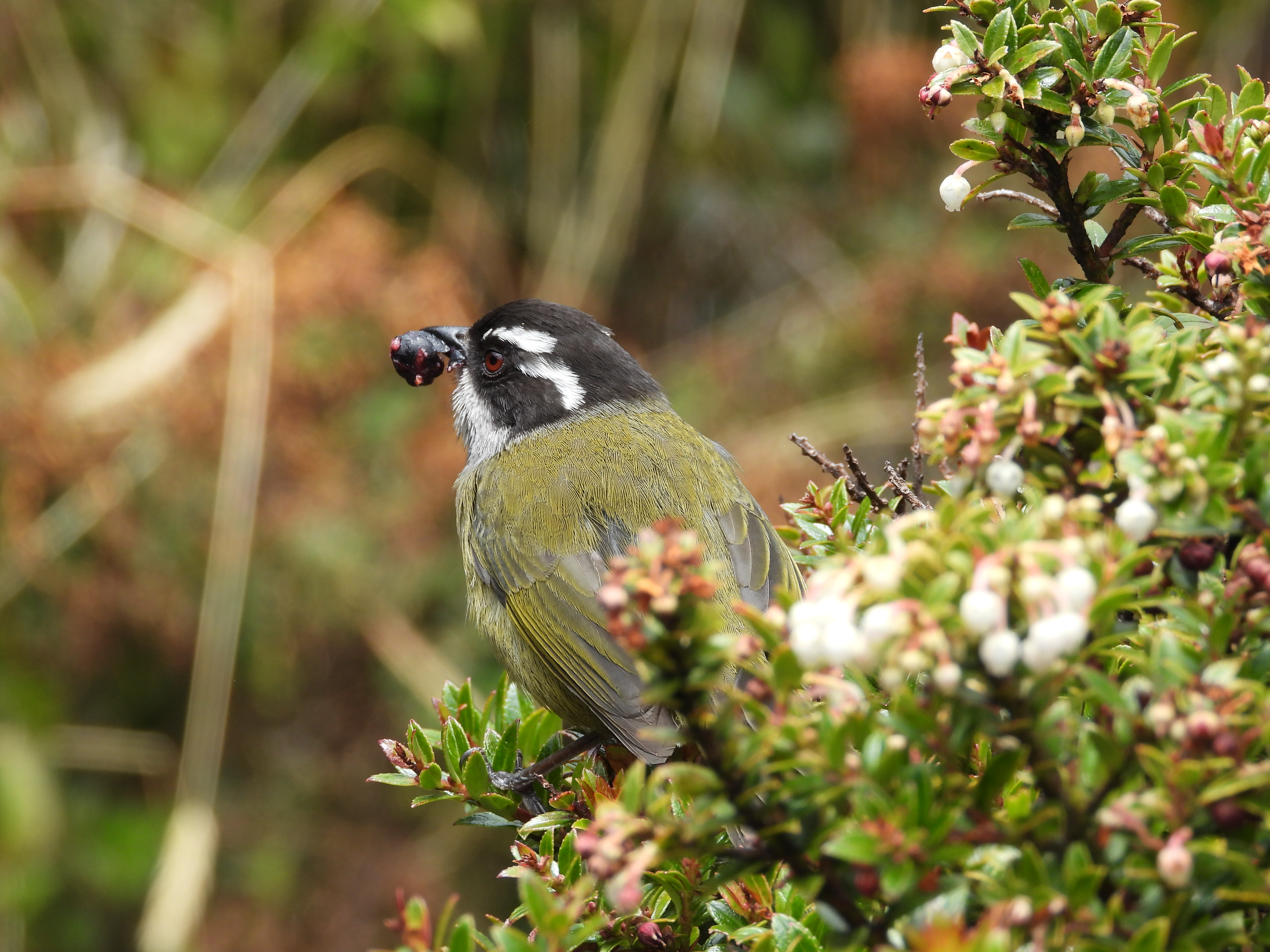
Sooty-capped chlorospingus feeding at Parque Nacional Volcán Irazú

The sooty-capped chlorospingus feeds on small arthropods and fruits. In the breeding season it forages in pairs or groups of up to about six individuals; outside that season it sometimes associates in groups of up to about 40 individuals. In both seasons it regularly joins mixed-species feeding flocks. It flicks its wings and tail while foraging. It feeds mostly from the forest's understory to its mid-level, seeking food in dense shrubs, on moss branches, in bromeliads, and in clusters of dead leaves.

=== Breeding ===
The sooty-capped chlorospingus breeds between February and July in Costa Rica. It might be a cooperative breeder, as several adults have been recorded attending one nest. The nest is a bulky cup made from moss, liverworts, and Usnea lichen lined with finer, softer, plant fibers. Nests have been found in crevices in earthen banks, atop such banks, under moss in low shrubs, and in epiphytes on a branch. The last have been found up to about 11 m (35 ft) above the ground. The clutch is one or two eggs that are white with pinkish brown speckles and blotches. The incubation period, time to fledging, and details of parental care are not known.

=== Vocalization ===
The sooty-capped chlorospingus sings "a thin squeaky twittering". The song has been written as "see-chur see-chur see-chur see see see-chur" and "sit-sit swíee-d-d-d-d-d-d sit-a-wit". Its calls include "high, thin, lisping tsit notes [sometimes] followed by t-z-z-z-z-z-zit, chat-t-t-t-, zwee-zwee-zwee... and so on". It also makes "a high, double zit or zeet, and variety of high, scratchy notes such as tsip and tseep [and a] short chatter and a twitter".

== Status ==
The IUCN has assessed the sooty-capped chlorospingus as being of Least Concern. Though it has a restricted range its estimated population of at least 50,000 mature individuals is believed to be stable. No immediate threats have been identified. In Costa Rica it is considered fairly common on the peaks of the Cordillera de Tilarán and common above 2,000 m (6,600 ft) in the Cordillera de Talamanca. "Deforestation is widespread within the notably small global range of this species."
