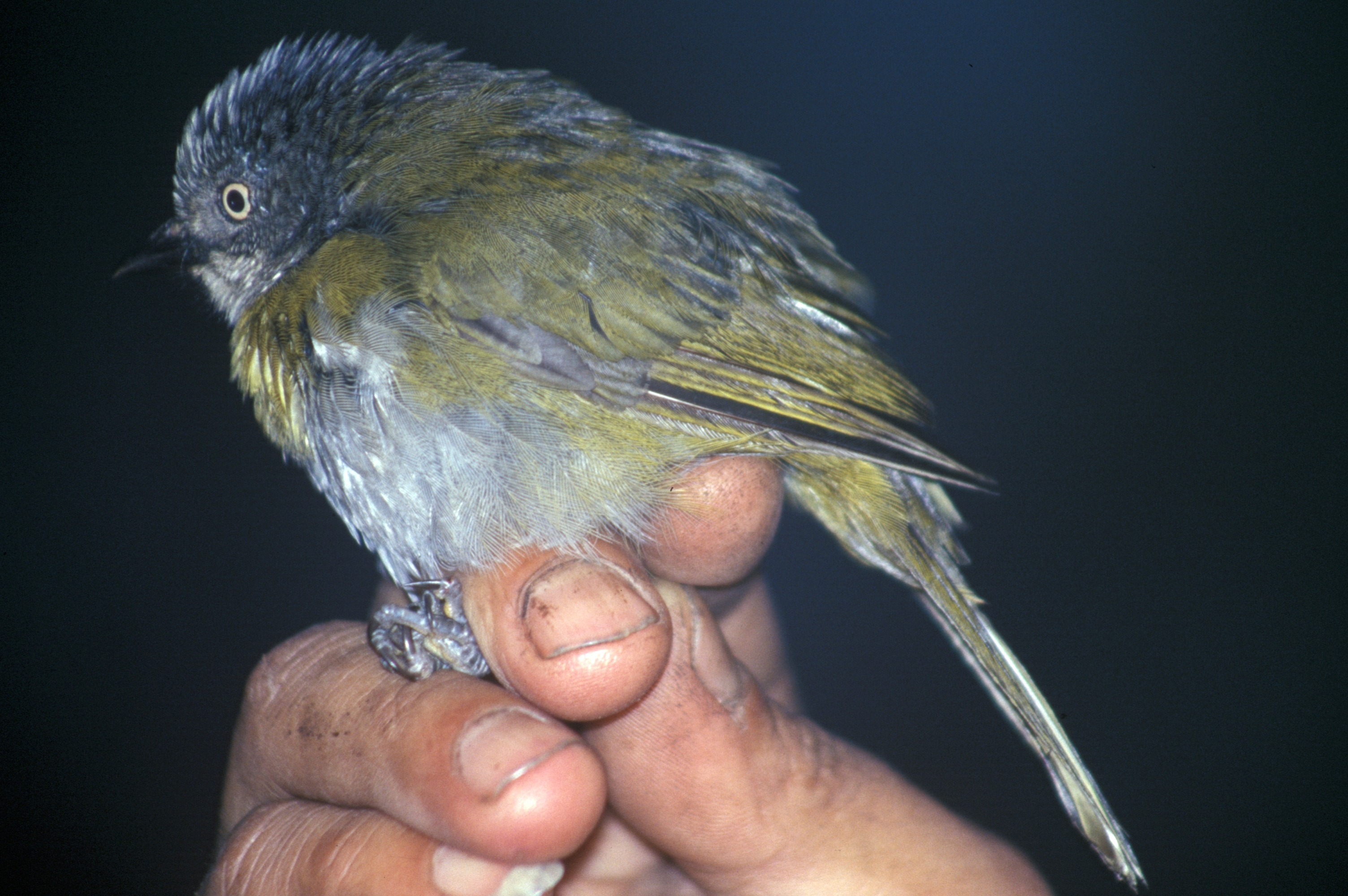
- Common chlorospingus (C. flavopectus)

Scientific classification
- Kingdom: Animalia
- Phylum: Chordata
- Class: Aves
- Order: Passeriformes
- Family: Passerellidae
- Genus: Chlorospingus; Cabanis, 1851

Type species
- Chlorospingus leucophrys Cabanis, 1851=Arremon ophthalmicus Du Busde Gisignies, 1847

Species
- See text

= Chlorospingus =

Genus of birds

Chlorospingus is a genus of perching birds, the bush tanagers, traditionally placed in the tanager family (Thraupidae). More recent studies which suggest they are closely related to the genus Arremonops in the Passerellidae (American sparrows). As of July, 2017, the American Ornithological Society assigns the genus to the new family Passerellidae, which contains the New World sparrows.

== Taxonomy ==
The genus Chlorospingus was introduced in 1851 by the German ornithologist Jean Cabanis to accommodate a single species, Chlorospingus leucophrys Cabanis. This scientific name is a junior synonym of Arremon ophthalmicus Du Busde Gisignies, 1847, which is now treated as a subspecies of Chlorospingus flavopectus, the common chlorospingus. The genus name Chlorospingus combined the Ancient Greek χλωρος/khlōros meaning "green" with σπινος/spinos a small bird found in Greece, perhaps a chaffinch.

The genus contains the following eight species:

Genus Chlorospingus – Cabanis, 1851 – eight species
Common name	Scientific name and subspecies	Range	Size and ecology	IUCN status and estimated population
Yellow-throated chlorospingus	Chlorospingus flavigularis (Sclater, 1852) Three subspecies: C. f. hypophaeus: Panama from Bocas del Toro to Coclé Province and separately in western Guna Yala; apparently Cerro Tacarcuna in northwestern Colombia; C. f. marginatus: western slope of Colombia's Western Andes from Valle del Cauca south, continuing along the western slope in Ecuador to El Oro Province; C. f. flavigularis: far northern Western Andes and both slopes of the Central Andes in Antioquia, and the eastern slope of the Eastern Andes from Boyacá south through Ecuador and intermittently Peru to Puno; also the Serranía de San Lucas	Disjunct distribution: Panama (Bocas del Toro to Coclé provinces and western Guna Yala), apparently Cerro Tacarcuna in northwestern Colombia, and the Andes of Colombia, Ecuador and Peru (south to Puno Department), including the Serranía de San Lucas in northern Colombia	Size: 15 cm (5.9 in); 21.5–31 g (0.76–1.1 oz); C. f. hypophaeus smaller at 12–13 cm (4.7–5.1 in) and 15–20 g (0.53–0.71 oz) Habitat: Montane and lowland evergreen forest and secondary forest in the tropical and lower subtropical zones, favouring the understory and edges; 240–900 m (790–3,000 ft) in Panama (mostly above 450 m/1,500 ft), 600–2,000 m (2,000–6,600 ft) in Colombia, mostly 700–1,800 m (2,300–5,900 ft) in Ecuador and 750–1,800 m (2,500–5,900 ft) in Peru Diet: Berries, fruit and insects (South American subspecies); gleans from leaves, branches, moss and vines, mostly in the lower to middle levels; forages in pairs or groups of up to about 12 and often joins mixed-species flocks. Diet of C. f. hypophaeus not studied but assumed similar	LC Stable; population size not known
Yellow-whiskered chlorospingus	Chlorospingus parvirostris Chapman, 1901 Three subspecies: C. p. huallagae: eastern slope of Colombia's Eastern Andes and south on the eastern slope through Ecuador into northwestern Peru along the border of Piura and Cajamarca departments; C. p. medianus: eastern slope of the Peruvian Andes from southern Amazonas Department to northern Huánuco Department; C. p. parvirostris: eastern Andean slope from southern Huánuco south into Bolivia as far as western Cochabamba Department	Disjunct distribution on the eastern slope of the Andes, from Colombia's Eastern Andes south through Ecuador and Peru into Bolivia as far as western Cochabamba Department	Size: 14 cm (5.5 in); 17.5–28.5 g (0.62–1.0 oz) Habitat: Humid to wet subtropical forest, especially areas laden with moss and epiphytes; favours the lower to middle zones and edges (at least in Ecuador); 1,300–2,400 m (4,300–7,900 ft) in Colombia, mostly 1,200–2,250 m (3,900–7,400 ft) in Ecuador, 1,100–2,750 m (3,600–9,000 ft) in Peru Diet: Berries, fruit and arthropods; forages in pairs or groups of up to about 8 and regularly joins mixed-species flocks	LC
Ashy-throated chlorospingus	Chlorospingus canigularis (Lafresnaye, 1848) Five subspecies: C. c. olivaceiceps: Costa Rica on the eastern slope of the volcanoes in the Central Valley and in the upper Reventazón River watershed; western Panama between Bocas del Toro and Veraguas provinces; C. c. canigularis: southern Táchira state in western Venezuela south along the western slope of Colombia's Eastern Andes; C. c. conspicillatus: both slopes of Colombia's Central and Western Andes; C. c. paulus: western slope of the Andes from northern Ecuador's western Pichincha Province south into far northwestern Peru's Tumbes Department; locally in coastal mountains in southern Manabí and northern Santa Elena provinces, Ecuador; C. c. signatus: eastern slope of the Andes from northern Ecuador's Napo Province south and intermittently through Peru to northern Puno Department	Highly disjunct distribution: Costa Rica, western Panama (Bocas del Toro to Veraguas provinces), and the Andes of western Venezuela (south from Táchira), Colombia, Ecuador and Peru (to northern Puno Department)	Size: 13–14 cm (5.1–5.5 in); 14.5–21 g (0.51–0.74 oz) Habitat: Wet forest heavy with moss, mostly in the canopy and edges; lowland and tropical evergreen forest and tropical deciduous forest; overall 400–2,000 m (1,300–6,600 ft): 400–1,200 m in Costa Rica, 1,200–2,000 m in Colombia, mostly 700–1,300 m in western Ecuador and 1,000–1,900 m in the east, mostly 1,000–1,800 m in Peru, 1,250–2,000 m in Venezuela Diet: Diet not well known but includes fruits; forages in pairs or groups of up to about 10 and regularly joins mixed-species flocks	LC
Sooty-capped chlorospingus	Chlorospingus pileatus Salvin, 1865	Several isolated volcanoes in north-central Costa Rica's Cordillera de Tilarán, the Talamancan montane forests from south-central Costa Rica into Chiriquí Province in northern Panama, and isolated volcanoes further south in Chiriquí	Size: 13–14 cm (5.1–5.5 in); 16–24 g (0.56–0.85 oz) Habitat: Montane evergreen forest, elfin forest and mature secondary forest in the subtropical and lower temperate zones; 1,500–3,000 m (4,900–9,800 ft), mostly above 2,000 m (6,600 ft) in Costa Rica Diet: Small arthropods and fruits; forages from the understory to mid-level in dense shrubs, on mossy branches, in bromeliads and in clusters of dead leaves; in pairs or groups of up to about 6 in the breeding season, sometimes up to about 40 outside it; regularly joins mixed-species flocks	LC
Common chlorospingus	Chlorospingus flavopectus (Lafresnaye, 1840)	Montane Neotropics, from Mexico through Central America and the Andes of Venezuela, Colombia, Ecuador and Peru to the Yungas of northwestern Argentina	Size: 13.5 cm (5.3 in); 20 g (0.71 oz) Habitat: Cloud forests with ample undergrowth and adjacent bushy clearings; 400–2,300 m (1,300–7,500 ft) in Middle America, 2,000–3,500 m (6,600–11,500 ft) near the Equator Diet: Insects, spiders, small fruits and nectar; usually in small groups or in mixed-species flocks	LC
Tacarcuna chlorospingus	Chlorospingus tacarcunae Griscom, 1924	Highly disjunct distribution on individual or abutting mountains in Panama, from eastern Panamá and Colón provinces to Darién Province, and on both sides of Cerro Tacarcuna on the Panama–Colombia border	Size: 13–14 cm (5.1–5.5 in); about 18 g (0.64 oz) Habitat: Interior and edges of montane evergreen forest and elfin forest in the subtropical and lower temperate zones; 850–1,500 m (2,800–4,900 ft) Diet: Known to feed on insects and assumed to eat fruits as well; forages at all levels of the forest, in pairs or groups of up to about 6, and regularly joins mixed-species flocks	LC
Pirre chlorospingus	Chlorospingus inornatus (Nelson, 1912)	Extreme eastern Darién Province, Panama, near the Colombian border: Cerro Pirre, Cerro Sapo and the Serranía de Jungurudó	Size: 15 cm (5.9 in); 20–36 g (0.71–1.3 oz) Habitat: Canopy and edges of montane evergreen forest and elfin forest in the upper tropical and subtropical zones, favouring stands of bamboo and vine tangles; 800–1,650 m (2,600–5,400 ft) Diet: Fruits and small arthropods; forages mostly from mid-level to canopy on mossy branches, in fern clusters and among leaves, often hanging upside-down; in groups of up to 6 and regularly, but not exclusively, joins mixed-species flocks	LC
Dusky chlorospingus	Chlorospingus semifuscus Sclater & Salvin, 1873 Three subspecies: C. s. livingstoni: western slope of Colombia's Western Andes from southern Chocó Department south to Cauca Department; C. s. semifuscus: Pacific slope of the Andes from Nariño Department in southwestern Colombia south to Cotopaxi Province in west-central Ecuador; C. s. xanthothorax: southwestern Ecuador's El Oro and adjacent Loja provinces	Western slope of the Andes in Colombia (southern Chocó Department south) and Ecuador (to Cotopaxi Province), plus southwestern Ecuador's El Oro and Loja provinces	Size: 14–15 cm (5.5–5.9 in); 17–23 g (0.60–0.81 oz) Habitat: Wet montane forest in the foothills and subtropical zone, favouring foggy areas heavy with epiphytes; mostly the interior but also the edge; 1,200–2,400 m (3,900–7,900 ft) in Colombia, mostly 1,200–2,200 m (3,900–7,200 ft) in Ecuador Diet: Insects, berries and small fruits; hops along branches and gleans while perched, mostly in the understory of the forest interior; in pairs or groups of up to about 20 and regularly, but not exclusively, joins mixed-species flocks	LC

The taxonomy and systematics of the common bush tanager are under review; it appears to be a superspecies or even a complex of superspecies.
