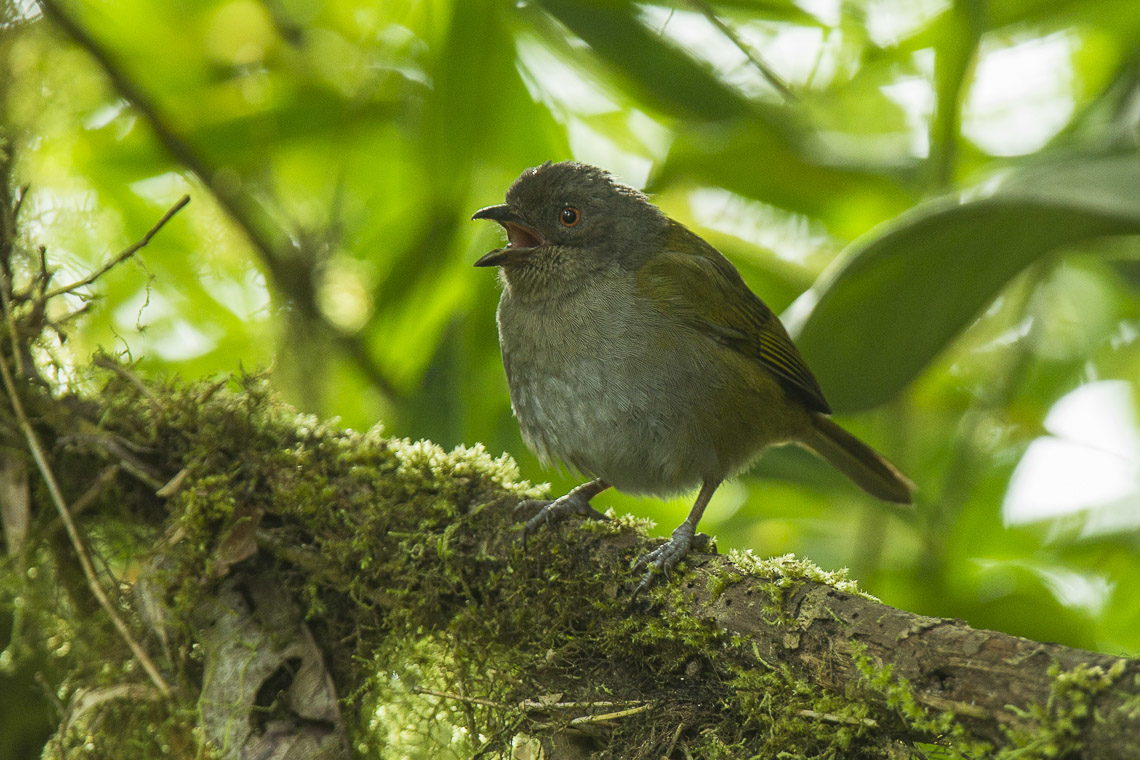

Conservation status
- Least Concern (IUCN 3.1)

Scientific classification
- Kingdom: Animalia
- Phylum: Chordata
- Class: Aves
- Order: Passeriformes
- Family: Passerellidae
- Genus: Chlorospingus
- Species: C. semifuscus

Binomial name
- Chlorospingus semifuscus Sclater, PL & Salvin, 1873
- Range of C. s. semifuscus and C. s. livingstoni (See the taxonomy and distribution sections)

= Dusky chlorospingus =

Species of bird

The dusky chlorospingus or dusky bush tanager (Chlorospingus semifuscus) is a species of bird in the family Passerellidae, the New World sparrows. It is found in Colombia and Ecuador.

== Taxonomy and systematics ==
The dusky chlorospingus was formally described in 1873 with its current binomial Chlorospingus semifuscus. From that time and into the twenty-first century the Chlorospingus species were members of the family Thraupidae, the "true" tanagers, though their position within the family were uncertain. Based on studies published in 2002, 2003, and 2007, beginning in 2010 taxonomic systems transferred Chlorospingus to its present sparrow family. The Chlorospingus species were originally called "bush tanagers" or "bush-tanagers". Beginning in 2013 systems began changing the English name of the members of the genus to "chlorospingus" because they were no longer considered tanagers.

The dusky chlorospingus' further taxonomy is unsettled. Since the middle of the twentieth century the species had been assigned two subspecies, the nominate C. s. semifuscus (Sclater, PL & Salvin, 1873) and C. s. livingstoni (Bond, J and Meyer de Schauensee, 1940). A study published in 2021 determined that a population of the common chlorospingus (C. flavopectus) in southwestern Ecuador did not belong to that species but rather to the dusky chlorospingus. The Clements taxonomy accepted that newly-described subspecies C. s. xanthothorax in 2022. The IOC followed suit in 2025 and the initial version of AviList included it that same year. However, as of late 2025 BirdLife International's Handbook of the Birds of the World (HBW) had not recognized it. Also in 2025, Clements subdivided the species into three monotypic "groups", calling the nominate the "red-eyed", livingtoni the "northern", and xanthothorax the "El Oro" dusky chlorospinguses.

This article follows the three-subspecies model.

== Description ==
The dusky chlorospingus is 14 to 15 cm (5.5 to 5.9 in) long and weighs 17 to 23 g (0.60 to 0.81 oz). The sexes have the same plumage. Adults of the nominate subspecies have a dark gray crown and face with sometimes a tiny white spot behind the eye. Their nape, upperparts, and tail are dark olive. Their flight feathers are dusky with yellowish olive edges except on the tertials, which are mostly dark olive. Their throat and underparts are mostly brownish gray. Their breast, flanks, and undertail coverts have an olive tinge. Both sexes have a light reddish brown to dark brownish red iris, a blackish bill, and dark gray to legs and feet. Subspecies C. s. livingstoni is darker overall than the nominate. Its head is more smoky gray, its upperparts are more smoky olive, and its underparts have less of a brownish tinge. It has a yellowish white iris. The head and upperparts of C. s. xanthothorax are similar to the nominate's. It has a greenish yellow breast, flanks, and undertail coverts and an orange-red iris.

== Distribution and habitat ==
Subspecies C. s. livingstoni of the dusky chlorospingus is the northernmost. It is found on the western slope of Colombia's Western Andes from southern Chocó Department south to Cauca Department in the far southwest. The nominate is found on the Pacific slope of the Andes from Nariño Department in the southwestern corner of Colombia south to west-central Ecuador's Cotopaxi Province. C. s. xanthothorax is found in southwestern Ecuador's El Oro and adjacent Loja provinces. Note that the map does not include the range of C. s. xanthothorax.

The dusky chlorospingus inhabits wet montane forest in the foothills and subtropical zone where it favors foggy areas heavy with epiphytes. In elevation it ranges between 1,200 and 2,400 m (3,900 and 7,900 ft) in Colombia and mostly between 1,200 and 2,200 m (3,900 and 7,200 ft) in Ecuador.

== Behavior ==
=== Movement ===
The dusky chlorospingus is a year-round resident.

=== Feeding ===
The dusky chlorospingus feeds on insects, berries, and small fruits. It typically forages in pairs and groups of up to about 20 individuals and regularly, but not exclusively, joins mixed-species feeding flocks. It forages mostly in the understory of the forest's interior but will do so at the forest edge. It takes most food while hopping along branches and stopping to glean while perched.

=== Breeding ===
The dusky chlorospingus' breeding season has not been fully defined but spans at least from April to June. Loose groups of males sing from ridgetops but nesting apparently occurs further downslope. One described nest was a cup made from grass and dry bamboo leaves embedded in a clump of moss and epiphytes. Both sexes provision nestlings. The clutch size, incubation period, time to fledging, and other details of parental care are not known.

=== Vocalization ===
The dusky chlorospingus' song is "a series of almost hummingbird-like, high-pitched notes that gradually speed up and gain strength, becoming quite 'spanking' before ending in a dry sputter". It is most often heard at dawn and sometimes in late afternoon. The species' calls are "an extremely high-pitched chip, often repeated, and a thin penetrating trill".

== Status ==
The IUCN follows HBW taxonomy and so has not included C. s. xanthothorax in its assessment of the dusky chlorospingus. The other two subspecies are jointly classified as being of Least Concern. Though their overall range is about 173,000 km^{2} (67,000 sq mi) the area actually occupied is not known. The combined population size is not known and is believed to be decreasing. No immediate threats have been identified. The full species is considered fairly common to common and occurs in several protected areas. "Deforestation and forest fragmentation is accelerating throughout its small global range."
