= Enteromius humeralis =

Conservation status
- Least Concern (IUCN 3.1)

Scientific classification
- Domain: Eukaryota
- Kingdom: Animalia
- Phylum: Chordata
- Class: Actinopterygii
- Order: Cypriniformes
- Family: Cyprinidae
- Subfamily: Smiliogastrinae
- Genus: Enteromius
- Species: E. humeralis

Binomial name
- Enteromius humeralis (Boulenger, 1902)

Synonyms
- Barbus humeralis Boulenger, 1902; Barbus dolichosoma Nichols & Griscom, 1917

Species of fish

Enteromius humeralis is a species of ray-finned fish in the genus Enteromius from the upper Congo River basin, in the Central African Republic, Democratic Republic of Congo and Congo.

== Footnotes ==
- Froese, Rainer; Pauly, Daniel (eds.). "Enteromius humeralis". FishBase.
