= Pirre chlorospingus =

Conservation status
- Least Concern (IUCN 3.1)

Scientific classification
- Kingdom: Animalia
- Phylum: Chordata
- Class: Aves
- Order: Passeriformes
- Family: Passerellidae
- Genus: Chlorospingus
- Species: C. inornatus

Binomial name
- Chlorospingus inornatus (Nelson, 1912)

Species of bird

The Pirre chlorospingus (Chlorospingus inornatus) or Pirre bush tanager is a species of bird in the family Passerellidae, the New World sparrows. It is endemic to Panama.

== Taxonomy and systematics ==
The Pirre chlorospingus was formally described by Edward William Nelson in 1912 with the binomial Hylospingus inornatus and the English name "Mount Pirri Tanager". Nelson erected the genus for this species and noted the strong similarity of Hylospingus to the existing genus Chlorospingus. Genus Hylospingus was later subsumed into Chlorospingus. During the twentieth century and into the twenty-first the Chlorospingus species were members of the family Thraupidae, the "true" tanagers, though their position within the family were uncertain. Based on studies published in 2002, 2003, and 2007, beginning in 2010 taxonomic systems transferred Chlorospingus to its present sparrow family. The Chlorospingus species were originally called "bush tanagers" or "bush-tanagers". Beginning in 2013 systems began changing the English name of the members of the genus to "chlorospingus" because they were no longer considered tanagers.

The Pirre chlorospingus is monotypic.

== Description ==
The Pirre chlorospingus is about 15 cm (5.9 in) long and weighs 20 to 36 g (0.71 to 1.3 oz). The sexes have the same plumage. Adults have a dark gray crown and face. Their nape and upperparts are olive-green. Their flight feathers are dusky with dark green edges on the outer webs of the primaries and wider olive edges on the secondaries; the tertials are mostly olive. The central tail feathers are dusky; the rest are dusky with increasing amounts of olive on their edges to the outermost. Their throat is yellowish white and their upper breast, sides, and flanks are darker olive-yellow. The middle of their lower breast, their belly, and their undertail coverts are yellow. Both sexes have a whitish to pale orange-yellow iris, a black bill, and slaty gray to fuscous black legs and feet.

== Distribution and habitat ==
The Pirre chlorospingus is found in extreme eastern Darién Province in Panama near the Colombian border. It is best known from Cerro Pirre (or Cerro Pirri), where the type specimen was collected, Cerro Sapo, and the Serranía de Jungurudó. There are also a few eBird records from Cerro Mecana in Colombia's west-central Chocó Department. However, the South American Classification Committee has no records in that country and major taxonomic systems also do not recognize it there. The Pirre chlorospingus inhabits the canopy and edges of montane evergreen forest and also elfin forest in the upper tropical and subtropical zones. It favors stands of bamboo and vine tangles. It elevation it ranges from 800 to 1,650 m (2,600 to 5,400 ft).

== Behavior ==
=== Movement ===
The Pirre chlorospingus is believed to be a year-round resident.

=== Feeding ===
The Pirre chlorospingus feeds on fruits and small arthropods. It typically forages in small groups of up to six individuals and regularly, but not exclusively, joins mixed-species feeding flocks. It forages mostly from the forest's mid-level to its canopy, seeking food on mossy branches, in fern clusters, and among leaves. It often hangs upside-down while searching.

=== Breeding ===
Nothing is known about the Pirre chlorospingus' breeding biology.

=== Vocalization ===
As of April 2026 xeno-canto had two recordings of Tacarcuna inornatus calls, one of which included song; the Cornell Lab's Macaulay Library had one of them and 18 other recordings. The species' song has not been put into words. Its calls are "three different thin, buzzy, high-pitched notes, including spéétza, a simple tsip and chuweet?, any one of them uttered singly, repeated up to four times (most often), or the three given in various combinations".

== Status ==
The IUCN has assessed the Pirre chlorospingus as being of Least Concern. It has a restricted range and its estimated population of at least 20,000 mature individuals is believed to be stable. The only expected threat is stress on its habitat due to climate change. It "[o]ccurs within remote and largely inaccessible Darién National Park (Panama). Threats to this region are at present minimal, but the park, because of its remoteness, largely lacks effective protection".
