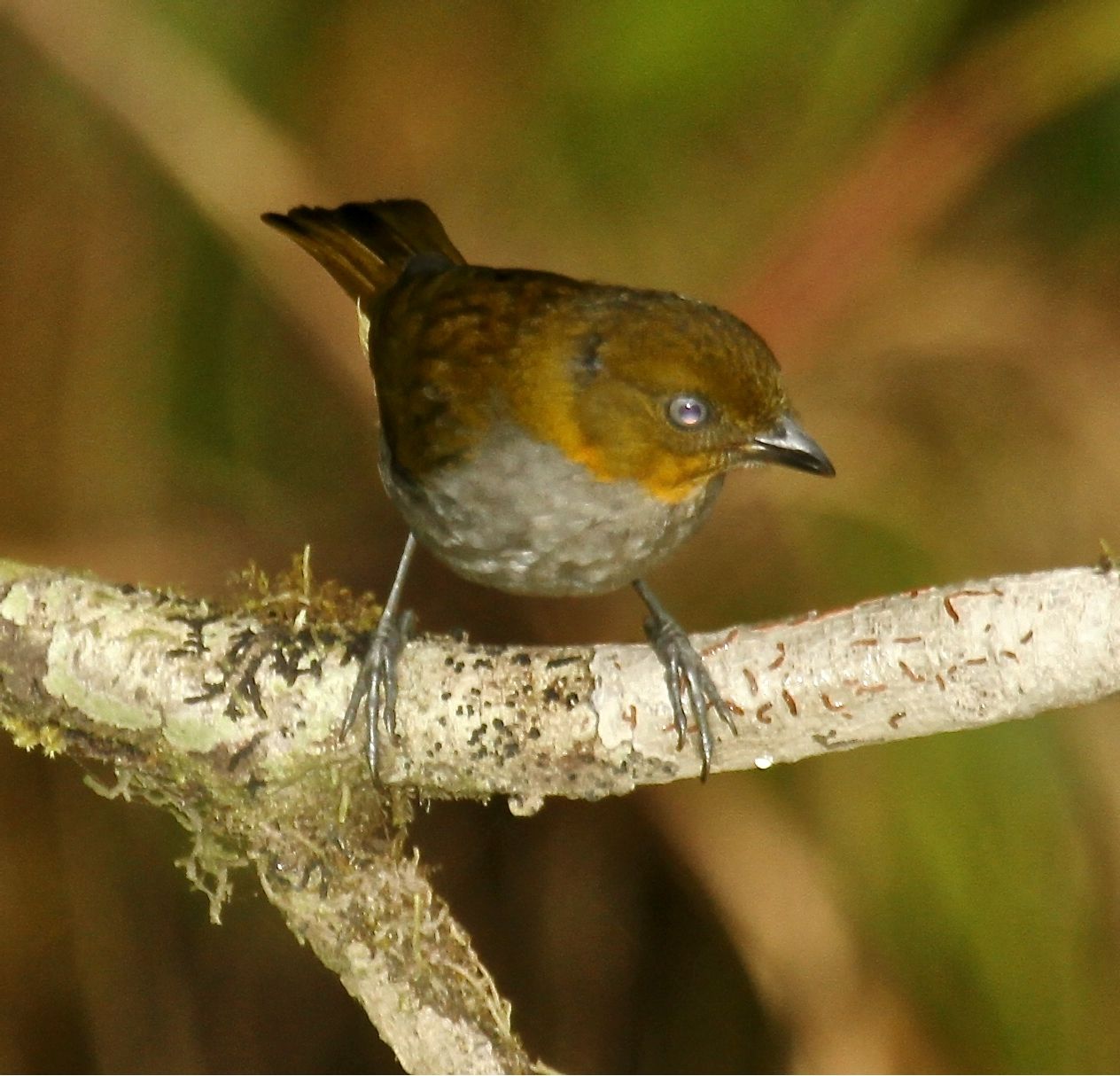

Conservation status
- Least Concern (IUCN 3.1)

Scientific classification
- Kingdom: Animalia
- Phylum: Chordata
- Class: Aves
- Order: Passeriformes
- Family: Passerellidae
- Genus: Chlorospingus
- Species: C. parvirostris

Binomial name
- Chlorospingus parvirostris Chapman, 1901

= Yellow-whiskered chlorospingus =

Species of bird

The yellow-whiskered chlorospingus (Chlorospingus parvirostris) is a species of bird in the family Passerellidae, the New World sparrows. It is found in Bolivia, Colombia, Ecuador, and Peru. Some taxonomic systems call it the short-billed chlorospingus.

== Taxonomy and systematics ==
The yellow-whiskered chlorospingus has a complicated taxonomic history. It was formally described in 1901 as a subspecies of the yellow-throated chlorospingus with the binomial C. flavigularis parvirostris. It retained that position through the middle of the twentieth century before being recognized as a full species.

Until the early twenty-first century genus Chlorospingus was treated as a member of the family Thraupidae, the "true" tanagers, though its placement within the family was uncertain. Based on studies published in 2002, 2003, and 2007, beginning in 2010 taxonomic systems transferred Chlorospingus to its present sparrow family. The Chlorospingus species were originally called "bush tanagers" or "bush-tanagers". Beginning in 2013 systems began changing the English name of the members of the genus to "chlorospingus" because they were no longer considered tanagers.

The yellow-whiskered chlorospingus has these three subspecies:

- C. p. huallagae Carriker, 1933
- C. p. medianus Zimmer, JT, 1947
- C. p. parvirostris Chapman, 1901

== Description ==
The yellow-whiskered chlorospingus is about 14 cm (5.5 in) long and weighs 17.5 to 28.5 g (0.62 to 1.0 oz). The sexes have the same plumage. Adults of the nominate subspecies C. p. parvirostris have an olive-green crown, face, nape, upperparts, and tail. Their flight feathers are dusky with olive edges. The center of their throat is pale gray and the sides bright yellow that flares back and up onto the neck, forming the eponymous "whiskers". Most of the rest of their underparts are gray with olive-yellow undertail coverts. Subspecies C. p. huallagae has slightly browner upperparts than the nominate. Their "whiskers" are mustard-yellow. The center of their throat and their breast and belly are smoky brownish gray. C. p. medianus is intermediate between the other two subspecies. All subspecies have a yellowish white to light gray iris, a dusky bill, and dark gray legs and feet.

== Distribution and habitat ==
The yellow-whiskered chlorospingus has a disjunct distribution; each subspecies is separate from the others. The subspecies are found thus:

- C. p. huallagae: eastern slope of Colombia's Eastern Andes and south on the eastern slope through Ecuador into northwestern Peru along the border area of Pirua and Cajamarca departments
- C. p. medianus: eastern slope of Peruvian Andes from southern Amazonas Department to northern Huánuco Department
- C. p. parvirostris: eastern Andean slope from southern Huánuco south into Bolivia as far as western Cochabamba Department

The yellow-whiskered chlorospingus inhabits humid to wet subtropical forest, especially in areas laden with moss and epiphytes. At least in Ecuador it favors the forest's lower to middle zones and its edges. It ranges in elevation between 1,300 and 2,400 m (4,300 and 7,900 ft) in Colombia, mostly between 1,200 and 2,250 m (3,900 and 7,400 ft) in Ecuador, and between 1,100 and 2,750 m (3,600 and 9,000 ft) in Peru.

== Behavior ==
=== Movement ===
The yellow-whiskered chlorospingus is a year-round resident.

=== Feeding ===
The yellow-whiskered chlorospingus feeds on berries, fruit, and arthropods. It forages in pairs or groups of up to about eight individuals and regularly joins mixed-species feeding flocks.

=== Breeding ===
The breeding season of the yellow-whiskered chlorospingus is imperfectly known but appears to span from September to June. Its nest is a large shallow cup made from plant material. Nests have been found on mossy rock ledges above streams and in vegetation on cliff faces. The eggs are pale salmon to buff-white with red-brown and lavender markings. The clutch size, incubation period, time to fledging, and details of parental care are not known.

=== Vocalization ===
The song of the yellow-whiskered chlorospingus has not been put into words. Its calls are describes as "a tsrreet note" and "a modulated, high tsrrree".

== Status ==
The IUCN has assessed the yellow-whiskered chlorospingus as being of Least Concern. It has a large range; its population size is not known and is believed to be decreasing. No immediate threats have been identified. It is considered common in Colombia and "locally fairly common" in Peru. Though its overall range extends the length of Ecuador it is well known from only a few locations along it. It is thought to occur in at least one national park in each country. "Within its range considerable intact forest exists, but [its] habitat [is] under assault in many areas from deforestation and human settlement."
