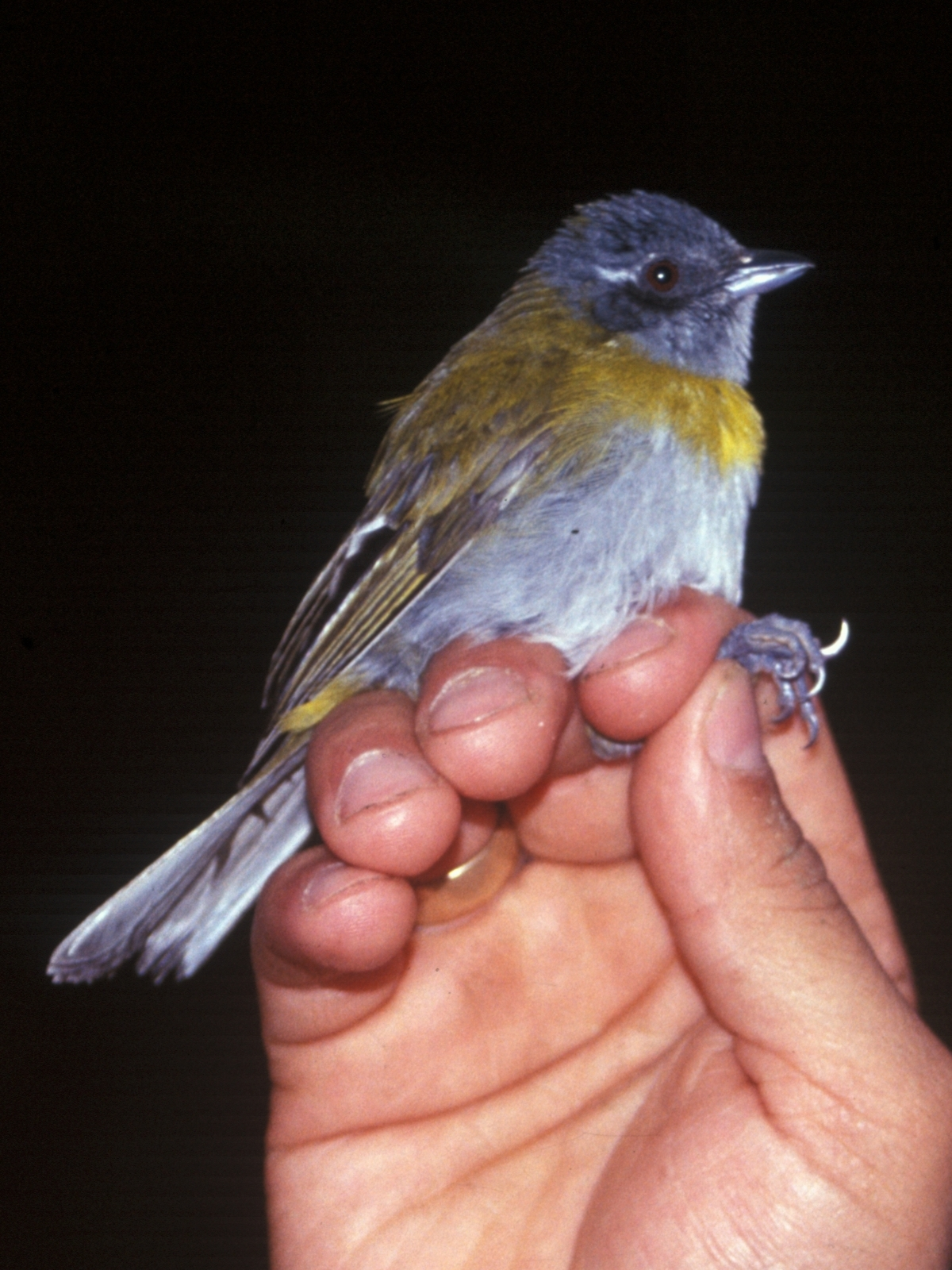
- From Cordillera del Cóndor, Ecuador

Conservation status
- Least Concern (IUCN 3.1)

Scientific classification
- Kingdom: Animalia
- Phylum: Chordata
- Class: Aves
- Order: Passeriformes
- Family: Passerellidae
- Genus: Chlorospingus
- Species: C. canigularis

Binomial name
- Chlorospingus canigularis (Lafresnaye, 1848)

= Ashy-throated chlorospingus =

Species of bird

The ashy-throated chlorospingus (Chlorospingus canigularis) or ashy-throated bush tanager, is a species of bird in the family Passerellidae, the New World sparrows. It is found in Colombia, Costa Rica, Ecuador, Panama, Peru, and Venezuela.

== Taxonomy and systematics ==
The ashy-throated chlorospingus has a complicated taxonomic history. It was formally described in 1848 with the binomial Tachyphonus canigularis. It eventually was reassigned to the genus Chlorospingus that had been erected in 1851. Both Tachyphonus and Chlorospingus were at the time members of the family Thraupidae, the "true" tanagers, though their positions within the family were uncertain. Based on studies published in 2002, 2003, and 2007, beginning in 2010 taxonomic systems transferred Chlorospingus to its present sparrow family. The Chlorospingus species were originally called "bush tanagers" or "bush-tanagers". Beginning in 2013 systems began changing the English name of the members of the genus to "chlorospingus" because they were no longer considered tanagers.

The ashy-throated chlorospingus has these five subspecies:

- C. c. olivaceiceps Underwood, 1898
- C. c. canigularis (Lafresnaye, 1848)
- C. c. conspicillatus Todd, 1922
- C. c. paulus Zimmer, JT, 1947
- C. c. signatus Taczanowski & Berlepsch, 1885

At least one twentieth-century publication suggested that C. c. olivaceiceps deserved recognition as a full species. The Clements taxonomy recognizes it as the "ashy-throated chlorospingus (olive-crowned)" and groups the other four subspecies as the "ashy-throated chlorospingus (ashy-throated)".

== Description ==
The ashy-throated chlorospingus is 13 to 14 cm (5.1 to 5.5 in) long and weighs 14.5 to 21 g (0.51 to 0.74 oz). The sexes have the same plumage. Adults of the nominate subspecies C. c. canigularis have a mostly gray head with slightly darker ear coverts and a grayish white throat. They have a wide light yellow band across the chest that continues with an olive tinge along the sides and flanks. The centers of their breast and belly are whitish to grayish white and their undertail coverts olive-yellow.

The other subspecies of the ashy-throated chlorospingus differ from the nominate and each other thus:

- C. c. olivaceiceps: olive rather than gray head
- C. c. conspicillatus: wider and slightly darker chest band and slightly more olive sides and flanks
- C. c. paulus: like conspicillatus but with ear coverts the same gray as the rest of the head
- C. c. signatus: slightly darker gray head with thin white stripe from the eye to the nape

All subspecies have a reddish brown iris, a dusky maxilla, usually a pale steel-gray mandible, and dark gray legs and feet.

== Distribution and habitat ==
The ashy-throated chlorospingus has a highly disjunct distribution. No two subspecies have contiguous ranges and some have gaps within their range. The subspecies are found thus:

- C. c. olivaceiceps: Costa Rica on eastern slope of volcanoes in Central Valley and in upper watershed of Reventazón River; western Panama between Bocas del Toro and Veraguas provinces
- C. c. canigularis: from southern Táchira state in western Venezuela south along the western slope of Colombia's Eastern Andes
- C. c. conspicillatus: both slopes of Colombia's Central and Western Andes
- C. c. paulus: western slope of Andes from northern Ecuador's western Pichincha Province south into far northwestern Peru's Tumbes Department; locally in coastal mountains in Ecuador's southern Manabí and northern Santa Elena provinces
- C. c. signatus: eastern slope of Andes from northern Ecuador's Napo Province south and intermittently through Peru to northern Puno Department

The ashy-throated chlorospingus inhabits lowland and tropical evergreen forest and tropical deciduous forest. It favors wet forest heavy with moss and is found mostly in the forest canopy and its edges. It ranges in elevation between 400 and 1,200 m (1,300 and 3,900 ft) in Costa Rica, between 1,200 and 2,000 m (3,900 and 6,600 ft) in Colombia, mostly between 700 and 1,300 m (2,300 and 4,300 ft) in western Ecuador and between 1,000 and 1,900 m (3,300 and 6,200 ft) in the east, mostly between 1,000 and 1,800 m (3,300 and 5,900 ft) in Peru but only at about 750 m (2,500 ft) in Tumbes, and between 1,250 and 2,000 m (4,100 and 6,600 ft) in Venezuela.

== Behavior ==
=== Movement ===
The ashy-throated chlorospingus is a year-round resident.

=== Feeding ===
The ashy-throated chlorospingus' diet is not well known but does include fruits. It forages in pairs or groups of up to about ten individuals and regularly joins mixed-species feeding flocks.

=== Breeding ===
The ashy-throated chlorospingus' breeding seasons have not been defined but there is evidence that in Colombia it includes March to May and September. Nothing else is known about the species' breeding biology.

=== Vocalization ===
In Peru, subspecies C. c. signatus of the ashy-throated chlorospingus sings "an accelerating series of high chipping notes that falls, then rises in pitch". There its call is "a dry, metallic tik, usually given in a stuttered series". In Colombia the species sings "tsuk...tsuk...chit-chit chi’t’t’t’t’t’t’a’a’a’a’i’i’it’it-tit, [the] trill rising slightly, then descending, and rising again at [the] end". In Costa Rica what is thought to be its song is "a sibilant, slightly ascending tse tse tse tsee"; its calls there are "a high, thin, sharp, penetrating zeezít or dzee dzít, [and] sometimes zee zee zít"”. In Venezuela the species "gives thin chipping and rapid chittering notes when foraging".

== Status ==
The IUCN has assessed the ashy-throated chlorospingus as being of Least Concern. It has a very large range; its population of at least 500,000 mature individuals is believed to be decreasing. No immediate threats have been identified. The species is considered very uncommon in Costa Rica, fairly common in Colombia, "locally fairly common, but very patchily distributed" in Peru, and "uncommon to locally fairly common" in its small Venezuelan range. "Although it is not currently at risk, the middle-Andean elevations favoured by this species are often subject to intensive colonization pressure, which could eventually pose a threat at a local scale."
