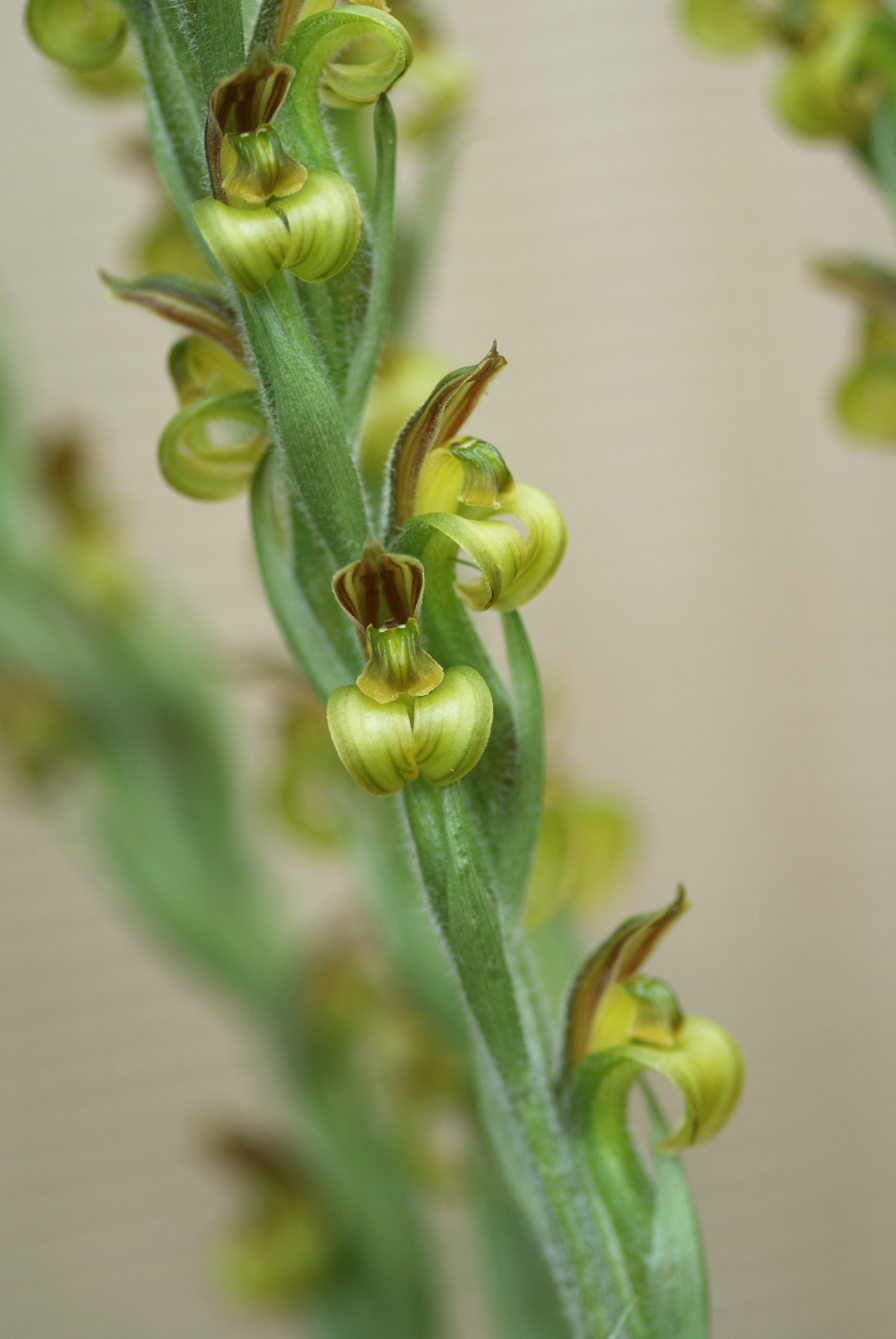
- Sarcoglottis speciosa

Scientific classification
- Kingdom: Plantae
- Clade: Tracheophytes
- Clade: Angiosperms
- Clade: Monocots
- Order: Asparagales
- Family: Orchidaceae
- Subfamily: Orchidoideae
- Tribe: Cranichideae
- Subtribe: Spiranthinae
- Genus: Sarcoglottis; C.Presl

Synonyms
- Dothilis Raf.; Narica Raf.; Potosia (Schltr.) R.González & Szlach. ex Mytnik; Synoplectris Raf.; Zhukowskia Szlach., R.González & Rutk.

= Sarcoglottis =

Genus of flowering plants

Sarcoglottis is a genus of flowering plants from the orchid family, Orchidaceae. It is widespread across much of Latin America from Mexico to Argentina, with one species extending northward into Trinidad and the Windward Islands.

== Species ==
As of August 2023, Plants of the World Online accepted the following species:

- Sarcoglottis acaulis (Sm.) Schltr. – from Grenada and Trinidad to Bolivia
- Sarcoglottis acutata (Rchb.f. & Warm.) Garay – Minas Gerais
- Sarcoglottis alexandri Schltr. ex Mansf. – São Paulo, Paraná
- Sarcoglottis amazonica Pabst – Brazil, Suriname, French Guiana
- Sarcoglottis assurgens (Rchb.f.) Schltr . – Chiapas, Oaxaca, Campeche, Yucatán, Guatemala
- Sarcoglottis biflora (Vell.) Schltr. – Brazil
- Sarcoglottis calcicola Bogarín & Pupulin
- Sarcoglottis catharinensis Mancinelli & E.C.Smidt
- Sarcoglottis cerina (Lindl.) P.N.Don in J.Donn – Oaxaca, Veracruz, Chiapas, Guatemala, El Salvador
- Sarcoglottis curvisepala Szlach. & Rutk. – Bahia, Minas Gerais
- Sarcoglottis degranvillei Szlach. & Veyret – French Guiana
- Sarcoglottis depinctrix Christenson & Toscano – Espírito Santo, Rio de Janeiro
- Sarcoglottis fasciculata (Vell.) Schltr. – Brazil, Argentina, Paraguay
- Sarcoglottis glaucescens Schltr. – Rio Grande do Sul
- Sarcoglottis gonzalezii L.C.Menezes – Minas Gerais
- Sarcoglottis grandiflora (Hook.) Klotzsch – widespread across much of South America
- Sarcoglottis heringeri Pabst – Brasília
- Sarcoglottis herzogii Schltr. – Bolivia
- Sarcoglottis homalogastra (Rchb.f. & Warm.) Schltr. – Colombia, Peru, Brazil, Paraguay, Argentina
- Sarcoglottis hunteriana Schltr.
- Sarcoglottis itararensis (Kraenzl.) Hoehne – Paraná
- Sarcoglottis juergensii Schltr. – Minas Gerais
- Sarcoglottis labiosa Sambin & Aucourd
- Sarcoglottis lehmannii Garay – Colombia
- Sarcoglottis lobata (Lindl.) P.N.Don in J.Donn – Hidalgo
- Sarcoglottis maasorum Pabst
- Sarcoglottis magdalenensis (Brade & Pabst) Pabst – Brazil, Argentina
- Sarcoglottis maroaensis G.A.Romero & Carnevali – Venezuela
- Sarcoglottis matogrossensis Engels & E.C.Smidt
- Sarcoglottis metallica (Rolfe) Schltr. – Colombia, Venezuela, Guyana
- Sarcoglottis micrantha Christenson – Peru
- Sarcoglottis neglecta Christenson – Peru, Colombia, Panama, Costa Rica
- Sarcoglottis neillii Salazar & Tobar
- Sarcoglottis pauciflora (Kuntze) Schltr. – central and southern Mexico, Guatemala, El Salvador, Honduras
- Sarcoglottis portillae Christenson – Ecuador
- Sarcoglottis powellii Schltr.
- Sarcoglottis pseudovillosa Mytnik, Rutk. & Szlach. – Paraguay
- Sarcoglottis retorta Sambin & Aucourd
- Sarcoglottis riocontensis E.C.Smidt & Toscano – Bahia
- Sarcoglottis rosulata (Lindl.) P.N.Don in J.Donn – Guatemala, El Salvador, Honduras, Belize, Oaxaca
- Sarcoglottis sceptrodes (Rchb.f.) Schltr – from central Mexico south to Panama
- Sarcoglottis schaffneri (Rchb.f.) Ames in J.D.Smith – from central Mexico south to Honduras
- Sarcoglottis schwackei (Cogn.) Schltr. – Brazil
- Sarcoglottis scintillans (E.W.Greenw.) Salazar & Soto Arenas – Oaxaca
- Sarcoglottis smithii (Rchb.f.) Schltr. – Nicaragua, Costa Rica
- Sarcoglottis stergiosii Carnevali & I.Ramírez – Colombia, Venezuela, Guyana
- Sarcoglottis tirolensis Burns–Bal. & Merc.S.Foster – Paraguay
- Sarcoglottis turkeliae Christenson – Ecuador
- Sarcoglottis uliginosa Barb.Rodr. – Brazil, Argentina, Paraguay
- Sarcoglottis umbrosa (Barb.Rodr.) Schltr. – Brazil
- Sarcoglottis ventricosa (Vell.) Hoehne – Brazil, Argentina
- Sarcoglottis veyretiae Szlach. – Rio de Janeiro
- Sarcoglottis villosa (Poepp. & Endl.) Schltr. – Brazil, Peru
- Sarcoglottis viscosa Szlach. & Rutk. – Brazil
- Sarcoglottis woodsonii (L.O.Williams) Garay – Panama

== See also ==
- List of Orchidaceae genera
