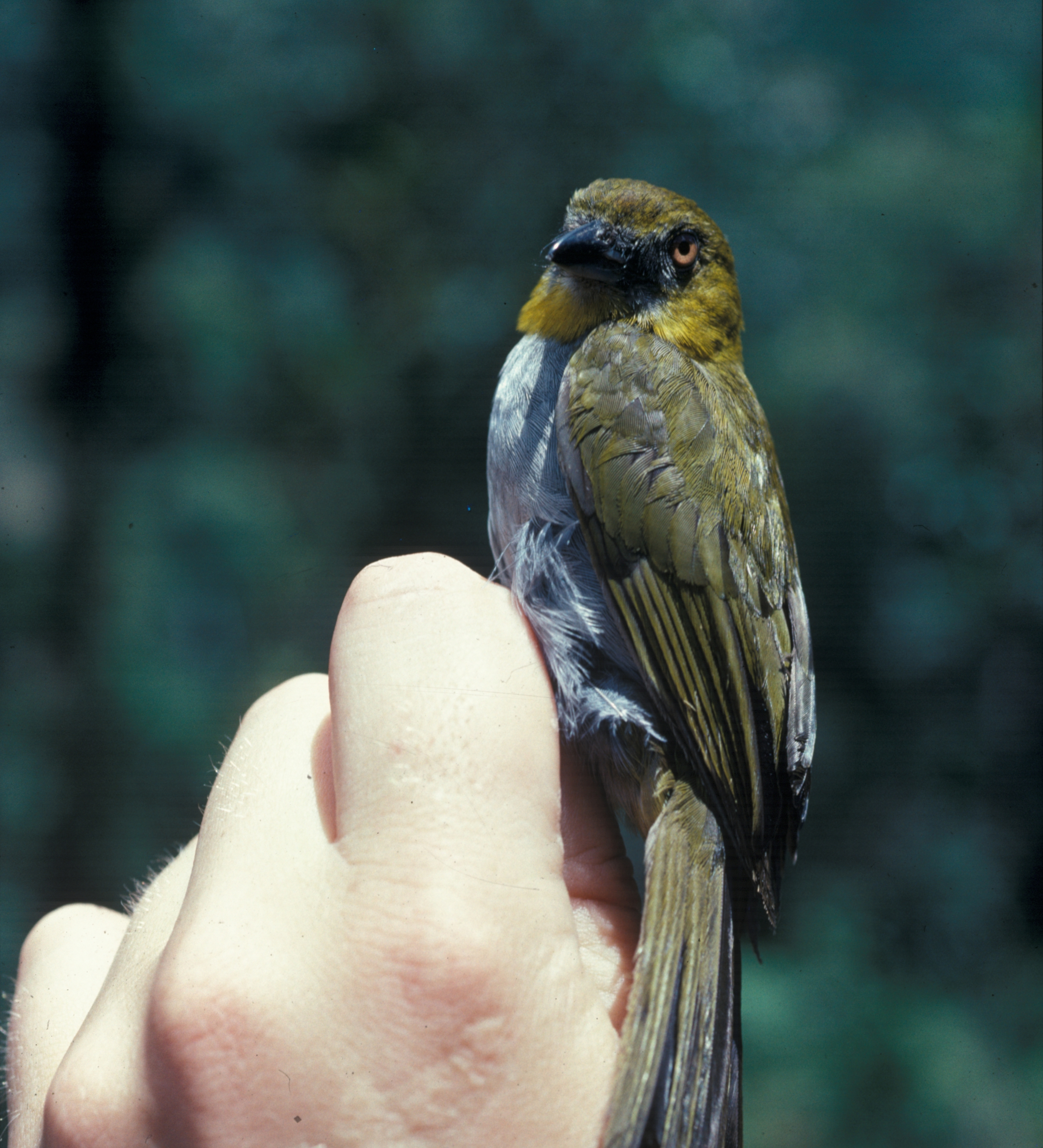

Conservation status
- Least Concern (IUCN 3.1)

- Least Concern (IUCN 3.1)

Scientific classification
- Kingdom: Animalia
- Phylum: Chordata
- Class: Aves
- Order: Passeriformes
- Family: Passerellidae
- Genus: Chlorospingus
- Species: C. flavigularis

Binomial name
- Chlorospingus flavigularis (Sclater, PL, 1852)

Synonyms
- Ranges of C. f. martinatus and C. f. flavigularis. (See the taxonomy and distribution sections.)

= Yellow-throated chlorospingus =

Species of bird

The yellow-throated chlorospingus or yellow-throated bush tanager (Chlorospingus flavigularis) is a species of bird in the family Passerellidae, the New World sparrows. It is found in Colombia, Ecuador, Panama, and Peru.

== Taxonomy and systematics ==
The yellow-throated chlorospingus has a complicated taxonomic history. It was formally described in 1852 with the binomial Pipilopsis flavigularis. It was eventually reassigned to genus Chlorospingus that had been erected in 1851. From its description until the early twenty-first century genus Chlorospingus was treated as a member of the family Thraupidae, the "true" tanagers, though its placement within the family was uncertain. Based on studies published in 2002, 2003, and 2007, beginning in 2010 taxonomic systems transferred Chlorospingus to its present sparrow family. The Chlorospingus species were originally called "bush tanagers" or "bush-tanagers". Beginning in 2013 systems began changing the English name of the members of the genus to "chlorospingus" because they were no longer considered tanagers.

The yellow-throated chlorospingus' further taxonomy is unsettled. The American Ornithological Society, the IOC, AviList, the Clements taxonomy assign it these three subspecies:

- C. f. hypophaeus Sclater, PL & Salvin, 1868
- C. f. marginatus Chapman, 1914
- C. f. flavigularis (Sclater, PL, 1852)

However, as of late 2025 BirdLife International's Handbook of the Birds of the World (HBW) treats C. f. hypophaeus as a separate species, the "orange-throated chlorospingus", and confusingly retains the name "yellow-throated chlorospingus" for the remaining two subspecies. The Clements taxonomy recognizes some differences within the species, calling hypophaeus the "yellow-throated chlorospingus (drab-throated)" and groups the other two subspecies as the "yellow-throated chlorospingus (yellow-throated)".

Through the middle of the twentieth century what is now the yellow-whiskered chlorospingus (C. parvirostris) was treated as another subspecies of C. flavigularis.

This article follows the one-species, three-subspecies model.

== Description ==
The two subspecies of the "yellow-throated" group of the yellow-throated chlorospingus are about 15 cm (5.9 in) long and weigh 21.5 to 31 g (0.76 to 1.1 oz). The sexes have the same plumage. Adults of the nominate subspecies C. f. flavigularis have gray lores. Their rest of their face and their crown, nape, upperparts, and tail are yellowish olive. Their flight feathers are dusky with dull yellow edges. Their throat is yellow, with the color extending sideways onto the neck. The rest of their underparts are pale gray that is lightest on the belly center and has an olive tinge on the flanks and undertail coverts. They have a hazel iris, a dusky maxilla, a grayish mandible with a dusky tip, and dark gray legs and feet. Subspecies C. f. marginatus has a brownish gray center of the throat with yellow edges; its underparts are also brownish gray. Its iris is gray.

Subspecies C. f. hypophaeus is smaller and lighter than the nominate and marginatus. It is about 12 to 13 cm (4.7 to 5.1 in) long and weighs 15 to 20 g (0.53 to 0.71 oz). Adults have gray lores. Their rest of their face and their crown, nape, upperparts, and tail are brownish olive to yellowish green. Their flight feathers are dusky with dull yellow edges. Their throat is orange-yellow, their breast brownish to pinkish buff, their sides and flanks grayish olive, and the rest of their underparts whitish. They have a dark iris, a dusky maxilla, a grayish mandible with a dusky tip, and dark gray legs and feet.

== Distribution and habitat ==
The yellow-throated chlorospingus has a disjunct distribution. Each subspecies is separate from the others and some have gaps within their overall range. Subspecies C. f. hypophaeus is the northernmost of the three. It is found in Panama from Bocas del Toro Province to Coclé Province and separately in western Guna Yala (formerly called San Blas Province). It also apparently is found on Cerro Tacarcuna in extreme northwestern Colombia on the Panama border. Subspecies C. f. marginatus is found intermittently on the western slope of Colombia's Western Andes from Valle del Cauca Department south and continuing essentially continuously along the western slope in Ecuador to El Oro Province. The nominate subspecies is found in the far northern end of Colombia's Western Andes, on both slopes of the Central Andes in Antioquia Department, and on the eastern slope of the Eastern Andes from Boyacá Department south. Its range continues south on the eastern Andean slope through Ecuador and intermittently in Peru to Puno Department. It is also found on the isolated Serranía de San Lucas in northern Colombia.

The yellow-throated chlorospingus inhabits montane and lowland evergreen forest and secondary forest in the tropical and lower subtropical zones. In most areas it tends to favor the forest understory and its edges. In Panama it ranges in elevation between about 240 and 900 m (800 and 3,000 ft), but mostly above 450 m (1,500 ft). It occurs between 600 and 2,000 m (2,000 and 6,600 ft) in Colombia, mostly between 700 and 1,800 m (2,300 and 5,900 ft) in Ecuador, and between 750 and 1,800 m (2,500 and 5,900 ft) in Peru.

== Behavior ==
=== Movement ===
All subspecies of the yellow-throated chlorospingus are year-round residents.

=== Feeding ===
The two South American subspecies of the yellow-throated chlorospingus feed on berries, fruit, and insects. They forage in pairs or groups of up to about 12 and often join mixed-species feeding flocks. They forages mostly in the forest's lower to middle levels but do ascend higher at times. It takes most food by gleaning from leaves, branches, moss, and vines while perched. The diet of C. f. hypophaeus has not been studied but is assumed to be similar to that of the other subspecies. It tends to forage higher than the others but otherwise in the same manner.

=== Breeding ===
The breeding seasons of the South American subspecies of the yellow-throated chlorospingus are not defined. However, breeding evidence has been observed in Colombia during February, April, June, September, and October. August and December were represented in Ecuador. The species' nest is a cup made from moss interwoven with ferns, twigs, and rootlets. They have been found between 1 and 15 m (3 and 49 ft) above the ground. All known clutches were of two or three eggs that are whitish with darker markings. The incubation period is 16 to 18 days and fledging occurs about 14 days after hatch. The female alone is thought to incubate but further details of parental care are not known. Nothing is known about the breeding biology of subspecies C. f. hypophaeus.

=== Vocalization ===
The dawn song of the yellow-throated chlorospingus in Colombia is "a short, weak and high-pitched chit, twee-twee-twee-twit in [a] steady series of more or less alternating notes". On the western slope in Ecuador it is "a monotonous series of high-pitched tsit notes at a rate of about 2/second" and on the eastern slope "a steady series of 2 alternating notes, tsuw-tseét, tsuw-tseét...". In Peru it is similarly described as "a monotonous series of two high, ringing notes: swee tew swee tew swee tew...". The calls in those countries include "high chip notes" while foraging and "chip and seet notes" among flock members. The song of C. f. hypophaeus has not been put into words. Its calls are "sharp metallic shrt” notes, given singly or run together in series, or a sharp, sibilant jeet or pseet".

== Status ==
The IUCN follows HBW taxonomy and so has separately evaluated the "orange-throated chlorospingus" and "yellow-throated chlorospingus" sensu stricto. Both are assessed as being of Least Concern. Their population sizes are not known but are believed to be stable. No immediate threats to either have been identified. Subspecies C. f. hypophaeus is described by different sources as "fairly common to locally very common, to uncommon and local". It is found in one national park. The other two subspecies are considered common in Colombia and Ecuador, and the nominate is fairly common in Peru. They occur in several protected areas. "The lower-elevation slopes where this species occurs, in many areas, face the greatest pressure from human colonization and deforestation, although there appears to be considerable intact habitat that is reasonably secure in at least the short term."
