= Field mark =

Characteristic useful for species identification

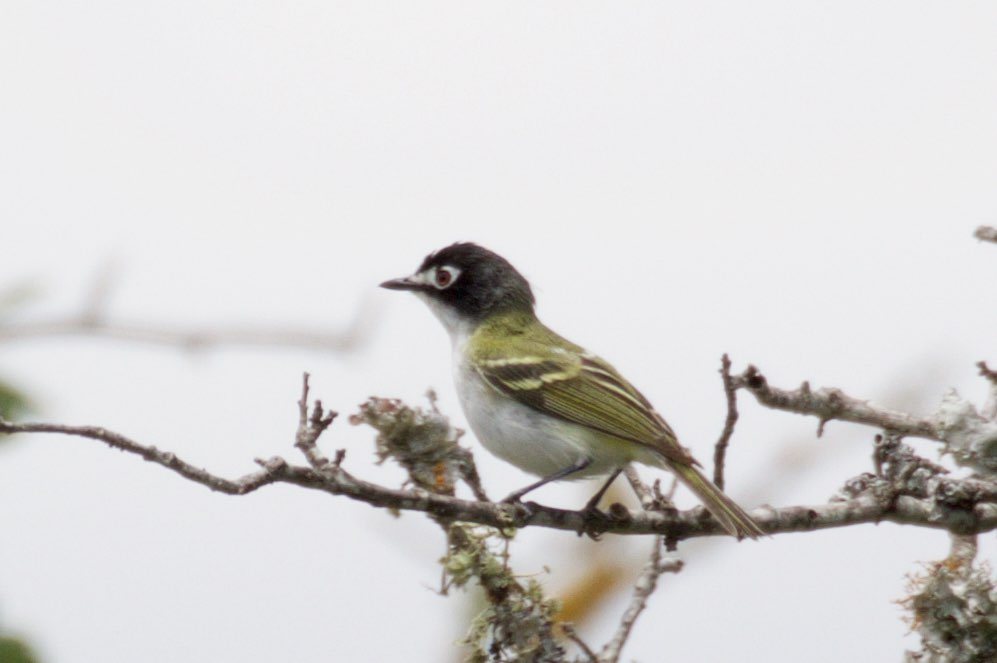
The "spectacles" of a black-capped vireo are considered a distinguishing field mark

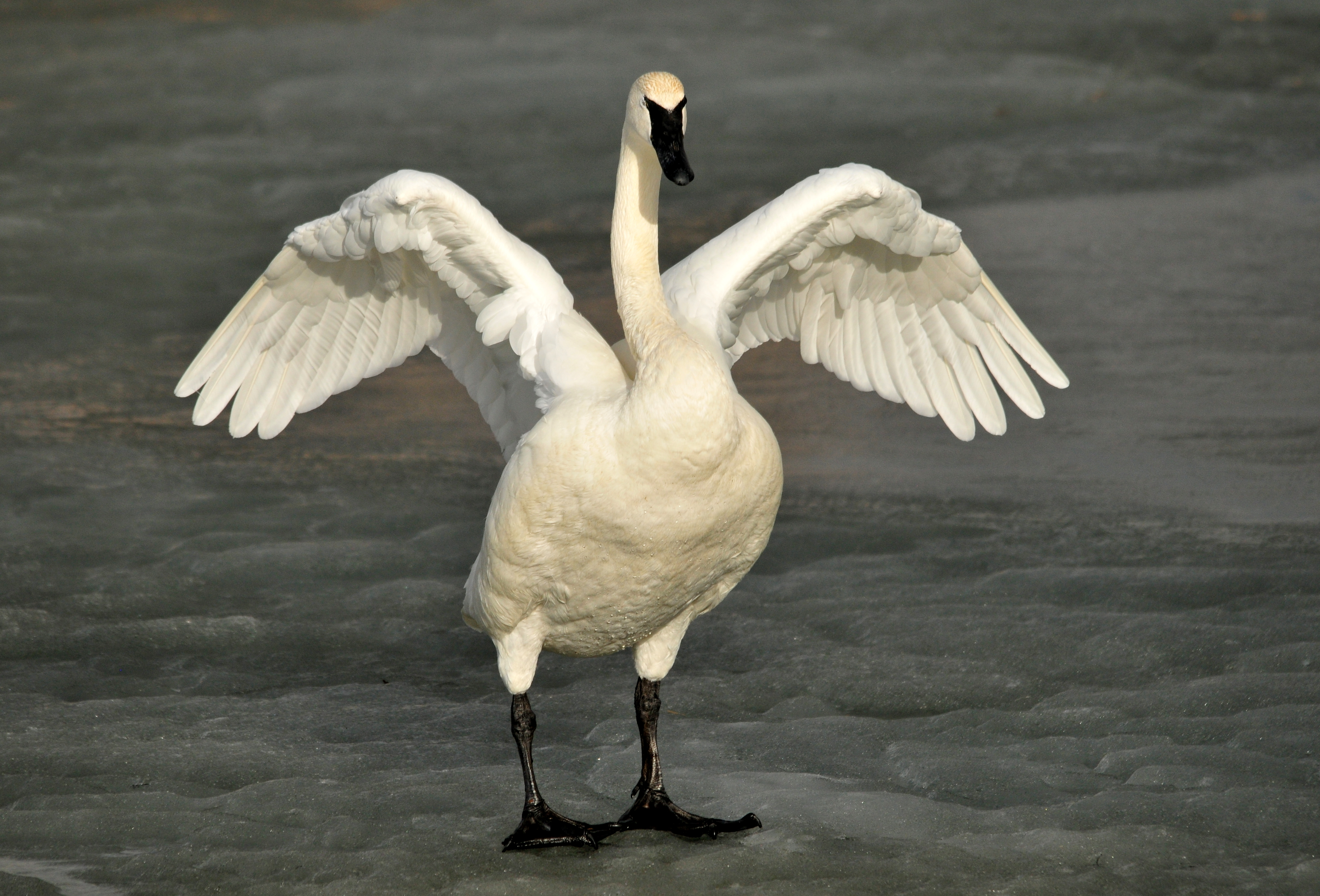
The sharp, "V-shaped" intersection of forehead and bill is a key distinguishing feature of the trumpeter swan, pictured, from its congener tundra swan (which sports a "U-shaped" intersection)

A field mark is a characteristic (e.g. in plumage) useful for species identification, usually birds. They are often used in field guides or identification keys. Field marks generally refer to distinct diagnostic differences in plumage. In a broader context, a field mark might be referred to as a character (e.g. "differential character" or "diagnostic character"). For birds this may include plumage, but also flight characteristics, size, call, behaviour, or other characteristics which aid in identification. As opposed to in-hand marks, distinguishable when a specimen is held in the hand, field marks are especially those marks that remain useful in less than optimal conditions, for example when the subject is far removed, only partly visible or not sufficiently lit to see its colours.
