= Ludlow Griscom =

American ornithologist (1890–1959)

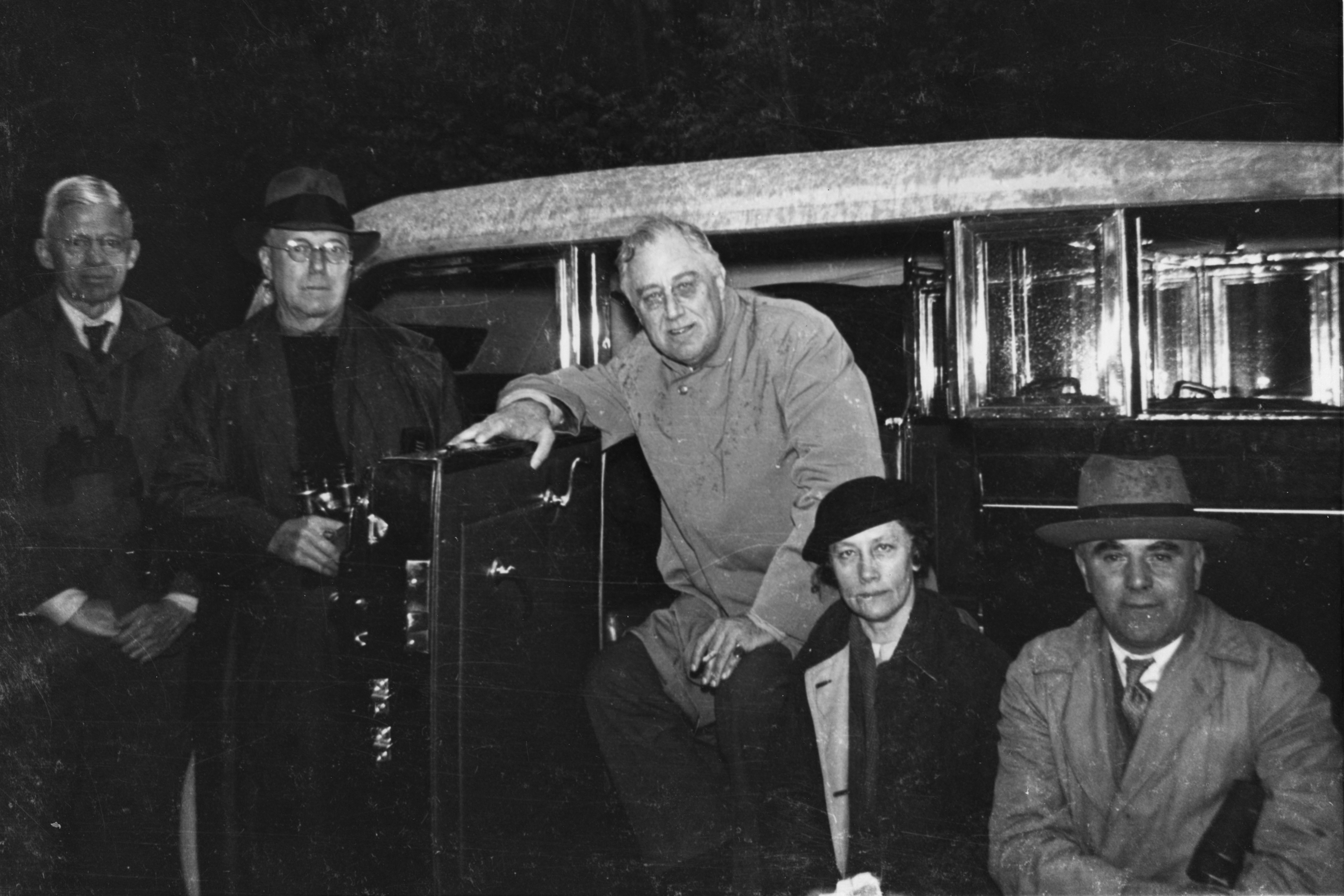
- Griscom (rightmost) with Franklin Delano Roosevelt (center) and others, May 1942
- Born: June 17, 1890; New York, New York
- Died: May 28, 1959 (aged 68); Cambridge, Massachusetts, U.S.
- Resting place: Mount Auburn Cemetery
- Education: Columbia University, Cornell University
- Known for: Identification of birds by field marks
- Scientific career
- Fields: Ornithology
- Workplaces: American Museum of Natural History, Museum of Comparative Zoology
- Academic advisors: Arthur Augustus Allen
- Author abbrev. (botany): Griscom

Ludlow Griscom (June 17, 1890 – May 28, 1959) was an American ornithologist known as a pioneer in field ornithology. His emphasis on the identification of free-flying birds by field marks became widely adopted by professionals and amateurs. Many called him "Dean of the Birdwatchers."

== Early life and family ==
Griscom was born in New York City, the son of Clement Acton Griscom Jr. and Genevieve Sprigg Ludlow. Ludlow's grandfather Clement Acton Griscom Sr. was a prominent merchant and shipping executive. His maternal grandfather, William Ludlow, distinguished himself through military service. Griscom's family traces its ancestry back to Thomas Lloyd, a 17th-century physician in Pennsylvania.

The oldest of three children, Ludlow Griscom had a sister, Joyce, who died in childhood, and a brother, Acton. As a boy, Ludlow's interest in birds showed itself as early as 1898. In 1907, he found fellow nature enthusiasts when he joined the Linnaean Society of New York.

Griscom received an A.B. degree, with a major in pre-law, from Columbia University in 1912. Despite initial resistance on the part of his parents, he entered Cornell University as a graduate student of ornithology, studying under Arthur A. Allen. Louis Agassiz Fuertes was one of his neighbors, and they became good friends. Griscom's master's thesis dealt with field identification of ducks of the eastern United States, and he received his A.M. degree from Cornell in 1915. He taught there and at the University of Virginia and continued to study toward a doctorate. However, financial pressures prevented him from completing that degree, even though his father ultimately consented to his career choice.

Griscom married Edith Sumner Sloan on September 14, 1926; the couple had three children, Edith Rapallo, Andrew, and Joan Ludlow. Griscom was an enthusiastic opera- and concert-goer and accomplished pianist.

== Career ==
=== Museum work ===
In 1916, Griscom joined the staff of the American Museum of Natural History (AMNH) in New York, initially in the ichthyology department where he co-authored one paper on fishes with John Treadwell Nichols. He transferred to the Department of Mammalogy and Ornithology the following year, where he worked for Frank Chapman, Curator of Birds. Early on, Griscom had looked to Chapman for career advice, but over time, relations between the two became strained. Blocked for further promotion, Griscom left his position as assistant curator of ornithology in 1927.

That same year, Griscom moved to Boston to become Research Curator of Zoology at Harvard University's Museum of Comparative Zoology (MCZ), where he proved to be an effective and hard-working administrator in addition to his scientific contributions. He worked closely with Thomas Barbour, the museum's director, with whom he had a warm relationship; after Barbour's death in 1946, Griscom reported to the new director, Alfred Romer. Griscom was named research ornithologist in 1948. However, Griscom's age and declining health, beginning with a stroke in 1950, led to his retirement in 1955.

=== World War I military service ===
During World War I, Griscom served as a 2nd Lieutenant (2LT) in the United States Army within the Psychological Subsection of Military Intelligence, part of the American Expeditionary Force (AEF) in France. Working under Captain Heber Blankenhorn, a pioneer of U.S. military psychological operations (PSYOP), Griscom contributed to one of the earliest organized PSYOP efforts. His duties included designing and distributing propaganda materials, such as leaflets delivered via hydrogen balloons, aimed at influencing German soldiers and civilians.

Griscom, alongside fellow PSYOP officers like 1LT Charles Merz and 2LT George Ifft II, serving as some of the first U.S. Army PSYOP officers, deployed to forward positions near Verdun, where he experienced combat conditions, including artillery fire. Even amidst the dangers of the Western Front, Griscom’s passion for ornithology endured. In a letter home, he described observing European bird species, including larks and warblers, which he marveled at as a welcome distraction from the chaos of war. These observations likely influenced his post-war ornithological pursuits.

This early PSYOP work, led by Blankenhorn, laid the groundwork for modern U.S. psychological warfare practices. Following his discharge in February 1919 after the death of his father, Griscom returned to the United States and resumed his ornithological career.

=== Professional organizations and related work ===
Griscom maintained a high level of activity in several professional organizations. He joined the American Ornithologists' Union (AOU) in 1908 and was named a fellow in 1925. As the organization shifted focus from museum collections to the study of live birds, he contributed his opinions and talents to its transition. He was elected to the Finance Committee in 1934 and later served on the council, a subcommittee for faunistics, and other committees.

Griscom's participation in the AOU was not without friction. At times, he was critical of certain AOU ways and means that he found old-fashioned, in particular the workings of the Check-List Committee; the committee in the 1940s included Alexander Wetmore and James Lee Peters. Peters, who was also Griscom's colleague at the MCZ, was in many ways the antithesis of Griscom: quietly working in the museum while Griscom attracted attention with his rapid field identifications.

Once in Boston, in 1927, Griscom joined the Nuttall Ornithological Club, a limited-membership group of ornithologists that was in certain respects a predecessor of the AOU. He was elected treasurer in 1930 (succeeding Charles Foster Batchelder), was subsequently named a member of the council, and served a term as president from 1952. He gave nearly 50 talks at the club's regularly scheduled meetings on his various field trips and on local bird distribution and migration. As at the AOU, he emphasized identification of birds by field marks rather than in the hand, and the organization's meeting minutes expanded to accommodate his notes of recent sightings.

Also in 1927, Griscom became an associate member of the New England Museum of Natural History, which was sponsored by the Boston Society of Natural History. He became chair of the Society's Budget Committee in 1937 and went on to assume more administrative and financial responsibilities. By the 1940s, the museum was in financial difficulty, and Griscom (now on the board of trustees) worked with new director Bradford Washburn to right the ship. In a controversial move, Griscom organized the sale of a portion of the Society's books (many of which were duplicated within the Boston area), with much of the library going to the University of Southern California. As the decade ended, Washburn and Griscom perceived the need to expand the museum's attendance. They reorganized the institution as the Boston Museum of Science, and with Griscom as president, the new museum opened its doors in 1951.

On the national scene, Griscom became an important member of the National Audubon Society (NAS) in both an editorial and executive capacity. He was a contributing editor to Audubon Magazine and an associate editor of Audubon Field Notes. He joined the board of directors, then became its chairman in 1944, a position he held until 1956. During this period, he worked to refine and moderate the organization's focus on conservation issues as it broadened its membership base.

Closer to home, Griscom was active with the Massachusetts Audubon Society (Mass Audubon), contributing articles, book reviews, and observational reports to its Bulletin. He served as a Director of the organization for nine years.

=== Field ornithology and birding ===
Plaque honoring Griscom at the Parker River National Wildlife Refuge, Plum Island, Massachusetts

Griscom's field work included extensive travel across the United States and several expeditions to Central and South America. For the AMNH, he worked in Nicaragua in 1917. In 1923, he explored Quebec's Gaspé Peninsula, collecting botanical specimens as well as observing birds. He led an expedition to Panama in 1924; members of the party described fifteen new species of birds while he himself published descriptions of the yellow-green brushfinch and the Tacarcuna bush-tanager. In 1925, Griscom was part of a team led by Gregory Mason and Herbert Spinden that collected specimens for the AMNH in British Honduras, the Yucatan Peninsula, and Cozumel Island. With Maunsell Crosby, he visited the Pearl Islands off Panama in 1927 and Guatemala in 1930. Griscom named two new species as a result of the Guatemala trip, the flightless Atitlán grebe (now extinct) and (with Jonathan Dwight) the belted flycatcher.

Ludlow Griscom helped to establish the now widely held view that birds can be reliably identified "in the field" by looking at field marks (distinctive plumages, behaviors, etc., that are discernible from far away) rather than "in the hand" (for example, by trapping or killing). The story is told that, as a young birder of about twenty, he impressed senior ornithologists by identifying a female Cape May warbler visually, this judgment later confirmed by shooting the bird. Griscom's and his talent led the science away from using shotguns to using binoculars. Whether or not the story of the warbler is entirely true, Griscom was indeed skilled at quickly identifying birds by sight, using diagnostic features first learned from his museum work, and he influenced other birders and ornithologists to use the same techniques. Later in his career, he wrote:

[What] people are now able to do in the way of instantly recognizing a large number of birds by song, notes, tricks of flight, shape, etc, entirely apart from their colors, seems perfectly fabulous to the uninitiated and was flatly declared to be impossible a generation ago... The battle for sight records and field identification of the living bird has been won, so far as I know, and there is no real quarrel left about what birds can be recognized alive and when this recognition can be used in scientific research.

This is not to say that Griscom never collected specimens, as he certainly did so on his Latin American expeditions. In the U.S., he estimated that he collected one bird per year between 1928 and 1945, and he held a permit for scientific collecting until 1955.

Nor did Griscom accept sight records uncritically, viewing himself as a moderate in this respect. While he encouraged amateurs to pursue birding as a sport, he considered many nonprofessionals' published accounts of sightings to be so much clutter in the scientific literature. In his Birds of the New York City Region (1923), he used only those sight records that he considered reliable, and he made the fine distinction between merely reporting an observation and accepting it as a record.

Ludlow Griscom is best remembered for his participation in and promotion of the rising practice of birding by eye and ear—watching birds as a sport. His first Christmas Bird Count was in 1908. He organized counts in the Boston area. He kept personal life and year lists: his North America species total through 1939 was 640. However, his particular passion was for Big Days, a friendly competition in which a team of birders traverses a region, intending to find and identify as many bird species as possible in a 24-hour period. One day, Griscom was able to count 160 species in coastal Massachusetts.

Griscom's Birds of the New York City Region and his works on the faunistics of Massachusetts birds were some of the first books in a new genre: birdfinding guides rather than identification guides. Working from a growing volume of sightings by skilled observers, Griscom provided in these books the details of exactly where a bird could be found in a region (for instance, a specific park or beach), at what time of year (in spring migration, for example), and in what numbers.

In preparing these works, Griscom drew in part on his own records. From 1907 until the end of his life, Griscom transcribed his field notes made during trips in the United States and overseas into a set of large ledger books. He recorded identification details of each bird species, estimated numbers of birds, observed behaviors, and made note of weather conditions. The collected sixteen volumes of these ledgers are in the collection of the Peabody Essex Museum.

In the field, Griscom is remembered by friends and students for his virtuosity in identification, enthusiasm, brusque sense of humor, and satisfaction in teaching others the pleasures of birding. He was also a field trip companion with President Franklin D. Roosevelt, who accompanied Griscom on a trip through Dutchess County, New York, in 1942.

=== Protégés ===
It can be argued that Ludlow Griscom's single most important contribution to ornithology and conservation was his influence on Roger Tory Peterson, leading to the first edition of Peterson's Field Guide to the Birds in 1934. Griscom tested Peterson's paintings for the book's publisher, Houghton Mifflin, demonstrating that the renderings provided the right details that could be used to identify birds in the field. Peterson himself wrote that his field guides were "profoundly influenced" by Griscom's teaching.

During his New York years, Griscom became a teacher to a group known as the Bronx County Bird Club, whose members included Peterson, Allan Cruickshank, and Joseph J. Hickey. In his time at Harvard, he was freshman advisor to Chandler Robbins.

Ludlow Griscom was also a mentor to Allen Morgan, a fellow director of Massachusetts Audubon Society.

=== Botany ===
A complementary field of interest for Griscom was botany. In the early 1920s, he visited Newfoundland and Quebec on several expeditions, mostly under the direction of Merritt Lyndon Fernald. He had some 40,000 sheets of pressed plants in his own herbarium and the Gray Herbarium at Harvard.

=== Hunting ===
Ludlow Griscom also enjoyed duck hunting as a sport. As in other areas, his opinions about managing game birds were moderate. He wrote favorably about game management practices in Great Britain; suggested reducing the issuance of non-resident hunting licenses; and argued for a closed season for ducks for a limited period of time, lest the birds become non-migrant and poor game.

=== Conservation ===
From his position as an eminent ornithologist and officer of organizations like NAS, Griscom was an activist on behalf of conservation issues, especially those that affected coastal Massachusetts and the Atlantic flyway. He emphasized habitat preservation (of both breeding and wintering ranges) and public education, so that conservationists, sportsmen, voters, and policymakers alike could make informed decisions; he followed a path of moderation and compromise. In 1923, he argued against a measure to promote hunting on Martha's Vineyard that would have stressed populations of the ultimately doomed heath hen. In the 1940s, he lobbied government officials, among them his friend Ira N. Gabrielson, in support of federal conservation of habitat. In particular, he argued for protection of two natural areas that would become Monomoy National Wildlife Refuge and Parker River National Wildlife Refuge, which covers most of the barrier island of Plum Island.

== Later life and death ==
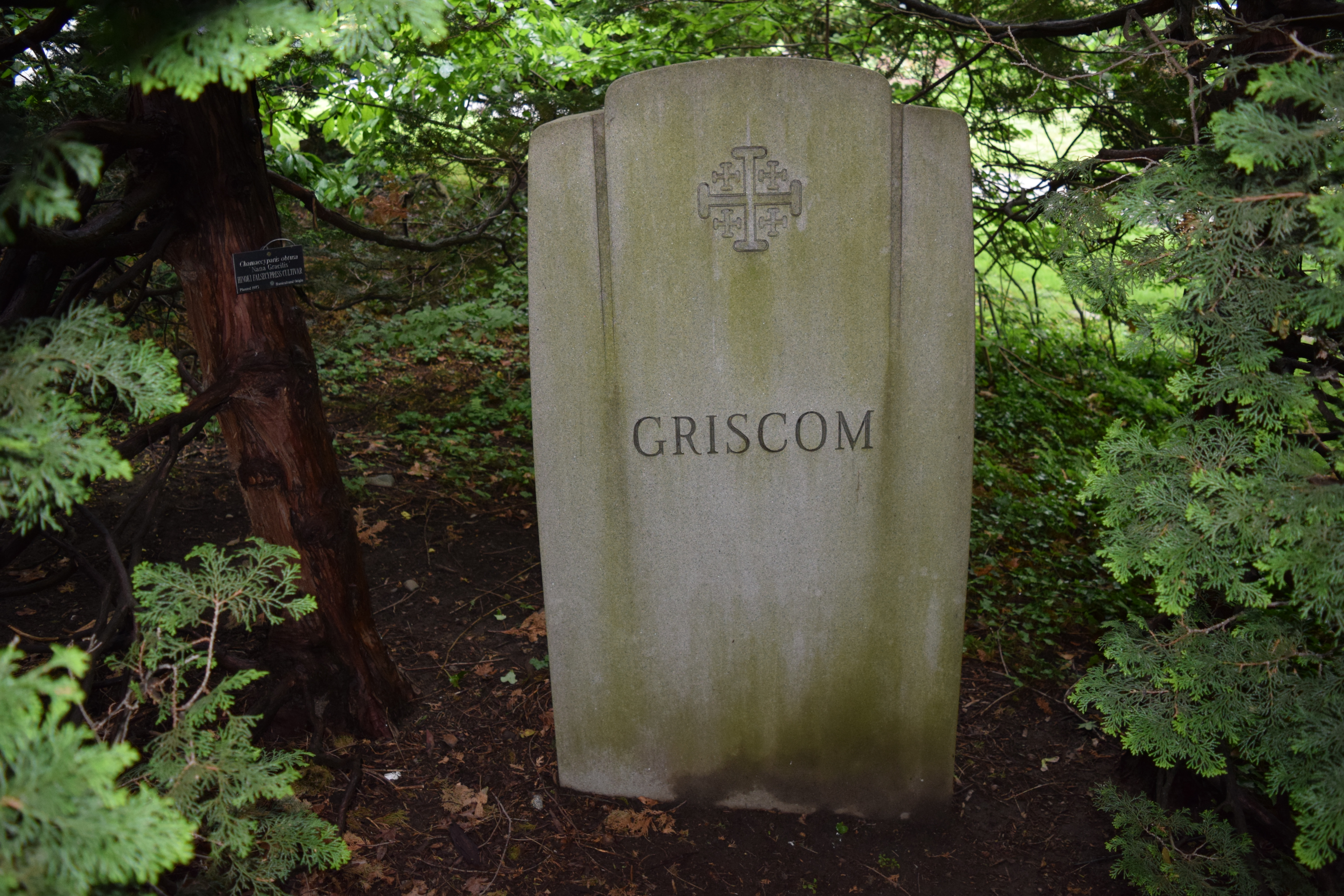
Grave marker for Ludlow and Edith Sloan Griscom, framed by Hinoki False Cypress, Mount Auburn Cemetery, Massachusetts

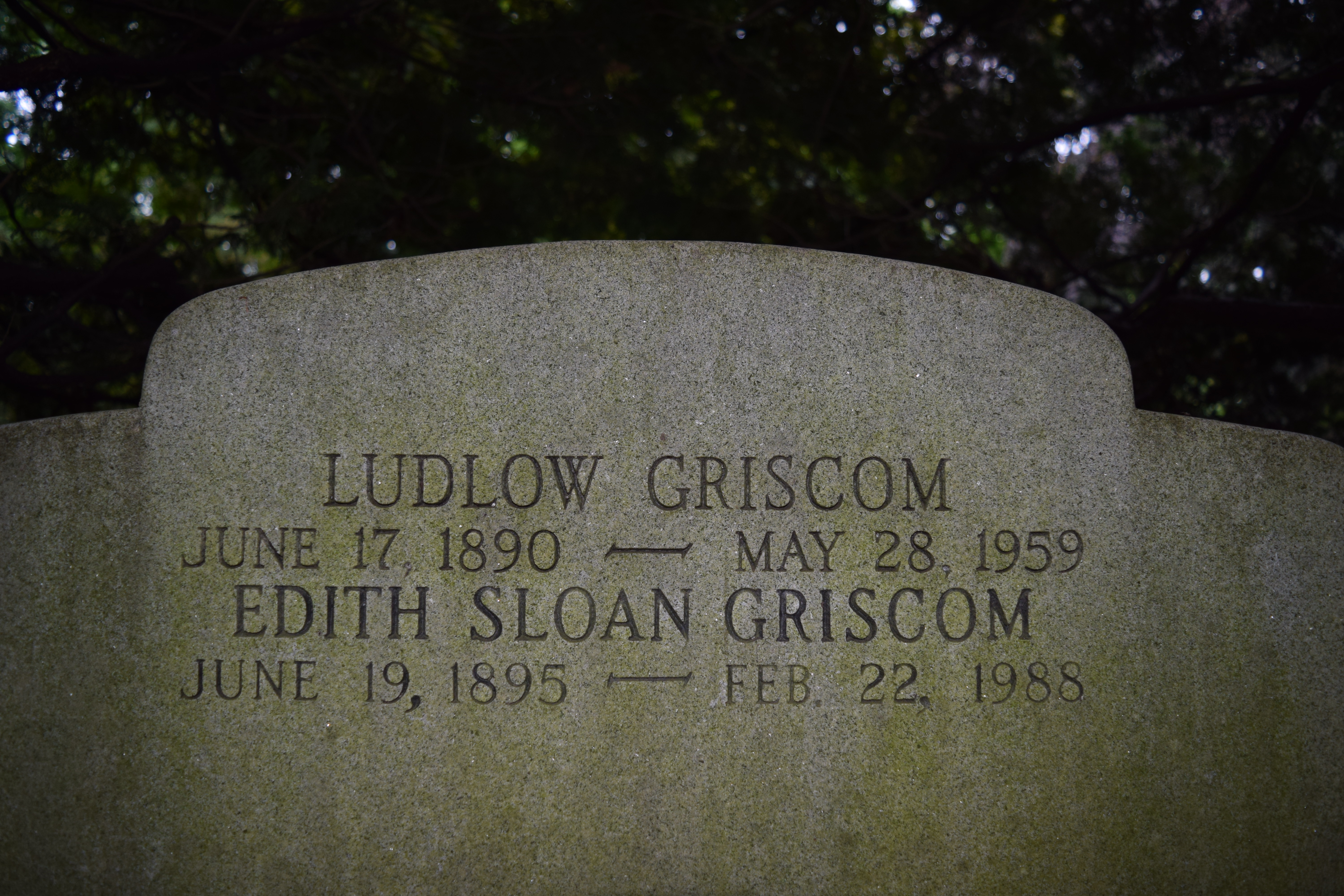
Grave marker for Ludlow and Edith Sloan Griscom (reverse), Mount Auburn Cemetery, Massachusetts

Ludlow Griscom had his first stroke in 1950, beginning a decade of failing health. He retired from Harvard and the MCZ in 1955. As a courtesy, and in recognition of his many years of service, he was elected President of the AOU in 1956; he immediately resigned and was succeeded by Ernst Mayr. Despite having additional strokes, Griscom continued to watch birds and record his observations, making his last journal entry on May 14, 1959. On May 28, he died in Cambridge, Massachusetts. Griscom is buried at Mount Auburn Cemetery.

== Recognition ==
Ludlow Griscom was a fellow of the American Association for the Advancement of Science. He received the Conservation Medal from the National Audubon Society in 1956, and in that same year he was named an honorary president of the organization. Mass Audubon named the research station at its Wellfleet Bay Wildlife Sanctuary for him. At Parker River National Wildlife Refuge, the "Dean of the Birdwatchers" is remembered by a bronze plaque mounted on a five-ton granite boulder near Hellcat Swamp.

In 1980, the American Birding Association established the Ludlow Griscom Award in his honor. Originally designated to recognize "outstanding contributions to excellence in field birding," it now bears the title Outstanding Contributions to Regional Ornithology and is "given to individuals who have dramatically advanced the state of ornithological knowledge for a particular region."

== Quotes ==
- "One need not shoot a bird to know what it was."

== Selected publications ==
- Nichols, John T.; Griscom, Ludlow (1917). "Fresh-water Fishes of the Congo Basin Obtained by the American Museum Congo Exhibition, 1909–1915". Bulletin of the American Museum of Natural History. 37: 653–756.
- Griscom, Ludlow (1922). "Problems of Field Identification". The Auk. 39: 31–41.
- Griscom, Ludlow (1922). "Field Studies of the Anatidae of the Atlantic Coast, Part I". The Auk. 39: 517–530.
- Griscom, Ludlow (1923). Birds of the New York City Region. Handbook series no. 9. New York, N.Y.: American Museum of Natural History. 400 pp.
- Griscom, Ludlow (1923). "Field Studies of the Anatidae of the Atlantic Coast, Part II". The Auk. 40: 69–80.
- Griscom, Ludlow (1932). "The Distribution of Bird-life in Guatemala". Bulletin of the American Museum of Natural History. 64: 1–439.
- Griscom, Ludlow (1933). "The Birds of Dutchess County, New York from Records Compiled by Maunsell S. Crosby" (PDF). Transactions of the Linnaean Society of New York. 3: 1–184.
- Griscom, Ludlow (1934). "The Ornithology of Guerrero, Mexico". Bulletin of the Museum of Comparative Zoology. 75: 367–422.
- Fernald, Merritt L.; Griscom, Ludlow (1935). "Three Days of Botanizing in Southeastern Virginia". Contributions from the Gray Herbarium of Harvard University. 107: 129–157, 167–189.
- Griscom, Ludlow (1935). "The Ornithology of the Republic of Panama". Bulletin of the Museum of Comparative Zoology. 78: 261–382.
- Griscom, Ludlow (1936). "Modern Problems of Field Identification". Bird-Lore. 38: 12–18.
- Fernald, Merritt L.; Griscom, Ludlow (1937). "Notes on Diodia". Rhodora. 39: 306–308.
- Griscom, Ludlow (1937). "A Monographic Study of the Red Crossbill". Proceedings of the Boston Society of Natural History. 11: 77–210.
- Griscom, Ludlow; Greenway, J. C. Jr. (1941). "Birds of Lower Amazonia". Bulletin of the Museum of Comparative Zoology. 88: 81–344.
- Griscom, Ludlow (1945). Modern Bird Study. Cambridge, Massachusetts: Harvard University Press. 190 pp.
- Griscom, Ludlow (1946). "Fifty Years of Conservation". Bulletin of the Massachusetts Audubon Society. 30: 65–72.
- Griscom, Ludlow (1948). "Duck Shooting Can Be Saved". Field and Stream. 52 (9): 22–23, 83–85.
- Griscom, Ludlow; Folger, Edith V. (1948). The Birds of Nantucket. New England Bird Studies I. Cambridge, Massachusetts: Harvard University Press. 156 pp.
- Griscom, Ludlow (1949). The Birds of Concord: A Study in Population Trends. New England Bird Studies II. Cambridge, Massachusetts: Harvard University Press. 340 pp.
- Griscom, Ludlow (1950). "Distribution and Origin of the Birds of Mexico". Bulletin of the Museum of Comparative Zoology. 103: 341–382.
- Griscom, Ludlow (1950). Audubon's Birds of America, Popular Edition. New York, N.Y.: Macmillan. ISBN 978-1-135-15875-0. 320 pp. Introduction and text for 288 plates.
- Friedman, Herbert; Griscom, Ludlow; Moore, Robert T. (1950). Distributional Check-list of the Birds of Mexico, Part I. Pacific Coast Avifauna 29. Berkeley, Calif.: Cooper Ornithological Club. 202 pp.
- Griscom, Ludlow; Snyder, Dorothy Eastman (1955). The Birds of Massachusetts: An Annotated and Revised Check List. Salem, Mass.: Peabody Museum. 295 pp.
- Griscom, Ludlow; Sprunt, Alexander Jr., eds. (1957). The Warblers of America: A Popular Account of the Wood Warblers as They Occur in the Western Hemisphere. New York, N.Y.: Devin-Adair. 356 pp.
- Miller, A. H.; Friedman, Herbert; Griscom, Ludlow; Moore, Robert T. (1957). Distributional Check-list of the Birds of Mexico, Part II. Pacific Coast Avifauna 33. Berkeley, Calif.: Cooper Ornithological Club. 436 pp.
- Griscom, Ludlow; Emerson, Guy (1959). Birds of Martha's Vineyard, with an Annotated Check List. Martha's Vineyard, Mass. 164 pp. Privately printed.
