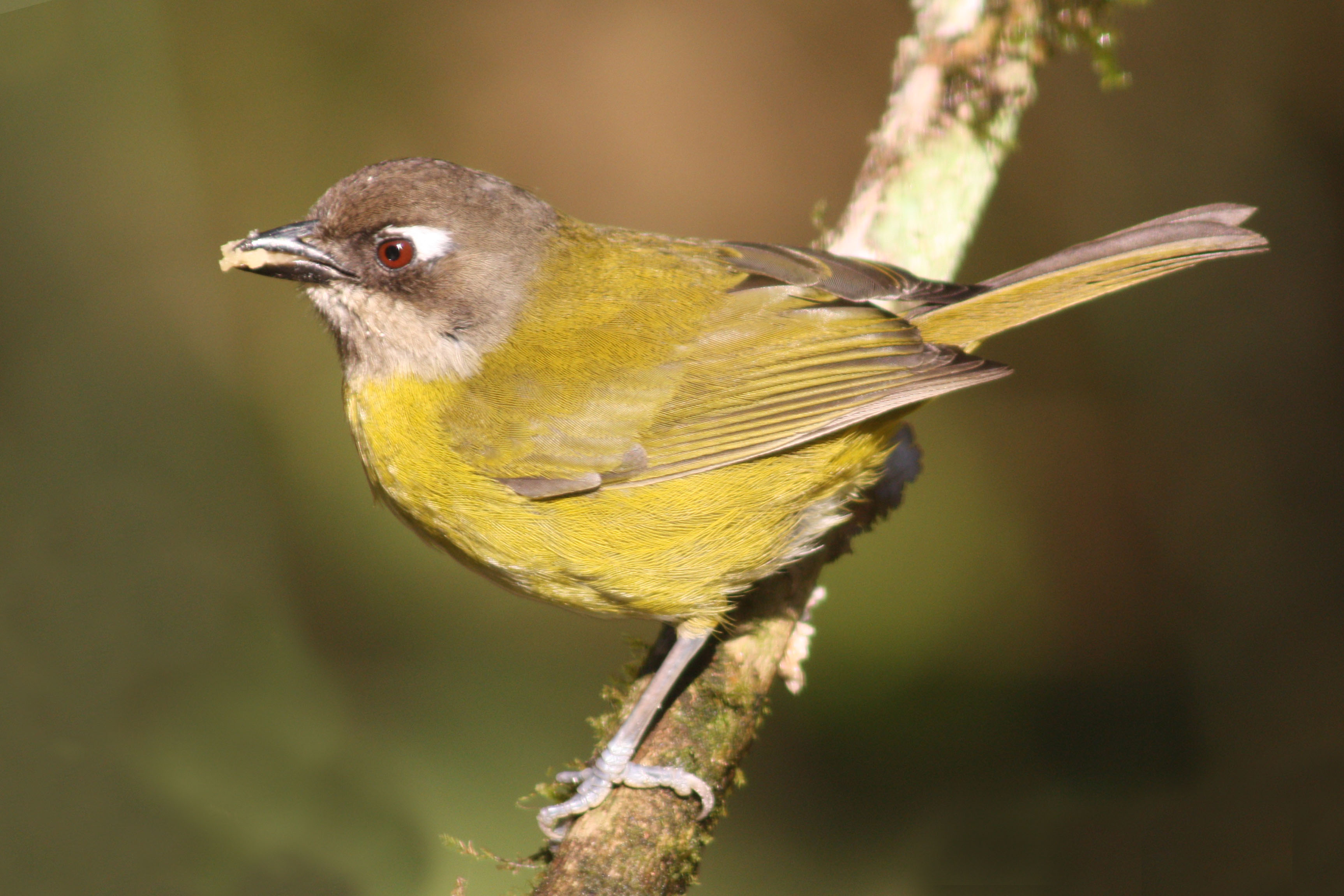
- Chlorospingus flavopectus regionalis, Costa Rica
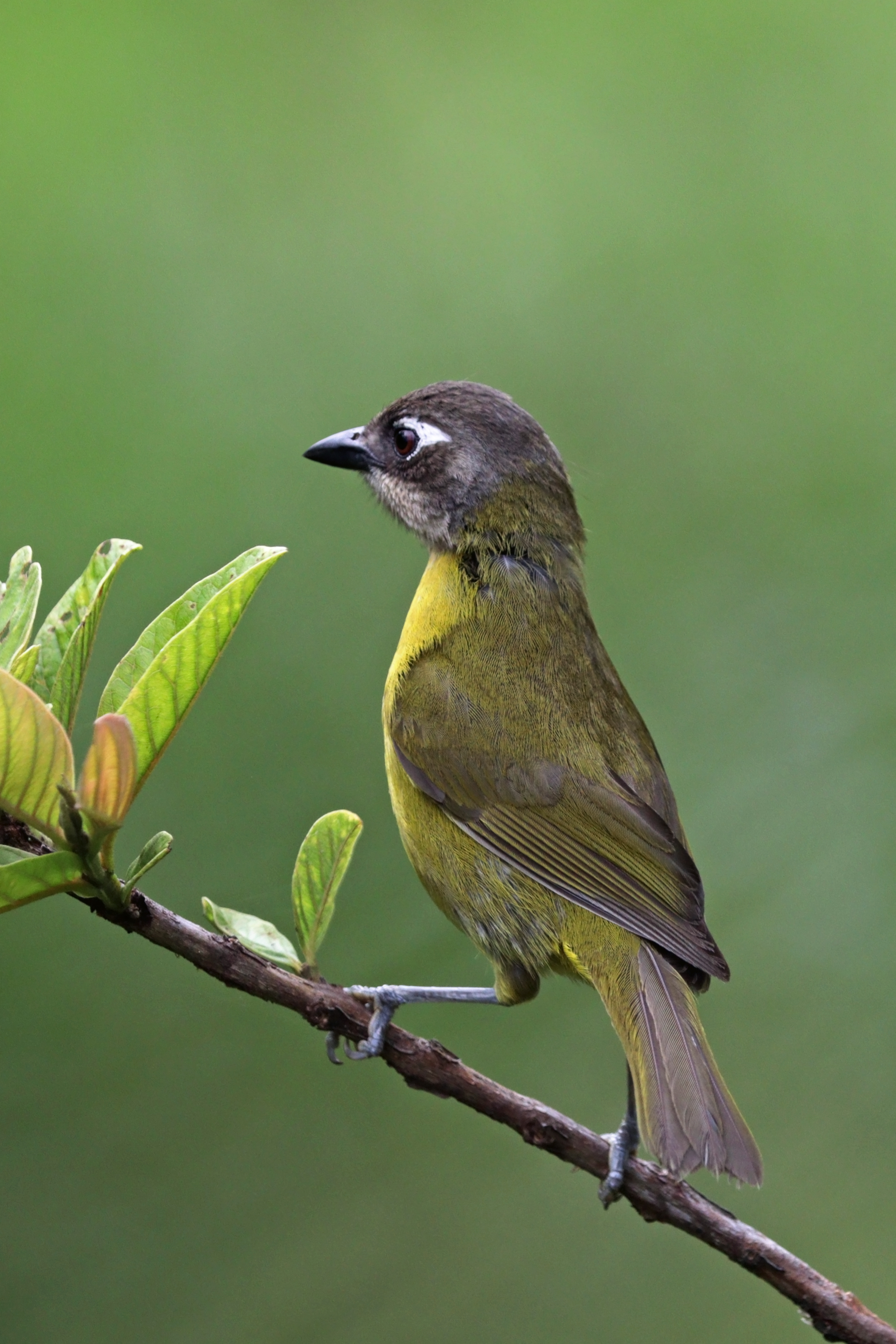
- Chlorospingus flavopectus punctulatus, Panama

Conservation status
- Least Concern (IUCN 3.1)

Scientific classification
- Kingdom: Animalia
- Phylum: Chordata
- Class: Aves
- Order: Passeriformes
- Family: Passerellidae
- Genus: Chlorospingus
- Species: C. flavopectus

Binomial name
- Chlorospingus flavopectus (Lafresnaye, 1840)

Synonyms
- Chlorospingus ophthalmicus (but see text)

= Common chlorospingus =

Species of bird

The common chlorospingus (Chlorospingus flavopectus), also referred to as common bush tanager, is a small passerine bird. It is a resident breeder in the highlands from central Mexico south to Bolivia and northwest Argentina. C. flavopectus in the loose sense is a notorious cryptic species complex, and several of the up to 25 subspecies recognized in recent times are likely to be distinct species. Some populations in fact appear to be more distinct than several other members of Chlorospingus.

== Description and ecology ==
The adult is 13.5 cm (5.3 in) long and weighs 20 g (0.71 oz) on average. They have a brown head with a (usually) thin supercilium and a white spot behind the eye and a light throat. The upperparts are olive and the underparts yellow, becoming white on the belly. Coloration, especially of the cheeks, throat and eye region, is very variable across the wide range, giving weight to the theory that these birds form a superspecies. Immatures are browner above, darker below, and have a duller olive eye spot. Hatchlings are covered in dark gray down feathers and have bright yellow bills.

The call is a squeaky tseeet or chit. Songs vary widely between the populations.

The related sooty-capped chlorospingus (C. pileatus) has a blacker head with a bold white supercilium rather than an eye spot.

This bird is typically found from 400 to 2,300 m (1,300 to 7,500 ft) ASL in Middle America; near the Equator they are common found at altitudes of 2,000–3,500 m (6,600–11,500 ft) ASL. Its habitat – cloud forests with ample undergrowth and adjacent bushy clearings – is dominated by trees and shrubs from such families as Asteraceae, Clusiaceae, Cyatheaceae, Melastomataceae, Rubiaceae and Winteraceae, and epiphytes of the Araceae (e.g. Anthurium) and Orchidaceae.

The common chlorospingus is usually encountered in small groups or as part of a mixed-species feeding flock, and is rather sedentary. This passerine feeds on insects, spiders small fruits and nectar.

The menoponid chewing louse Myrsidea ophthalmici was described from a Venezuelan specimen of this bird; it is not known from other hosts to date. The Venezuelan population of the common chlorospingus would, if this taxon is split up, be assigned to a distinct species.

There is apparently no dedicated nesting season at least in the hottest parts of its range, but in general it seems that the common chlorospingus prefers to breed mainly between October and May. These birds hide their nest below vegetation on a bank or slope, in a hollow or tree trunk, amongst epiphytes, or up in a tree. The bulky cup nest, made from thin twigs and roots, coarse leaves and mosses, is some 10–15 cm (3.9–5.9 in) high and nearly 10 cm (3.9 in) wide. The nest cup, lined with fine leaves and fibers, is almost 5 cm (2.0 in) wide and deep. The nest may be placed over 20 m (66 ft) up in a tree, but usually is located 15 m (49 ft) high or less; in most populations nests are occasionally built less than 1 m (3.3 ft) above and sometimes even right on the ground.

The normal clutch is two eggs in most of the range. The northernmost populations, however, sometimes produce clutches of three eggs, while in the southern Andean group one-egg clutches might be frequent or even the norm. This species is regularly double-brooded at least in part of its range. The eggs are off-white and marked with larger puce and smaller maroon spots mainly on the blunt end. They are about 20 mm (0.79 in) long and weigh about 2.4 g (0.085 oz) on average, though eggs in one-egg clutches of Andean birds may measure almost 24 mm (0.94 in) in length and normally weigh around 3 g (0.11 oz), but occasionally more than 3.5 g (0.12 oz) . The female incubates for much of the day, while both parents provide the young with food. As the nestlings near fledging, they are fed every 15 minutes or so on average.

== Systematics and taxonomy ==
Traditionally, the genus Chlorospingus was placed with the tanager family, Thraupidae. More recent research suggests that they are actually aberrant brush finches in the Passerellidae and particularly close to Arremonops. Hence, as a common name "chlorospinguses" would arguably better than that the widely used "bush tanagers", as the former is equally well suited to either placement.

The wide range and considerable morphological variation displayed by C. ophthalmicus has been a problem for ornithologists for many decades. Initially, many taxa presently united in this species were considered distinct, but they were eventually all lumped together. More recent results suggest that the common chlorospingus is actually a superspecies.

A preliminary study of allozyme data found pronounced divergences between the northern populations. mtDNA ATPase 8 sequence data found five major clades in the Mexican populations alone. These were subsequently confirmed by morphological comparisons. A formal splitting-up of this species into several seems to be the eventual outcome, pending data from the populations south of Mexico. In addition, it would be interesting to determine whether there are geographical variations in the song that would further strengthen the case for species status of the taxa. The morphological variation, though recognizable, is rather inconspicuous and probably more the consequence of genetic drift in freshly isolated subpopulations than a cause for their separation.

=== Northern group ===
These populations are characterized by a crown which is more brownish than gray, and in some even a pure hue of more or less reddish brown. The head markings are usually conspicuous and contrasting. Their song is a high thin whichis whichis witchery tsee tseep seeur with many variations.

It appears as if the group north of the Isthmus of Panama originated before the final bout of the Great American Interchange, by island-hopping across the emerging mountain ranges that now make up the isthmus, some 6 million years ago (mya). The direct descendants of the original colonizers of Mesoamerica are the southernmost Mesoamerican group, as is to be expected. Some 5.5 mya, the Sierra de los Tuxtlas population originated. The other groups west of the Isthmus of Tehuantepec radiated rather synchronously between 3 and 4 mya.

Notably, the divergence between the northern clades seems to have occurred far too early for the Pleistocene ice ages to have played a major part. Rather, it appears that the common chlorospingus evolved in and was always confined to montane cloud forest. Given its sedentary habits, the phylogeny seems to be a result of a combination of habitat expanding and constricting due to Pliocene climate changes and, less frequently, accidental dispersal (such as to the Sierra de los Tuxtlas and, earlier, to Mesoamerica in general).

The five northern clades are:

- Brown-headed chlorospingus, Chlorospingus (ophthalmicus) ophthalmicus – (Du Bus de Gisignies, 1847):

Found in the Sierra Madre Oriental, from south-east San Luis Potosí south to northern Oaxaca. May contain several subspecies. The status of birds from around Montserrate (westernmost Chiapas) is unknown, but these are probably dwighti.
Crown olive. Throat whitish-gray, speckled and with indistinct "whiskers". Breast-band yellow to chartreuse yellow. Ear region dark. Eyestreak thin. Thin, incomplete white spectacles. Forehead spots indistinct.

- Dusky-headed chlorospingus, Chlorospingus (ophthalmicus) postocularis – Cabanis, 1866:

Found in the extreme southeast Sierra Madre de Chiapas (Volcán Tacaná; probably west to El Triunfo) and southwards along the Pacific slope of the Central American mountains, probably to Nicaragua. If considered a separate species, includes subspecies honduratius and schistaceiceps.
Crown sepia. Throat almost white, speckled, no "whiskers". Breast-band yellow. Ear region whitish. Eyestreak thin, broader behind eye but no spectacles. Forehead unspotted.

- White-fronted chlorospingus, Chlorospingus (ophthalmicus) albifrons – Salvin & Godman, 1889:

Found in the Sierra Madre del Sur mountains in Guerrero and Oaxaca. May contain several subspecies such as persimilis of the Sierra de Miahuatlán.
Crown cinnamon. Throat light buff with conspicuous "whiskers" and speckled sides. Breast-band tangerine yellow. Ear region dark. Eyestreak thin, merging into incomplete white spectacles and hence shaped like a horizontal teardrop. Forehead with round white spots.

- Dwight's chlorospingus, Chlorospingus (ophthalmicus) dwighti – Underdown, 1931:

Found in the mountains of north Chiapas and easternmost Oaxaca, west to the Atlantic slope of Guatemala and probably the western Sierra Madre de Chiapas.
Crown olive. Throat almost white, speckled and with indistinct "whiskers". Breast-band chartreuse yellow shading to olive green. Ear region dark. Eyestreak thick. Conspicuous incomplete white spectacles. Forehead spots indistinct.

- Wetmore's chlorospingus, Chlorospingus (ophthalmicus) wetmorei – Lowery & Newman, 1949:

Found in the Sierra de los Tuxtlas, Veracruz
Crown olive. Throat whitish-gray, speckled and with indistinct "whiskers". Breast-band yellow to chartreuse yellow. Ear region dark. Eyestreak thin. Thin but distinct incomplete white spectacles. White forehead spots V-shaped.

Chlorospingus ophthalmicus regionalis is found in Costa Rica. Its relationship to the postocularis group and the Panamanian C. o. novicius warrants thorough study, as these three taxa appear to be rather intermediate between the main northern and the South American groups, with whitish ears but a fairly brownish crown.

=== Southern group ===
Meanwhile, ecological data shows some interesting differences between southern populations too. Several subspecies appear to be well distinct, and there is much evidence suggesting they are distinct species. These birds are generally duskier and more indistinctly marked on the head than the northern populations.

In the north of the Cordillera Oriental of Colombia, extending into the Cordillera de Mérida and Serranía del Perijá of Venezuela, a group of subspecies occurs that resembles the northerly birds; subspecies such as C. o. venezuelensis are included here. They might be most closely related to those around the Isthmus of Panama, or constitute a group distinct from the Central American forms. An undetermined and possibly new subspecies is found in Lara state in Venezuela, for example in Yacambú National Park. C. o. jacqueti occurs in Norte de Santander and possibly Boyacá and Santander departments in Colombia; it seems to be the most southerly representative of this group. These birds have a grayish-brown crown, a buffy-white speckled throat, and – like the birds further north – a white ear region. Their dawn song consists of a monotonous series of chit or chup notes.

Between Norte de Santander and the border region of Antioquia, Boyacá, Cundinamarca and Santander departments, a complex situation exists, with C. o. eminens, C. o. exitelus and C. o. trudis being of unclear assignment as to subspecies group. If there is little intergradation in this region, the case for the southern Andean populations being a distinct species is rather robust. In fact, they have time and again been treated as a good species C. flavopectus.

The flavopectus group contains larger birds which lack a pronounced brown tinge on the crown; many members have this area purely gray to blackish. The white throat is almost devoid of spotting, and there is no white ear spot. This group includes taxa such as C. o. flavopectus and C. o. nigriceps from central to southern Colombia, C. o. phaeocephalus from Ecuador, C. o. peruvianus from Peru, or C. o. cinereocephalus and C. o. hiaticolus. Their dawn song consists of a series of chit notes, accelerating to higher-pitched chit-its and often accelerating further but descending in pitch again to fade out in a churring trill trrrrrrrr.... Some, like C. o. phaeocephalus and C. o. nigriceps, have an even more complex dawn song, in which the middle part is replaced by a first trill at constant volume, breaking up into a few shorter trills trrrrrrrr tr tr tr... before ending with the fading lower trill. These populations also tend to give long series of chit calls between their songs.

In the far south of the species' range, C. o. argentatus is found in the Yungas of northwestern Argentina. It is not known exactly how these birds relate to the taxa higher up in the Andes; they are generally little-studied. They have a tendency to build their nests uncharacteristically high up in trees; for this reason, it is unknown whether one-egg clutches are as commonly seen in this population as they seem to occur in the flavopectus group. It does not seem to like nesting less than 10 m (33 ft) above the ground, but considering the high rate of failed nesting attempts (more than 35% abandoned nests in one study in El Rey National Park), avoiding predators or other reasons for brood failure does not seem to be a very good explanation for this behavior.
