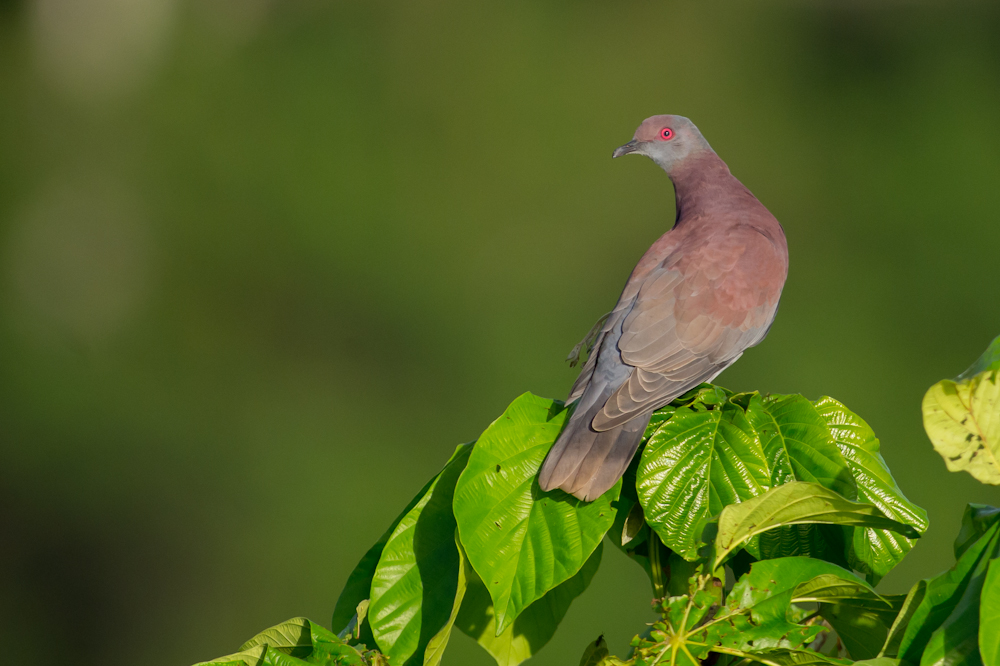

Conservation status
- Least Concern (IUCN 3.1)

Scientific classification
- Kingdom: Animalia
- Phylum: Chordata
- Class: Aves
- Order: Columbiformes
- Family: Columbidae
- Genus: Patagioenas
- Species: P. cayennensis

Binomial name
- Patagioenas cayennensis (Bonnaterre, 1792)

Synonyms
- Columba cayennensis Bonnaterre, 1792

= Pale-vented pigeon =

Species of bird

The pale-vented pigeon (Patagioenas cayennensis) is a large pigeon (family Columbidae) found in the tropical Americas. Formerly often placed in Columba, it actually belongs to a clade of the older New World genus Patagioenas. With its relatives it represents an evolutionary radiation extending through most of the warm-temperate to tropical Americas. Grey-hued birds, even their males generally lack iridescent display plumage, although the present species has some coppery gloss on the nape.

It is a resident breeder from southern Mexico south to Bolivia and northern Argentina and on Tobago and Trinidad, although it is very localised on the latter island. Vagrants are occasionally seen in adjacent regions; for example, the species is noted to stray into Uruguay from Argentina and occasionally from Brazil, but it has never been noted to breed or even maintain a permanent presence in the former country.

== Description ==
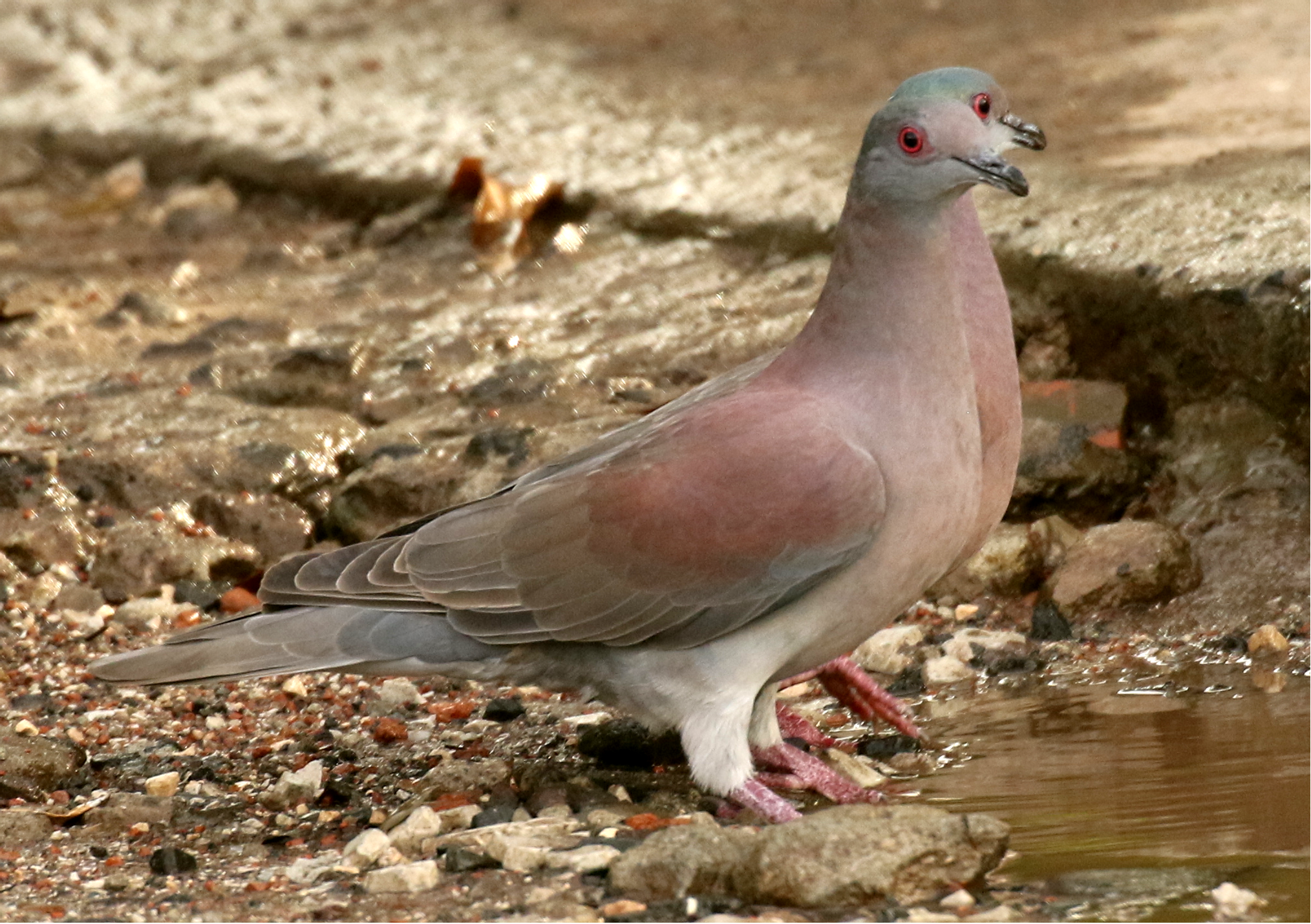
Panama City

The pale-vented pigeon is 30–32 cm long and weighs normally 230–250 g. Adult males have a mainly dull purple head, breast and upperpart plumage, with copper glossing on the nape and a whitish throat. The lower back and tail are dark grey and the lower underparts are pale grey. The bill is black and the legs, iris and eyering are red. The female is similar, but duller than the male, and immatures are greyish-brown, very dull, and mainly greyish brown.

The southern subspecies P. c. andersoni has white lower underparts, rather than the pale grey of nominate P. c. cayennensis.

The call is a row of soft kuk kuk croo-ooos; the initial short kuk is characteristic for the "cayennensis group" of Patagioenas. Altogether, this species' song is intermediate between that of its close relatives the plain (P. inornata) and red-billed pigeons (P. flavirostris).

It may in the field resemble a scaled pigeon (P. speciosa), which has a similar display flight. These two large species are also the only pigeons in their range which are often seen flying in the open away from forests. But of course P. cayennensis lacks the scaly appearance, and the calls and appearance from close by indicate that the two are not particularly close relatives among their congeners.

== Ecology ==
The pale-vented pigeon is common at forest edges, riverbanks, and other partially open areas with some trees. It feeds mainly on small fruits, berries and seed. This is a fairly solitary bird, but may form small flocks at drinking areas. Its flight is high, fast and direct, with the regular beats and an occasional sharp flick of the wings which are characteristic of pigeons in general.

It also has a breeding display with a semi-circular glide down to its original perch. It builds a small twig nest in a small tree, and normally lays one white egg.

Widespread and common, it is classified a species of least concern by the IUCN.
