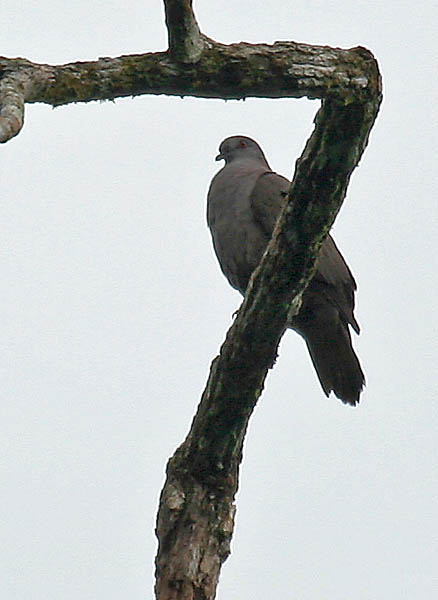

Conservation status
- Least Concern (IUCN 3.1)

Scientific classification
- Kingdom: Animalia
- Phylum: Chordata
- Class: Aves
- Order: Columbiformes
- Family: Columbidae
- Genus: Patagioenas
- Species: P. goodsoni

Binomial name
- Patagioenas goodsoni (Hartert, 1902)

Synonyms
- Columba goodsoni Hartert, 1902

= Dusky pigeon =

Species of bird

The dusky pigeon (Patagioenas goodsoni) is a species of bird in the family Columbidae. It is found in Colombia and Ecuador.

== Taxonomy and systematics ==
The dusky pigeon is most closely related to the ruddy pigeon (P. subvinacea), short-billed pigeon (P. nigrirostris), and plumbeous pigeon (P. plumbia), and they have sometimes been placed in subgenus Oenoenas. The dusky pigeon is monotypic.

== Description ==
The dusky pigeon is about 24 cm (9.4 in) long. Its head, throat, and breast are gray or purplish gray. Its nape is gray glossed with purple. Its shoulders, back, and rump are olive brown or dark purplish brown. The wings and tail are bronzy gray, sometimes glossed with purple. Its eye can be any of several shades of red.

== Distribution and habitat ==
The dusky pigeon is found in the Chocó Biogeographic Region from Colombia near the Panamanian border south to the Río Palenque in northwestern Ecuador. It inhabits rainforest, mostly in lowlands but as high as 1,500 m (4,900 ft) in elevation.

== Behavior ==
=== Feeding ===
No information on the dusky pigeon's foraging behavior or diet has been published.

=== Breeding ===
Specimens of dusky pigeon in breeding condition were taken between January and May and also in August, but no further information about the species' breeding phenology has been published.

=== Vocalization ===
The dusky pigeon's song is "a repeated phrase of three rather high-pitched coos whoah..pup..pup. Its call is "a purring, drawn out rrrrow.

== Status ==
The IUCN has assessed the dusky pigeon as being of Least Concern. Though it has a restricted range, it is common locally within it. However, its life history is almost unknown, and "deforestation may prove to be a serious threat."
