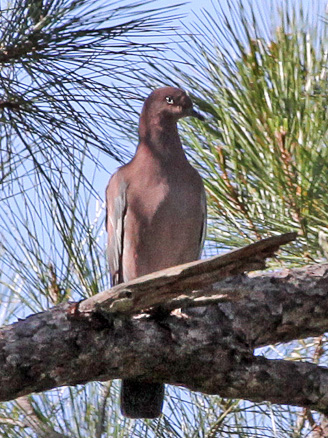
- Plain pigeon in the Sierra de Bahoruco National Park, Dominican Republic

Conservation status
- Near Threatened (IUCN 3.1)

Scientific classification
- Kingdom: Animalia
- Phylum: Chordata
- Class: Aves
- Order: Columbiformes
- Family: Columbidae
- Genus: Patagioenas
- Species: P. inornata

Binomial name
- Patagioenas inornata (Vigors, 1827)

Synonyms
- Columba inornata Vigors, 1827

= Plain pigeon =

Species of bird

The plain pigeon (Patagioenas inornata) is a species of bird in the family Columbidae. It is found in the four Greater Antilles, on Cuba, Hispaniola (in the Dominican Republic and Haiti), Jamaica, and Puerto Rico. Its natural habitats are forest, woodland, coastal scrub, mangrove and swampy areas. It is threatened by habitat loss and illegal hunting.

== Description ==
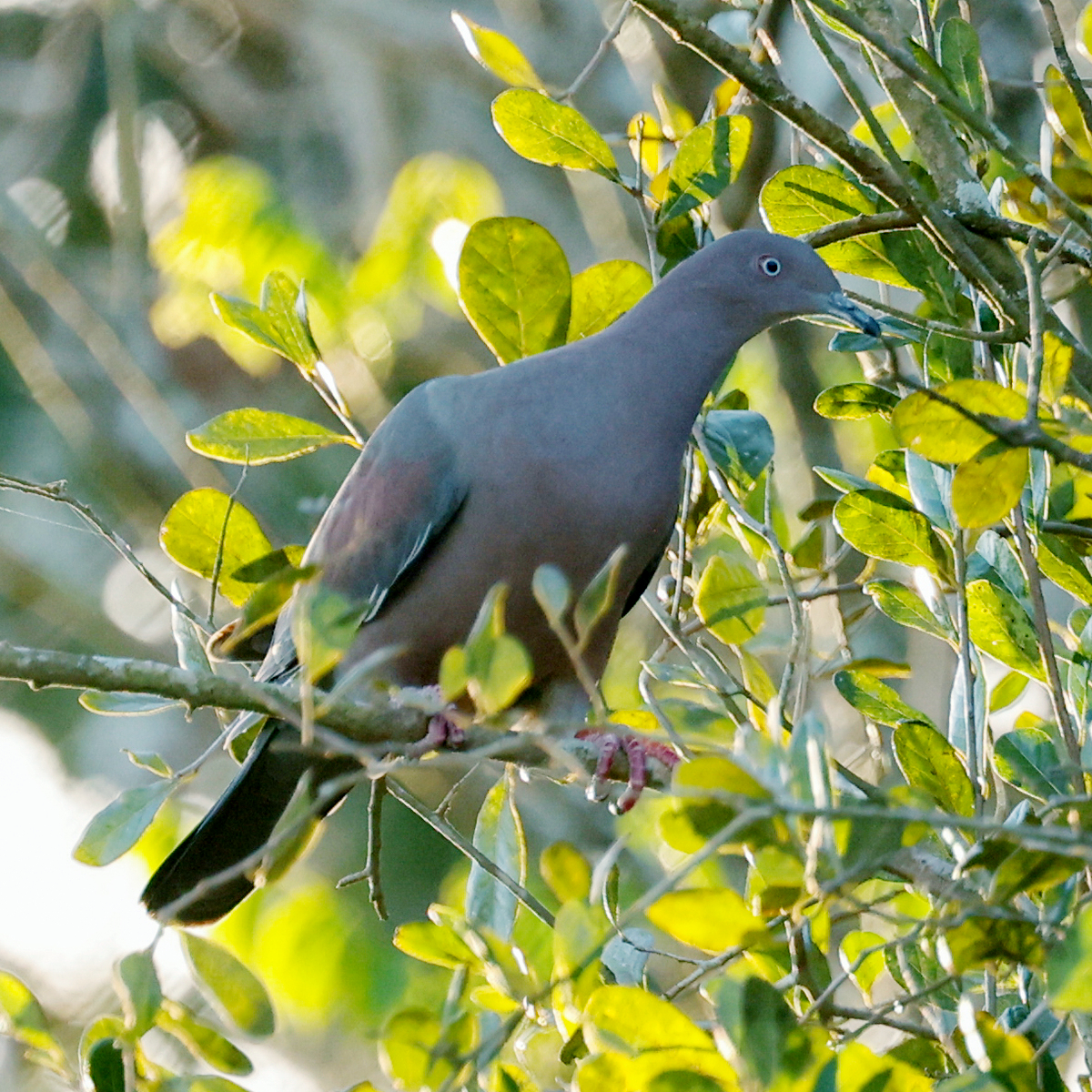
Plain pigeon at Camagüey, Cuba

The plain pigeon is a large-bodied bird 38–41 cm (15–16 in) long that superficially resembles a large feral pigeon or a very plainly-plumaged band-tailed pigeon. At a distance it appears pale blue-gray overall. The head, hindneck, breast, and part of the folded wing are colored with a red-wine wash. When folded, the wing shows a white leading edge; in flight, it forms a conspicuous wing bar. The eyes have a pale yellow iris; the legs and feet are dark red, and the bill black. The female is slightly smaller and duller than the male. Juveniles are browner overall, with pale wing margins and dark eyes. On Jamaica, it can be confused with the Jamaican endemic ring-tailed pigeon P. caribaea, but that has a red eye, a gray wing lacking the wine-colored wash of plain pigeon, and a paler tail with an obvious dark blackish-gray band across the base of the tail.

== Taxonomy ==
The plain pigeon is thought to represent a superspecies with the red-billed pigeon (P. flavirostria) and the Maranon pigeon (P. oenops), found in Central and South America respectively; these two are however both smaller than plain pigeon at 32–37 cm (13–15 in).

Three subspecies of the plain pigeon have been described and were formerly often accepted, with P. i. inornata from Cuba and Hispaniola, P. i. exigua from Jamaica, and P. i. wetmorei from Puerto Rico. However, there is no discernible difference between these, and the species is now treated as monotypic.

== Status ==
During the 1970s, the Puerto Rican population was on the brink of extinction. The ornithologist Richard C. Banks suggested it possibly did become extinct there, as there were no sightings on Puerto Rico between 1926 and 1958, with the current population a natural or human-assisted recolonization from Hispaniola; as with other species in the genus, it is capable of strong flight and could cross between the islands readily. A conservation program was introduced to save the species and now it numbers a few thousand individuals.
