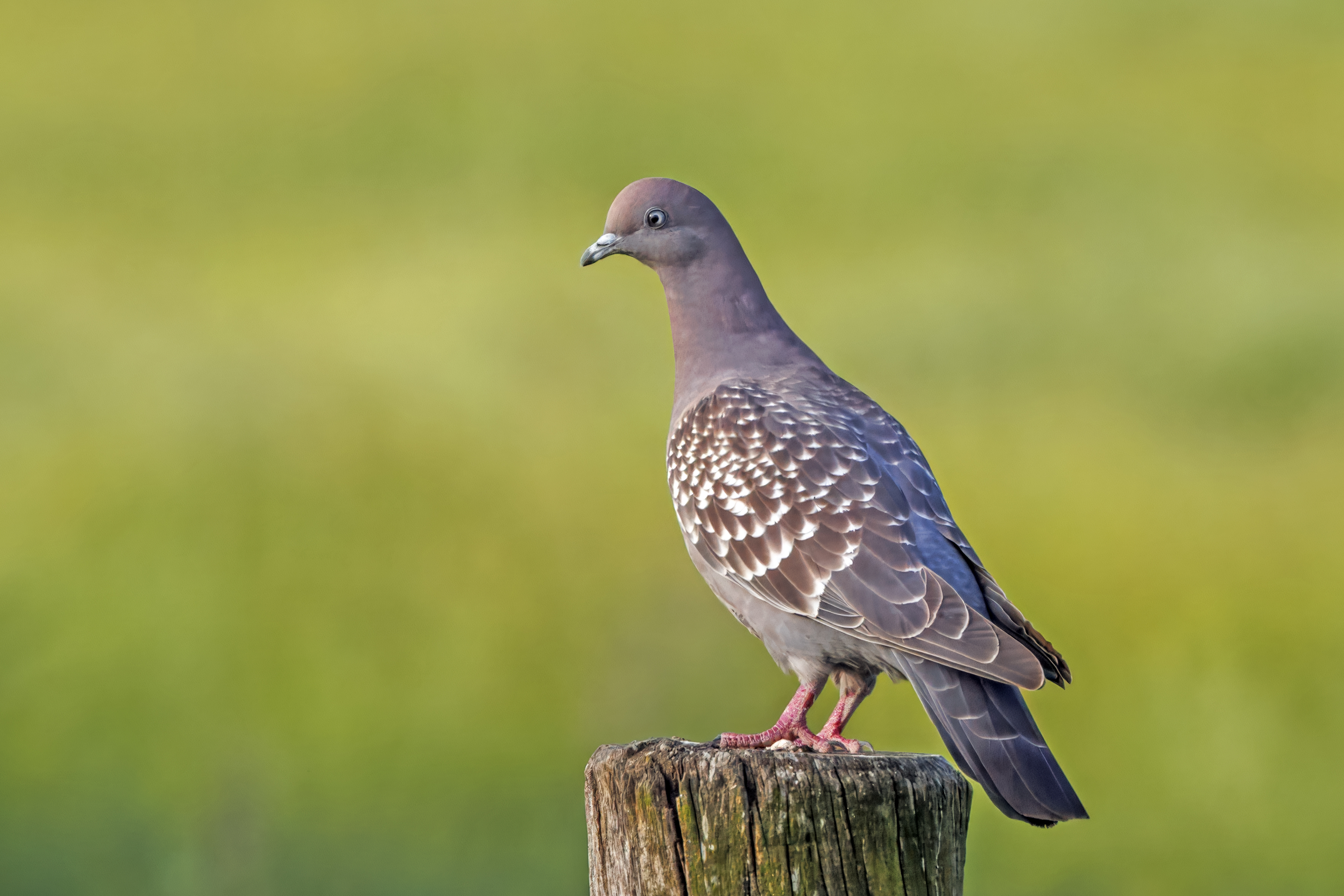

Conservation status
- Least Concern (IUCN 3.1)

Scientific classification
- Kingdom: Animalia
- Phylum: Chordata
- Class: Aves
- Order: Columbiformes
- Family: Columbidae
- Genus: Patagioenas
- Species: P. maculosa

Binomial name
- Patagioenas maculosa (Temminck, 1813)

Synonyms
- Columba maculosa Temminck, 1813

= Spot-winged pigeon =

Species of bird

The spot-winged pigeon (Patagioenas maculosa) is a species of bird in the family Columbidae. It is found in Argentina, Bolivia, Brazil, Chile, Paraguay, Peru, and Uruguay.

== Taxonomy and systematics ==
At least one author has asserted, based on plumage similarities, that the spot-winged pigeon, picazuro pigeon (P. picazuro), bare-eyed pigeon (P. corensis), and scaled pigeon (P. speciosa) form a monophyletic group. Others argue that significant vocal differences belie that.

According to the International Ornithological Committee (IOC), the Clements taxonomy, and the South American Classification Committee of the American Ornithological Society, the spot-winged pigeon has two subspecies, the nominate P. m. maculosa and P. m. albipennis, . The Handbook of the Birds of the World treats the latter as a separate species, white-winged pigeon.

== Description ==
The two subspecies of spot-winged pigeon differ significantly in their plumage. The nominate P. m. maculosa is 32 to 33 cm (13 to 13 in) long and weighs 308 to 347 g (10.9 to 12.2 oz). The adult male's forehead, crown, nape, hindneck, and breast are mostly dull purplish pink and the rest of the head and underparts are gray. The upper back and wing coverts are dark brown and show creamy white spots. The wings are mostly black above and pale gray below. The lower back and rump are bluish gray and the tail dark gray. The adult female is similar but the head and neck are generally duller. The juvenile is also similar, but duller all over with drab gray head and breast.

P. m. albipennis is slightly larger, 33 to 34 cm (13 to 13 in) long. The adults' head, neck, rump, and the whole of the underparts are blue-gray with a purplish wash that is especially pronounced in the male. The upper back and wing coverts are gray-brown. The folded wing shows a conspicuous white band that contrasts with the otherwise dark wing. As in the nominate subspecies, the juvenile is a duller version of the adult.

== Distribution and habitat ==
P. m. maculosa is found in southeastern Bolivia south and east through Paraguay, southern Brazil, and Uruguay to south-central Argentina. It inhabits arid to semi-arid open woodland and scrub up to 1,000 m (3,300 ft) in elevation. It shuns towns. P. m. albipennis is found from central Peru south to western and central Bolivia, extreme northwestern Argentina, and far northern Chile. It also inhabits arid to semi-arid open woodland and scrub, but at elevations generally between 2,000 and 4,300 m (6,600 and 14,100 ft). It is locally common in towns.

== Behavior ==
=== Feeding ===
Both subspecies of spot-winged pigeon typically feed in flocks on the ground. P. m. maculosa's diet is mostly seeds, including rice and sunflower, but it has been observed eating fruit and leaves. P. m. albipennis's diet has not been studied.

=== Breeding ===
P. m. maculosa breeds year round in Argentina and probably does so in Brazil. It builds a fragile nest in trees and lays one or two eggs. P. m. albipennis's breeding phenology has not been studied, but "frequency of calling apparently increases in Oct, suggesting that this might indicate the onset of the breeding season."

=== Vocalization ===
P. m. maculosa's song is "a rhythmic series of very hoarse-sounding coos...'cuuuuu uh-cuh-cuuuh...' repeated two or three times. Its call is "a repeated growling 'grwhoh'". P. m. albipennis's song is "a gruff 'rrrrrow grr-g’RRRR grr-g’RRRR grr-g’RRRR'" and its call a "short 'corw'".

== Status ==
The IUCN treats P. m. maculosa and P. m. albipennis as separate species, and has assessed both at being of Least Concern. P. m. maculosa is common and widespread in the southern part of its range, and its population might be increasing. P. m. albipennis is distributed more locally, but its population might also be growing.
