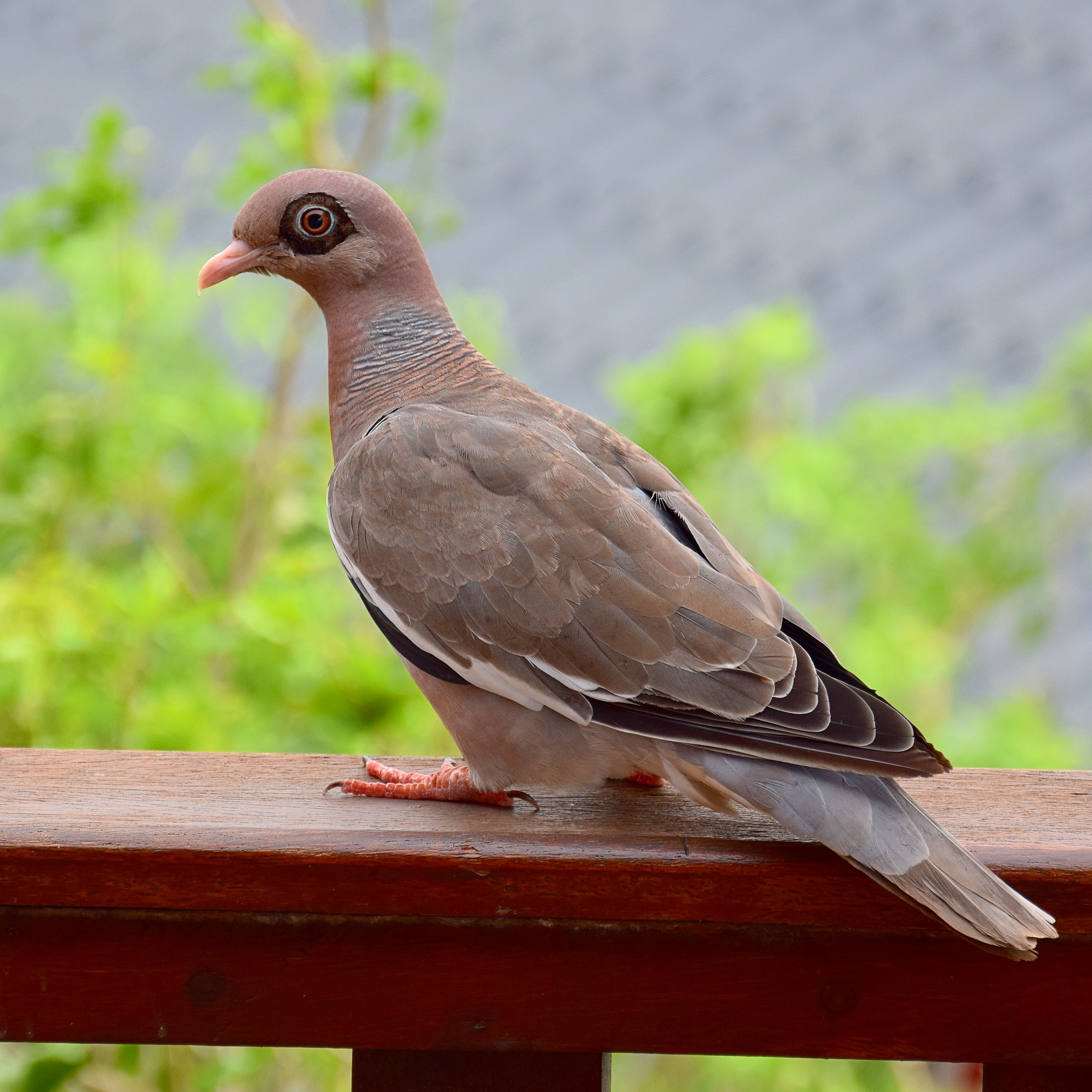

Conservation status
- Least Concern (IUCN 3.1)

Scientific classification
- Kingdom: Animalia
- Phylum: Chordata
- Class: Aves
- Order: Columbiformes
- Family: Columbidae
- Genus: Patagioenas
- Species: P. corensis

Binomial name
- Patagioenas corensis (Jacquin, 1784)

Synonyms
- Columba corensis Jacquin, 1784

= Bare-eyed pigeon =

Species of bird

The bare-eyed pigeon (Patagioenas corensis) is a species of bird in the family Columbidae. It is found in Colombia, Venezuela, and the Netherlands Antilles.

== Taxonomy and systematics ==
At least one author has asserted that based on plumage similarities the bare-eyed pigeon, picazuro pigeon (P. picazuro), spot-winged pigeon (P. maculosa), and scaled pigeon (P. speciosa) form a monophyletic group. Others argue that significant vocal differences belie that.

The bare-eyed pigeon is monophyletic.

== Description ==
Male bare-eyed pigeons are 32 to 37 cm (13 to 15 in) long and females 30 to 34.5 cm (11.8 to 13.6 in). They weigh about 274 g (9.7 oz). Male and female plumage is the same. Their head, neck, and breast are mauve-pink. The orange-brown eye is surrounded by bare skin, a narrow blue ring and a wider outer area of reddish brown. The neck and upper back have a bronze-black and pale brown scaled appearance and the lower back and rump are pale bluish gray. The chin and vent region are white. The closed wing shows a broad white patch. The juvenile is a paler version of the adults.

== Distribution and habitat ==
The bare-eyed pigeon is found on the Caribbean coasts of Colombia and Venezuela and the near-shore islands of Aruba, Curaçao, Bonaire, Margarita, and Blanquilla. It primarily inhabits an arid landscape of thorn scrub, cactus, and acacia and is also found in mangroves and cultivated areas. It can be found as high as 400 m (1,300 ft) above sea level on the mainland but is generally much lower.

The species was also introduced to the island of Saint Martin in the Caribbean at the end of 2012 or the beginning of 2013, where its population has since greatly increased and spread across the entire island.

== Behavior ==
=== Feeding ===
The bare-eyed pigeon does most of its foraging in trees and shrubs but also feeds on the ground. Its diet is seeds and fruits of trees, vines, and cultivated crops.

=== Breeding ===
The bare-eyed pigeon's breeding cycle appears to be triggered by rain. The nest is a fragile platform of twigs in a tree or shrub. It is so thin that the species' single egg can be seen through it from below.

=== Vocalization ===
The bare-eyed pigeon's song is "a rhythmic series of coos...rwhoh...woh-hu-whOAh...woh-hu-whOAh..woh-hu-whOAh...".

== Status ==
The IUCN has assessed the bare-eyed pigeon as being of Least Concern. It is "[h]eavily hunted and therefore shy and timid, but appears to be relatively secure."
