= Washikemba–Fontein–Onima Important Bird Area =

Important Bird Area on Bonaire in the Dutch Caribbean

Coordinates: 12°14′21″N 68°16′50″W

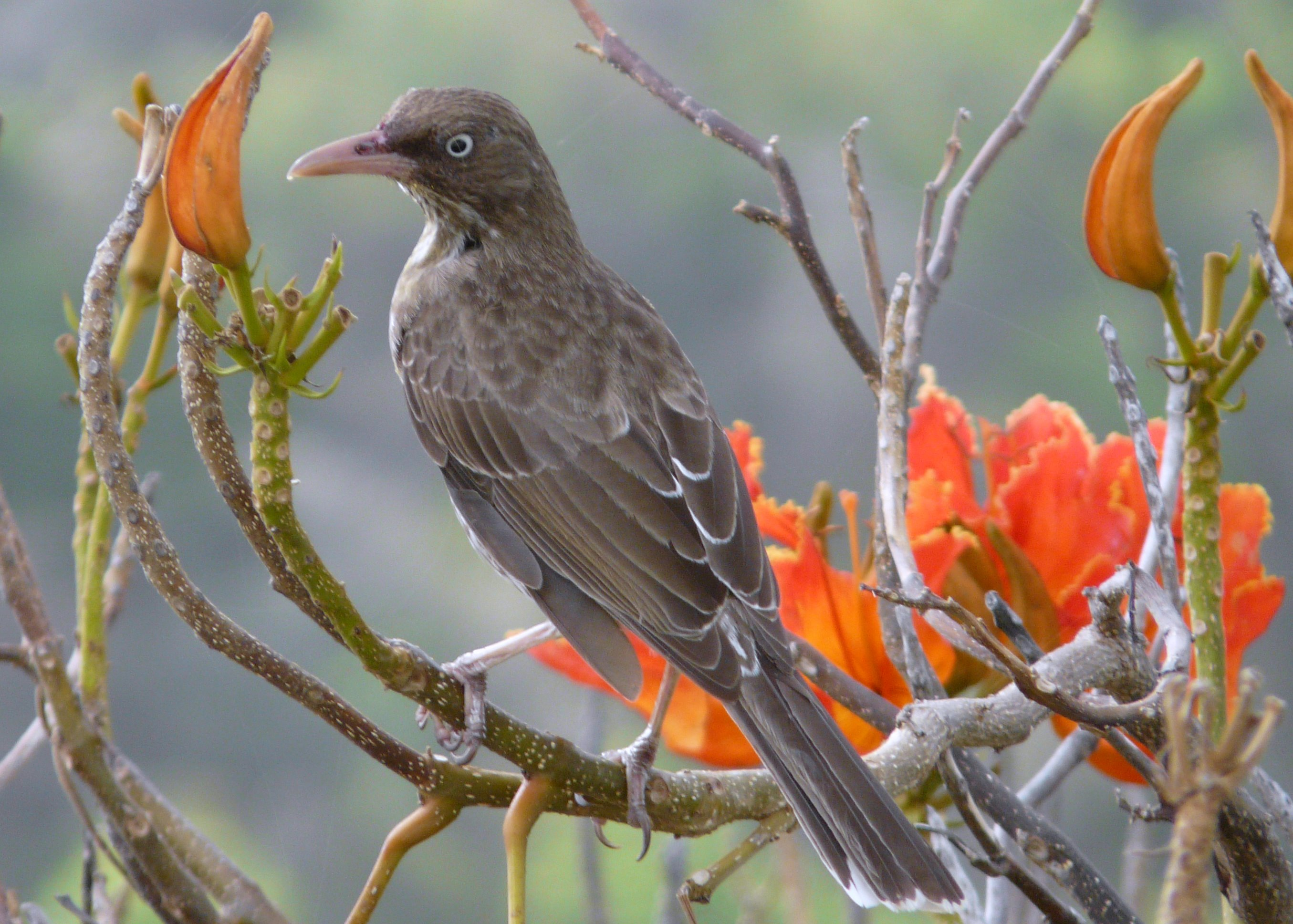
Pearly-eyed thrashers live in the IBA

The Washikemba–Fontein–Onima Important Bird Area is a 5,959 ha strip of land along the north-eastern coast of the island of Bonaire in the Caribbean Netherlands. It has been identified as an Important Bird Area by BirdLife International because it supports populations of various threatened or restricted-range bird species. It contains three freshwater reservoirs as well as arid scrubland and some introduced fruit trees. Birds for which the IBA was identified include bare-eyed pigeons, American coots, least terns, yellow-shouldered amazons, Caribbean elaenias and pearly-eyed thrashers. Potential threats to the site come from illegal trapping of the parrots, habitat destruction by feral donkeys and goats, predation by feral cats, and human disturbance of nesting colonies.
