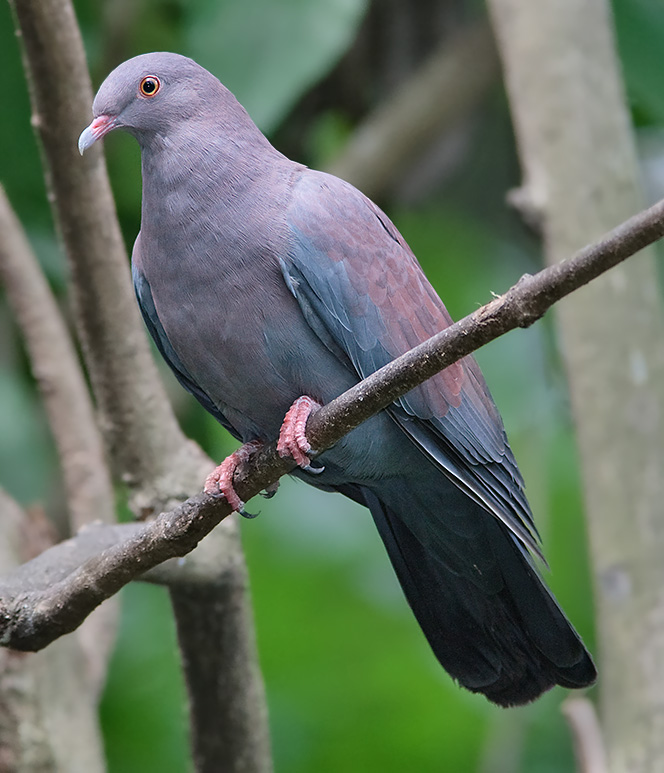

Conservation status
- Near Threatened (IUCN 3.1)

Scientific classification
- Domain: Eukaryota
- Kingdom: Animalia
- Phylum: Chordata
- Class: Aves
- Order: Columbiformes
- Family: Columbidae
- Genus: Patagioenas
- Species: P. oenops

Binomial name
- Patagioenas oenops (Salvin, 1895)

Synonyms
- Columba oenops Salvin, 1895

= Maranon pigeon =

Species of bird

The Maranon pigeon, Peruvian pigeon or Salvin's pigeon (Patagioenas oenops) is a species of bird in the family Columbidae. It is found in Ecuador and Peru.

== Taxonomy and systematics ==
The International Ornithological Committee (IOC) calls this species Maranon pigeon. The South American Classification Committee of the American Ornithological Society (AOS), the Clements taxonomy, and Handbook of the Birds of the World all call it Peruvian pigeon.

The Maranon pigeon is monotypic. It is closely related to the red-billed pigeon (P. flavirostrus) and the plain pigeon (P. inornata); the three may form a superspecies.

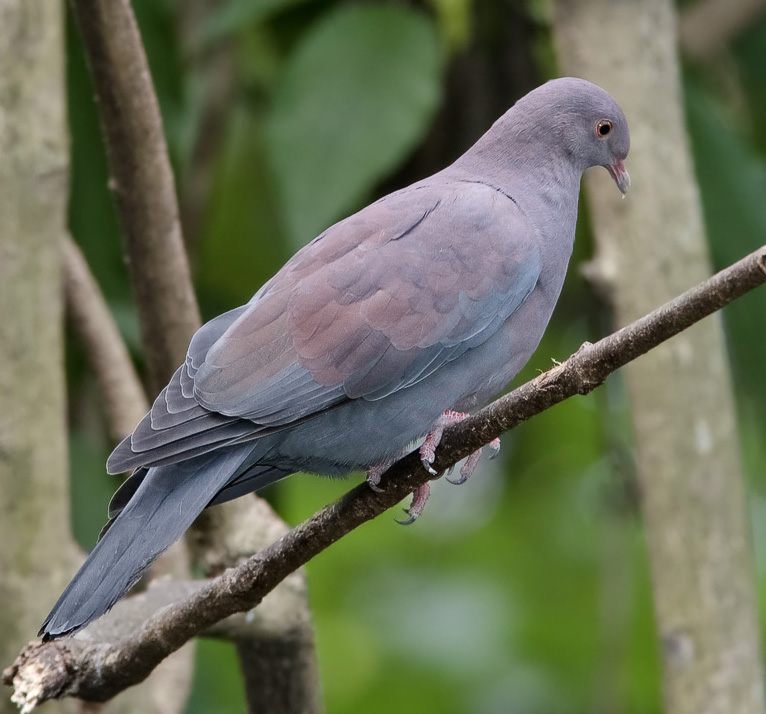
Patagioenas oenops

== Description ==
The male Maranon pigeon is 34 cm (13 in) long and females 31 to 34 cm (12 to 13 in). They weigh about 276 g (9.7 oz). Adult males' head, neck, and breast are dull reddish or reddish purple. The upperparts are blue-gray to dark gray with a purplish chestnut cast on the mid-back and wings. The underparts are light gray and the tail dark gray. The eye is black with orange and blue rings surrounded by bare blue-gray skin. Adult females are duller and browner as are juveniles.

== Distribution and habitat ==
The Maranon pigeon is found from extreme southeastern Ecuador southeast into Peru as far as the Department of La Libertad. It seasonally moves between riparian forest and dryer upslope forest. In elevation it ranges from 850 to 2,400 m (2,790 to 7,870 ft).

== Behavior ==
=== Feeding ===
The Maranon pigeon forages in small groups. Its diet is not well known, but it has been observed eating ripe coca seeds and fruits of Cordia lutea.

=== Breeding ===
Essentially nothing is known about the Maranon pigeon's breeding phenology.

=== Vocalization ===
The Maranon pigeon's song is "a rhythmic series of coos, typically starting with a single note followed by triple notes repeated: 'rwhoOoh...pUh-hu-whoOOo...pUh-hu-whoOOo...pUh-hu-whoOOo...'."

== Status ==
The IUCN has assessed the Maranon pigeon as near threatened. "Habitat loss and degradation are presumably causing declines in both range and its small population."
