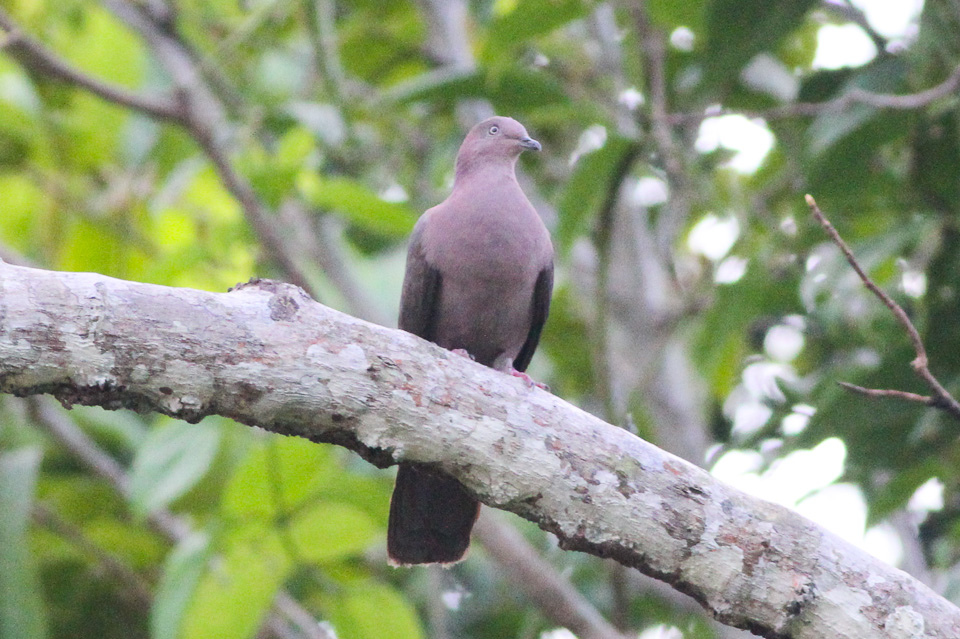

Conservation status
- Least Concern (IUCN 3.1)

Scientific classification
- Domain: Eukaryota
- Kingdom: Animalia
- Phylum: Chordata
- Class: Aves
- Order: Columbiformes
- Family: Columbidae
- Genus: Patagioenas
- Species: P. plumbea

Binomial name
- Patagioenas plumbea (Vieillot, 1818)

Synonyms
- Columba plumbeaVieillot, 1818

= Plumbeous pigeon =

Species of bird

The plumbeous pigeon (Patagioenas plumbea) is a species of bird in the family Columbidae. It is found in Bolivia, Brazil, Colombia, Ecuador, French Guiana, Guyana, Panama, Paraguay, Peru, Suriname, and Venezuela.

== Taxonomy and systematics ==
The plumbeous pigeon is most closely related to the ruddy pigeon (P. subvinacea), short-billed pigeon (P. nigrirostris), and dusky pigeon (P. goodsoni), and they have sometimes been placed in subgenus Oenoenas. These six subspecies are recognized:

- P. p. bogotensis Berlepsch & Leverkühn (1890)
- P. p. chapmani Ridgway (1916)
- P. p. pallescens Snethlage (1908)
- P. p. wallacei C. Chubb (1918)
- P. p. baeri Hellmayr (1908)
- P. p. plumbea Vieillot (1818)

Vocal differences among and even within the subspecies hint that more than one species may be involved.

== Description ==
The plumbeous pigeon is 34 cm (13 in) long and weighs 172 to 231 g (6.1 to 8.1 oz). Males have a dark gray head, neck, and underparts that sometimes have a pinkish or purplish tinge. The shoulders, back, rump, wings, and tail are dark grayish brown to drab olive. The hindneck sometimes has bronzy spots. The eye is red and surrounded by bare purplish red skin. The female's purplish wash is less intense and the neck spots more intense than the male's. Juveniles are duller than the adults, with very little purplish wash, and some feathers have rusty edges. The subspecies differ mostly in the amount and intensity of the pink or purple on the upperparts. Visually the plumbeous pigeon can be confused with the ruddy pigeon (P. subvinacea) where their ranges overlap, but their vocalizations are very different.

== Distribution and habitat ==
The subspecies of plumbeous pigeon are found thus:

- P. p. chapmani – west slope of the Andes from Colombia south to Ecuador's El Oro Province
- P. p. bogotensis – east slope of the Andes from Venezuela and Colombia south to Bolivia's Cochabamba Department
- P. p. wallacei – extreme eastern Venezuela, the Guianas, and eastern Amazonian Brazil as far west as the Rio Negro and Rio Tapajós
- P. p. pallescens – eastern Ecuador, eastern Peru, and western Brazil along the southern tributaries of the Amazon from the Rio Purus to Pará state
- P. p. baeri – Brazil, Goiás and northwestern Minas Gerais states
- P. p. plumbea – eastern Paraguay and southeastern Brazil

The plumbeous pigeon inhabits tropical and subtropical rainforest and cloudforest, both primary and secondary. North of the Rio Orinoco it is found between 1,200 and 1,900 m (3,900 and 6,200 ft) of elevation but south of there only between 200 and 300 m (660 and 980 ft). In southeastern Brazil it makes seasonal altitudinal migrations.

== Behavior ==
=== Feeding ===
The plumbeous pigeon forages in the forest canopy for fruit and seeds. In Brazil it feeds heavily on mistletoe drupes at some times of the year.

=== Breeding ===
The plumbeous pigeon's breeding phenology has not been studied.

=== Vocalization ===
The general pattern of the plumbeous pigeon's song is "a repeated rhythmic phrase of 2–5 coos" and the call is "a purring, drawn-out, slightly overslurred 'rrrrrow'." There are at least five distinct vocal groups whose songs are variations on the general pattern.

== Status ==
The IUCN has assessed the plumbeous pigeon as being of Least Concern. The species is widespread and fairly common throughout.
