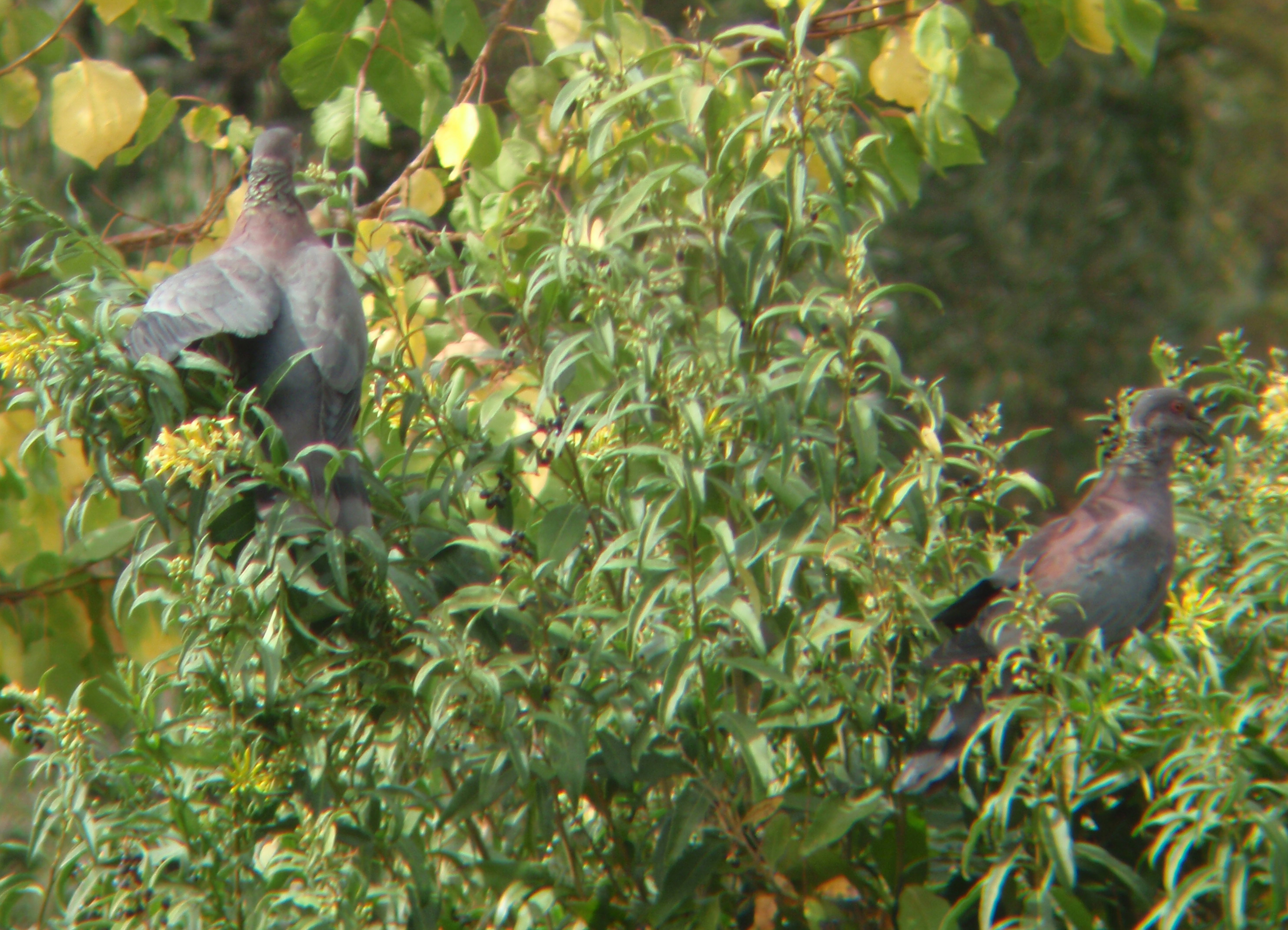

Conservation status
- Least Concern (IUCN 3.1)

Scientific classification
- Kingdom: Animalia
- Phylum: Chordata
- Class: Aves
- Order: Columbiformes
- Family: Columbidae
- Genus: Patagioenas
- Species: P. araucana

Binomial name
- Patagioenas araucana (Lesson, RP & Garnot, 1827)

Synonyms
- Columba araucana Lesson, 1827

= Chilean pigeon =

Species of bird

The Chilean pigeon (Patagioenas araucana) is a species of bird in the family Columbidae. It is found in Chile and Argentina.

== Taxonomy and systematics ==
The Chilean pigeon is monotypic. It, ring-tailed pigeon (Patagioenas caribaea), and band-tailed pigeon (P. fasciata) may form a superspecies.

== Description ==
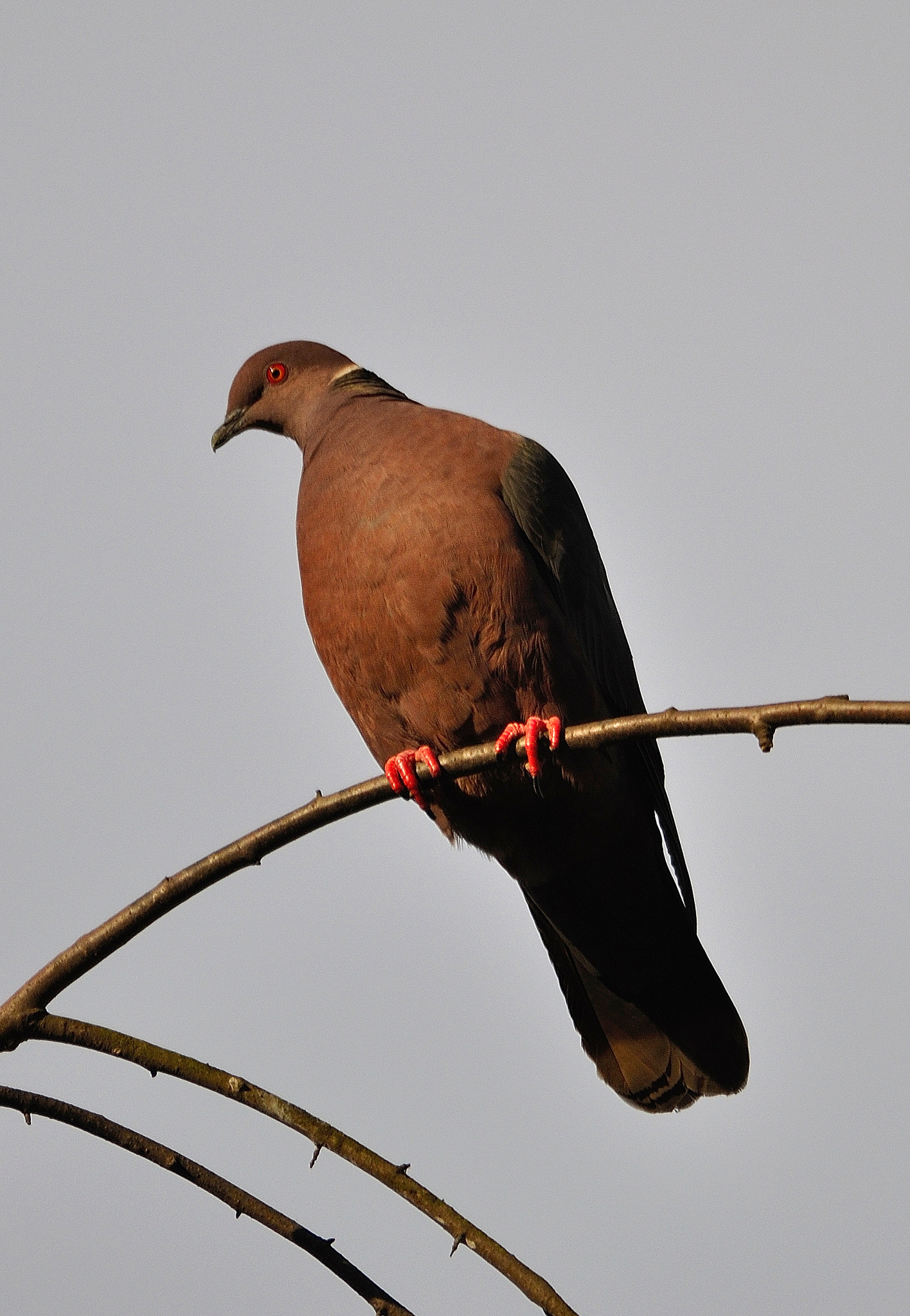
Chilean pigeon in the Biobío Region, Chile

The Chilean pigeon is 35 to 37 cm (14 to 15 in) long and weighs 220 to 340 g (7.8 to 12.0 oz). The adult male is mostly reddish purple. Its nape is iridescent green with a narrow white line across its top. Its lower back, rump, and tail are gray; the tail has a broad black band across its middle. The wings are gray to black. The orange eye is surrounded by a narrow pink or yellow ring and bare purple skin. Adult females are duller and browner than the males and juveniles are overall shades of gray.

== Distribution and habitat ==
The Chilean pigeon is found in its namesake country from the Coquimbo Region south to the Aysén Region and in Argentina immediately adjoining the southern half of its Chilean range. In much of its range it inhabits southern temperate forests, with an affinity for those dominated by Araucaria and Nothofagus. It is found in dryer forest in the northern part of its range, and is also known to forage in open habitats near forests.

== Behavior ==
=== Feeding ===
The Chilean pigeon mostly forages in trees for fruit, but it will also feed on seeds in open areas.

=== Breeding ===
The Chilean pigeon's breeding season extends from December to at least March and possibly to May. It is a colonial breeder. Up to several hundred pairs will nest in the forest interior, often in a bamboo thicket. The nest is a flimsy platform of sticks through which the single egg can be seen.

=== Vocalization ===
The Chilean pigeon's song is "a series of deep hoos" or "a deep doubled hooo-HOOOO hooo-HOOOO hooo-HOOOO...".

== Status ==
The IUCN has assessed the Chilean pigeon as being of Least Concern. However, "[d]eforestation of old-growth forests has become a problem, as it leads to fragmentation and habitat reduction".
