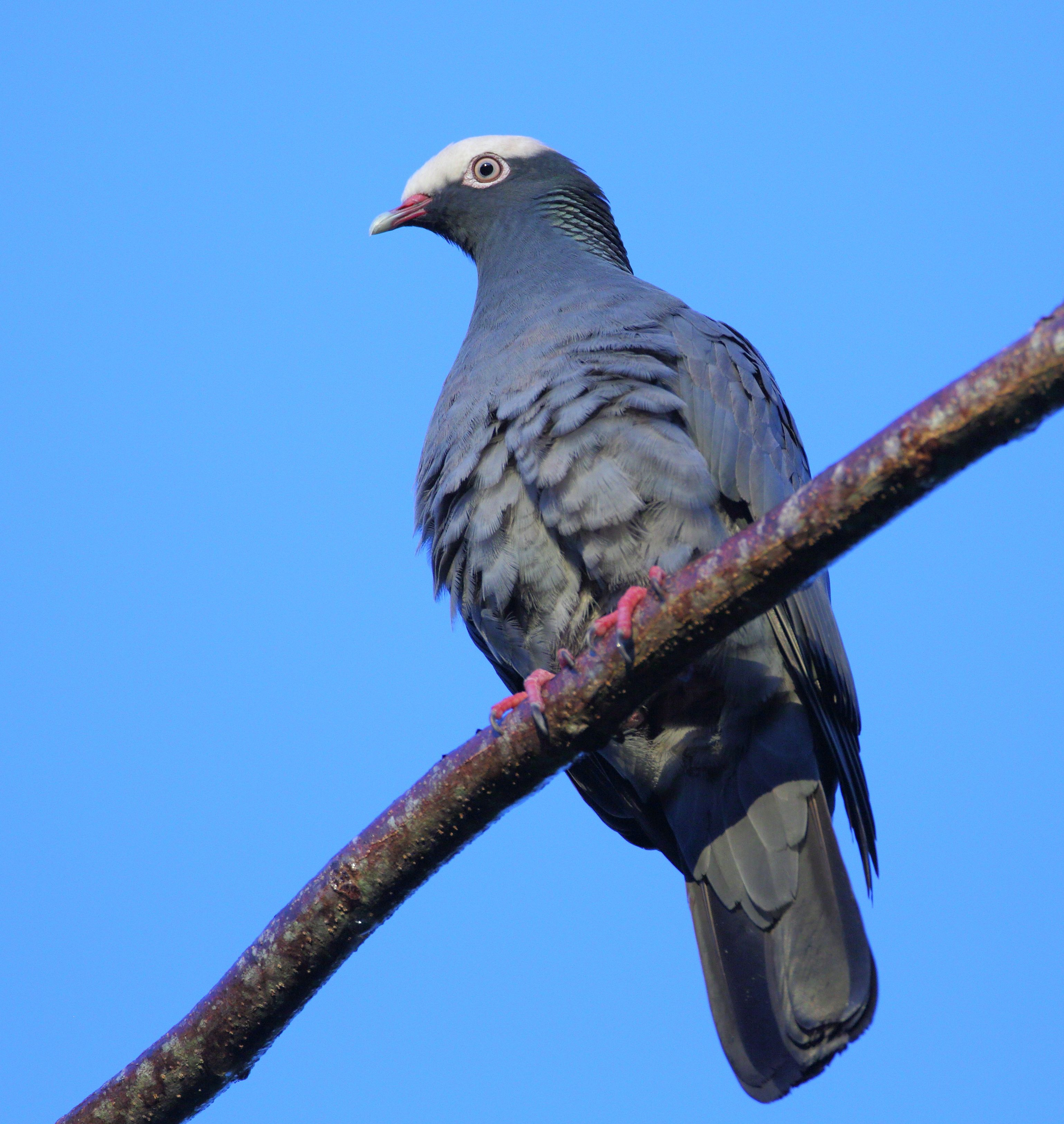
- White-crowned pigeon (Patagioenas leucocephala)

Scientific classification
- Kingdom: Animalia
- Phylum: Chordata
- Class: Aves
- Order: Columbiformes
- Family: Columbidae
- Subfamily: Columbinae
- Genus: Patagioenas; Reichenbach, 1852

Type species
- Columba leucocephala (white-crowned pigeon) Linnaeus, 1758

Species
- 17, see text.

Synonyms
- Chloroenas Reichenbach, 1852; Lepidoenas Reichenbach, 1852; Chloraenas Bonaparte, 1854 (unj. emend.); Crossophthalmus Bonaparte, 1854 (nomen nudum); Lepidaenas Bonaparte, 1854 (unj. emend.); Patagiaenas Bonaparte, 1854 (unj. emend.); Chloraenos Bonaparte, 1856 (missp.); Patagiaena Bonaparte, 1856 (missp.); Patagoenas Heine & Reichenow, 1890 (missp.); Oenoenas Salvadori, 1893

= Patagioenas =

Genus of pigeons

Patagioenas is a genus of New World pigeons whose distinctness from the genus Columba was long disputed but ultimately confirmed. It is basal to the Columba — Streptopelia radiation with their ancestors diverging from that lineage likely over 8 million years ago. While the biogeographic pattern of this group suggests that the ancestors of typical pigeons and turtle doves settled the Old World from the Americas, Patagioenas may also be the offspring of Old World pigeons that radiated into different genera later, given that the cuckoo-doves (Macropygia) of Southeast Asia also seem to be closely related.

== Taxonomy ==
The genus Patagioenas was introduced by German naturalist Ludwig Reichenbach in 1853, with the white-crowned pigeon (Patagioenas leucocephala) as the type species. The genus name combines the Ancient Greek patageō meaning "to clatter" and oinas meaning "pigeon".

There are 17 species of Patagioenas, which can be assigned to four groups based on mtDNA cytochrome b, cytochrome c oxidase subunit I, and NADH dehydrogenase subunit 2, as well as the nuclear β-fibrinogen intron 7 data combined with analyses of vocalizations and morphology. They could be considered subgenera, but one remains unnamed so they are only informally listed here:

caribaea (band-tailed) group (Chloroenas): Characterized by tails with terminal bands and iridescent neck; rows of low single coos. Apparently the most basal group.

- Band-tailed pigeon, Patagioenas fasciata
- Chilean pigeon, Patagioenas araucana
- Ring-tailed pigeon, Patagioenas caribaea

leucocephala group (Patagioenas sensu stricto): Characterized by iridescent neck and dark plumage, or white edged outer wing coverts, or scaly appearance; groups of triple coos with the first call in each drawn out except in speciosa

- White-crowned pigeon, Patagioenas leucocephala
- Scaly-naped pigeon, Patagioenas squamosa
- Scaled pigeon, Patagioenas speciosa
- Picazuro pigeon, Patagioenas picazuro
- Bare-eyed pigeon, Patagioenas corensis
- Spot-winged pigeon, Patagioenas maculosa

cayennensis group: No display plumage except iridescent head in cayennensis; groups of double or triple coos with the first call in each short

- Pale-vented pigeon, Patagioenas cayennensis
- Red-billed pigeon, Patagioenas flavirostris
- Maranon pigeon, Patagioenas oenops
- Plain pigeon, Patagioenas inornata

plumbea group (Oenoenas): Small size, plain plumage, rounded tails, small bills, phrase composed of high single coos

- Plumbeous pigeon, Patagioenas plumbea
- Ruddy pigeon, Patagioenas subvinacea
- Short-billed pigeon, Patagioenas nigrirostris
- Dusky pigeon, Patagioenas goodsoni

== Sources ==
- Cheke, Anthony S. (2005). Naming segregates from the Columba–Streptopelia pigeons following DNA studies on phylogeny. Bull. B.O.C. 125(4): 293–295. PDF fulltext
- Johnson, K.P.; De Kort, S; Dinwoodey, K.; Mateman, A.C.; Ten Cate, C.; Lessells, C.M.; Clayton, D.H. (2001). "A molecular phylogeny of the dove genera Streptopelia and Columba". Auk. 118 (4): 874–887. doi:10.1642/0004-8038(2001)118[0874:AMPOTD]2.0.CO;2. hdl:20.500.11755/a92515bb-c1c6-4c0e-ae9a-849936c41ca2.
- Mahler, Bettina & Tubaro, Pablo L. (2001). Relationship between song characters and morphology in New World pigeons. Biol. J. Linn. Soc. 74(4): 533–539. doi:10.1006/bijl.2001.0596 (HTML abstract)
