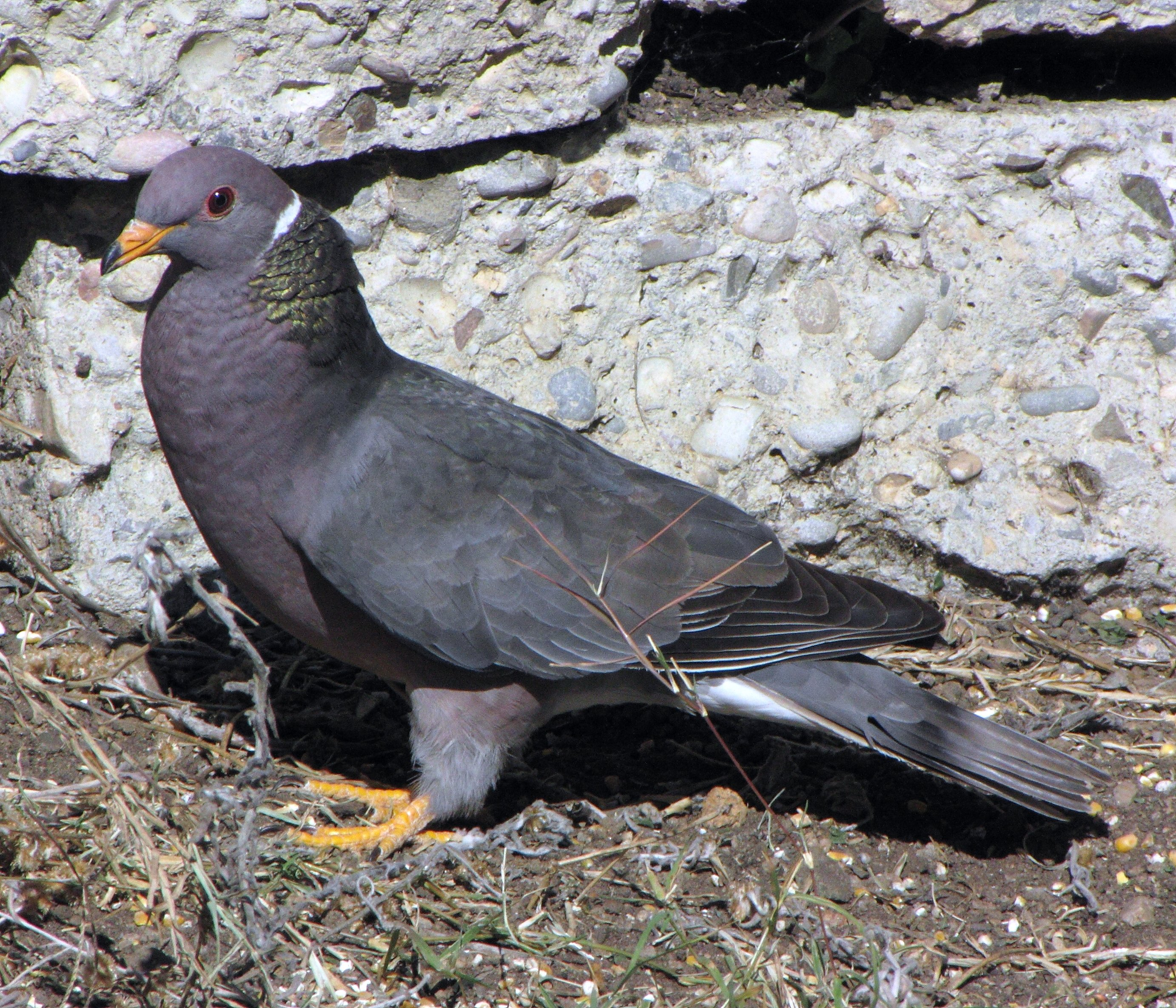
- P. f. monilis in San Luis Obispo, California, USA

Conservation status
- Least Concern (IUCN 3.1)

- Apparently Secure (NatureServe)

Scientific classification
- Kingdom: Animalia
- Phylum: Chordata
- Class: Aves
- Order: Columbiformes
- Family: Columbidae
- Genus: Patagioenas
- Species: P. fasciata

Binomial name
- Patagioenas fasciata (Say, 1822)
- Range of P. fasciata Breeding Year-round Nonbreeding

Synonyms
- Columba fasciata Say, 1822 Patagioenas albilinea (Bonaparte, 1854)

= Band-tailed pigeon =

Species of bird

The band-tailed pigeon (Patagioenas fasciata) is a pigeon native to the Americas, and one of the largest pigeons in this region. It is largely gray, but with a thin white collar on the nape and a purple-gray breast.

== Description ==
The band-tailed pigeon is one of the largest pigeons in the Americas, measuring 33 to 40 cm (13 to 16 in) long and weighing 226–460 g (8.0–16.2 oz), with the males on average slightly larger than females, but with much overlap. Although sometimes cited as the largest North American pigeon, the red-billed pigeon (P. flavirostris) is about the same size, weighing 268–424 g (9.5–15.0 oz). Band-tailed pigeons have thick-based, pointed wings, with a wingspan of 66 cm (26 in).

The plumage is gray, somewhat darker above. The head and underparts have a faint pink cast, especially in the adult male; the belly is nearly white. The distal half of the tail is also pale (except in the subspecies of Baja California) with a darker gray band at the base, whence the English name. The bill and feet are yellow, good identification marks at sufficiently close range. Adults have green iridescence on the back of the neck, adjacent to the thin white collar on the nape. Juvenile birds have pale feather edges above, giving a scaly appearance, and lack the white collar and neck iridescence.

== Taxonomy ==
Its closest living relatives are the Chilean pigeon P. araucana and the ring-tailed pigeon P. caribaea, which form a superspecies within Patagioenas.

=== Subspecies ===
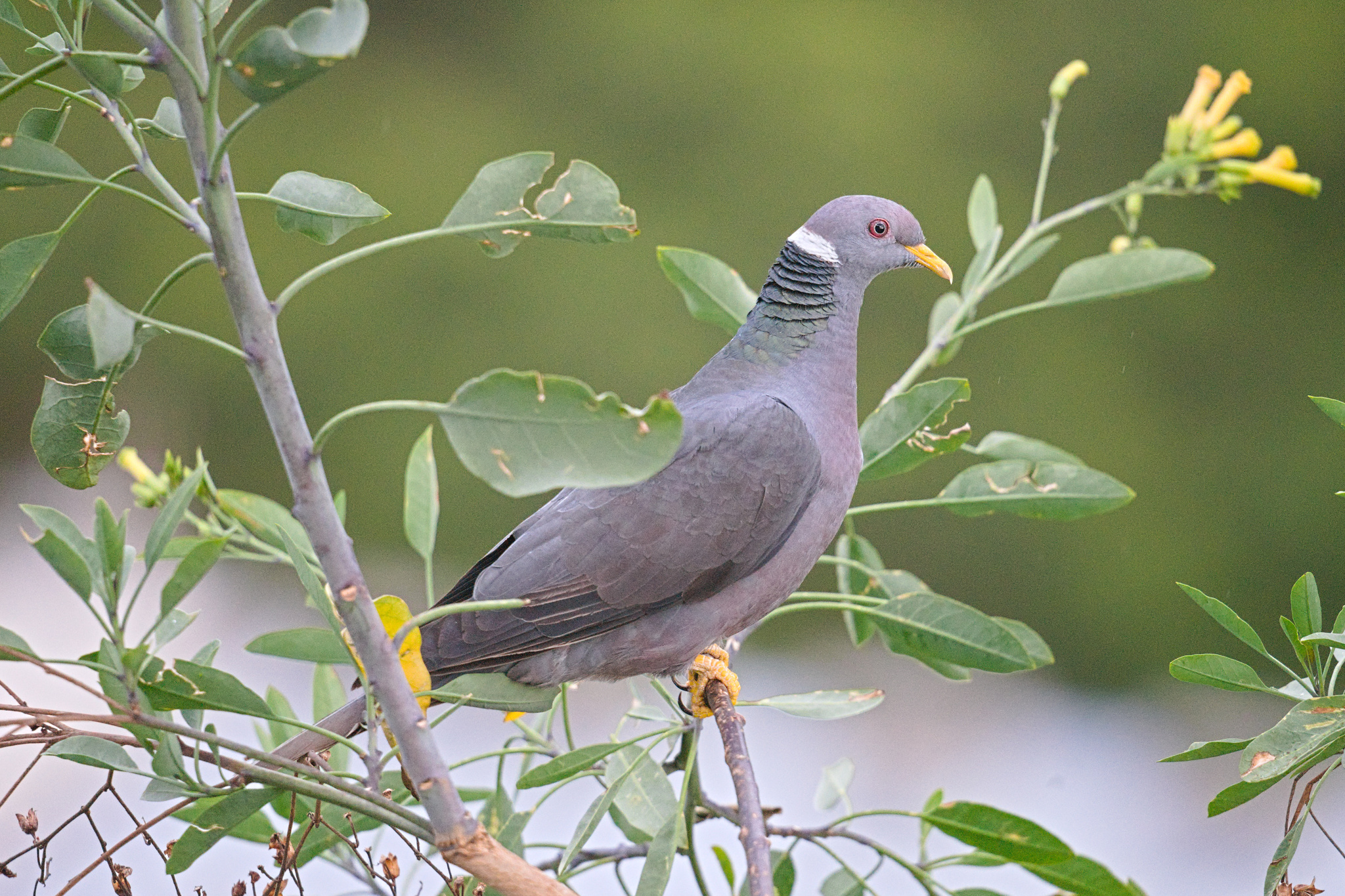
Patagioenas fasciata albilinea in the Andes near Quito, Ecuador; note the all-yellow bill

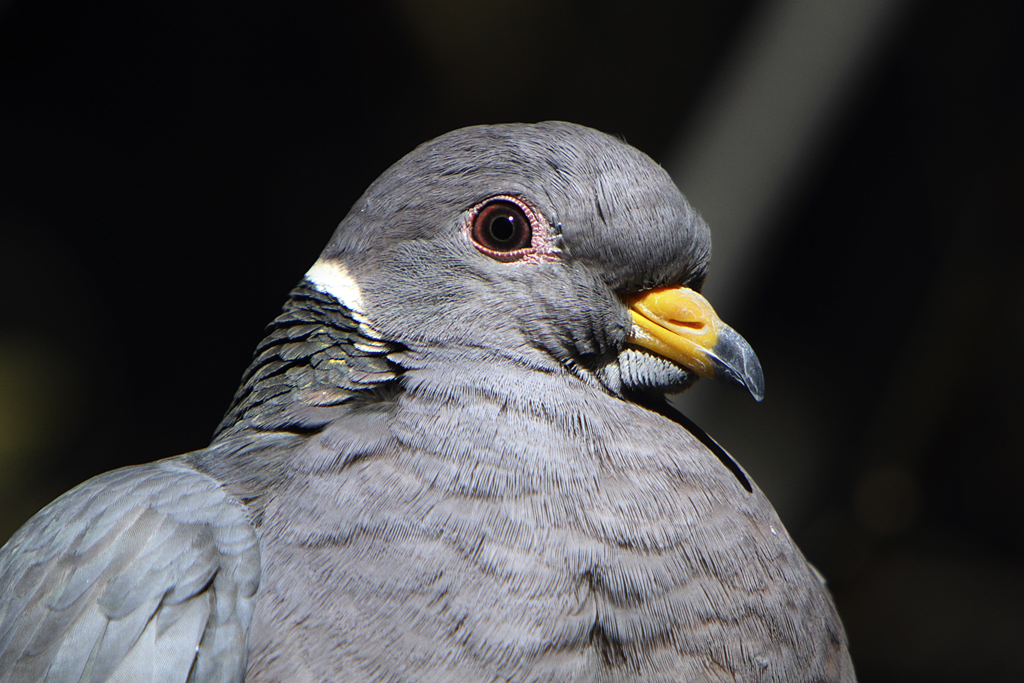
Patagioenas fasciata fasciata in Arizona; upper body; note the black tip on the bill

Six subspecies are accepted; they form two groups of three subspecies, with some authorities splitting these two groups into separate species, the northern band-tailed pigeon (Patagioenas fasciata) and the southern band-tailed pigeon (Patagioenas albilinea).

Northern group (Patagioenas fasciata sensu stricto):

- Patagioenas fasciata monilis (N. A. Vigors, 1839) — Pacific Coast in southeast Alaska, western British Columbia, Washington, Oregon, California, and Baja California
- Patagioenas fasciata fasciata (Say, 1822) — Interior western U.S. in Utah, New Mexico, Arizona, Colorado, and Mexico south to Nicaragua
- Patagioenas fasciata vioscae (Brewster, 1888) — Sierra de la Laguna mountains in Baja California Sur

Southern group ("Patagioenas albilinea"):

- Patagioenas fasciata crissalis (Salvadori, 1893) — Central America in Costa Rica and western Panama
- Patagioenas fasciata albilinea (Bonaparte, 1854) — In the Andes Mountains of Colombia, Venezuela, northwestern Brazil, eastern Bolivia, and northwestern Argentina
- Patagioenas fasciata roraimae (Chapman, 1929) — Tepuis of southern Venezuela (Mount Roraima)

The two groups differ in bill color; the northern group have a black tip to the yellow bill, while in the southern group, the bill is all-yellow. The southern group also have somewhat darker-toned plumage.

=== Relation to the Extinct Passenger Pigeon ===
The genus Patagioenas is the most closely related living genus to the extinct passenger pigeon, and as a species of this genus, the band-tailed pigeon has been investigated for the potential use in efforts to bring back the passenger pigeon species.

The parasitic louse Columbicola extinctus, believed to have become extinct with the extinction of the passenger pigeon, was recently rediscovered on the band-tailed pigeon.

== Distribution and habitat ==
Unlike the majority of other birds, band-tailed pigeons roam throughout the year, not having a single home range. However, they are usually found at higher elevations, in coniferous forests, oak woodlands, and scrublands. It ranges from British Columbia, Washington, Oregon, California, and southern Arizona south in higher elevations through Mexico and Central America and down the Andes to northern Argentina. It lives primarily in damp forests and conifer-oak woodlands of the western mountains and coasts.

Band-tailed pigeons are nomadic feeders, changing their diet along the seasons, and will travel up to 5 km (3 miles) away from their nests to feed.

As forest birds, they feed from the floor and from trees. Their diets are centered on acorns, though they will also feed on berries, seeds, flowers, leaves, and even insects. In times of food scarcity, they move closer to urban areas, being found in the suburbs, in forested parks, orchards, and even backyards.

== Conservation ==
According to the North American Breeding Survey, the population of band-tailed pigeons in North America has declined at an average rate of 2% every year since 1968, primarily due to deforestation. Forest management, a practice that is supposed to promote forest environmental, economic, and social goals, can harm the band-tailed pigeons due to its suppression of shrubs and hardwood growth. While forest management can help these birds in terms of nesting habitats, they rely heavily on hardwoods and fruit and nut producing shrubs for food during breeding seasons.

In California, agriculture and urban sprawl (the expansion of low-density housing developments) lead to significant declines in valley and blue oak woodland habitats. While humans modify these important habitat, band-tailed pigeons rely on them during winter as a source of food in the form of acorn mast.

Band-tailed pigeons typically produce one egg per nesting attempt, factoring into its declining population.

Avian trichomonosis, caused by the protozoan parasite Trichomonas gallinae, is a major concern to the band-tailed pigeons and has killed thousands of these birds during winter seasons. Several organizations actively monitor harvested birds for the presence of these disease causing protozoa. This disease is particularly prevalent in populations that have adapted to use suburban habitats, where they come into contact with introduced feral pigeons which carry the disease.

Hunting is also a problem for the species, causing declines in some areas.

== Behavior and ecology ==
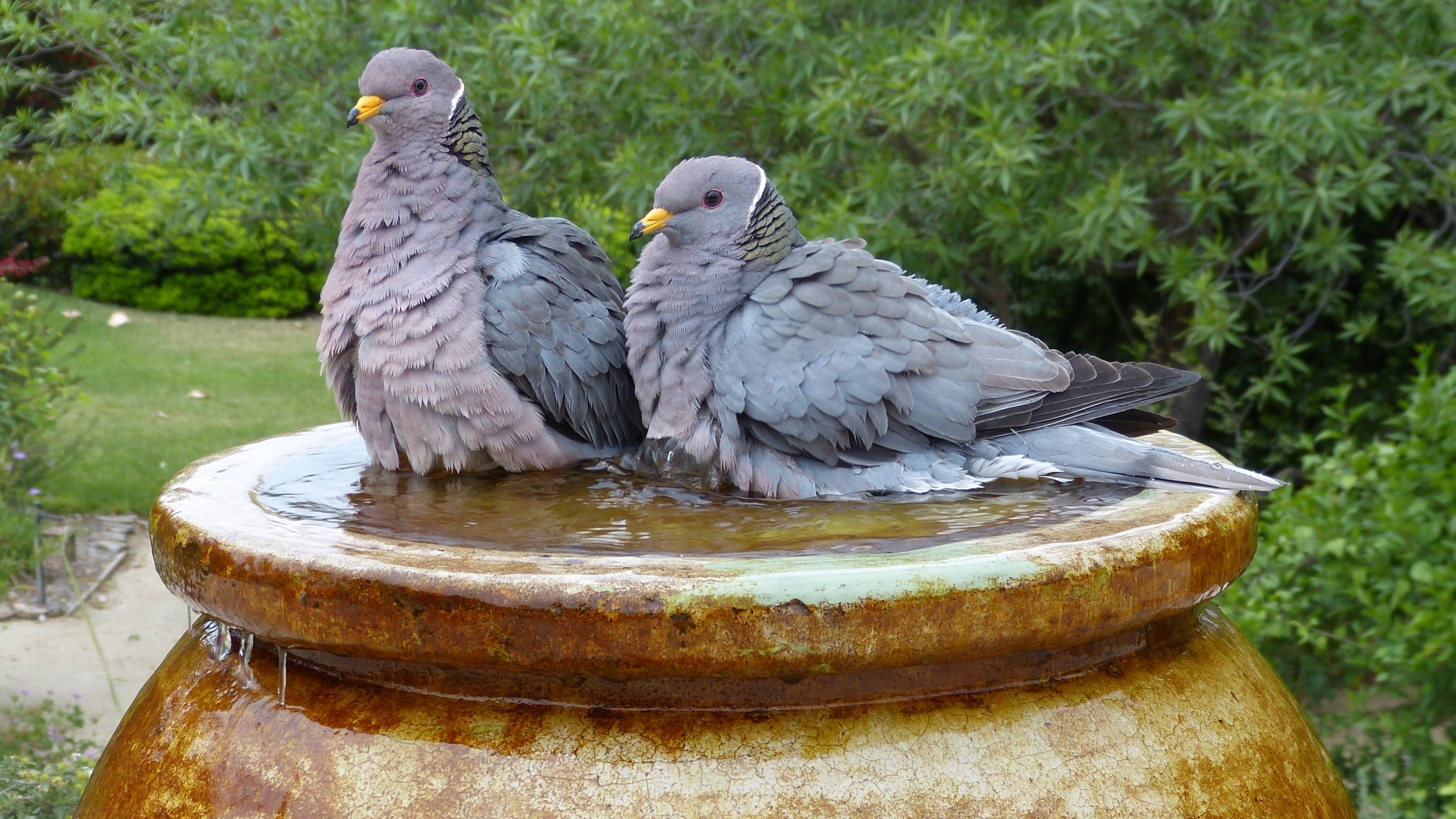
Band-tailed pigeons bathing in a suburban garden in California; situations like this allow for trichomonosis infection

This species is relatively quiet for a pigeon. Its voice is low-pitched and owl-like, often in two-syllable calls that rise and then fall (huu-ooh) with even spacing between calls. It also makes a variety of harsh squawking sounds for a variety of reasons. They are swift and agile fliers, allowing them to navigate through these high treetops and branches. When flying, they create a "wing whistle", a distinctive noise heard from many other pigeon species as well.

It builds a rudimentary platform nest out of twigs, in which it lays one or two eggs. Outside the breeding season, it forms flocks, ranging up to 300 birds, often becomes nomadic, following the acorn crop or moving to lower altitudes or other areas outside its breeding range. They commonly congregate at and drink from mineral springs, although it is not fully understood why.

=== Reproduction ===
Band-tailed pigeons form pairs to build nests, with the female building the nests in trees out of twigs, often closely together to form small colonies. Usually, there is just one egg in a clutch, occasionally two; about 8% of nests have two eggs. The eggs hatch after around three weeks after the parents take turns incubating them. Adult band-tailed pigeons can raise multiple broods per year, each typically leaving the nest after 25-30 days. Subsequent broods may be started before the young of the previous brood has fledged; newly fledged young can be found at any time of the year, with (in North America) the majority from June to November.

Both adult pigeons begin producing crop milk a few days before their eggs hatch. This is a nutrient-dense substance that pigeons and doves produce in the crop (a section of their lower esophagus). This pigeon milk is unique, more solid, and yellowish color, than mammalian milk, and contains very high levels of fats, proteins, antioxidants, and immune-enhancing substances. To feed their hatchlings, adult band-tailed pigeons regurgitate the crop milk into their mouths during the first few weeks of their lives, up to about 30 days. After this short period, the parents stop producing crop milk and start feeding their hatchlings regular softened food that is also fed by regurgitation.
