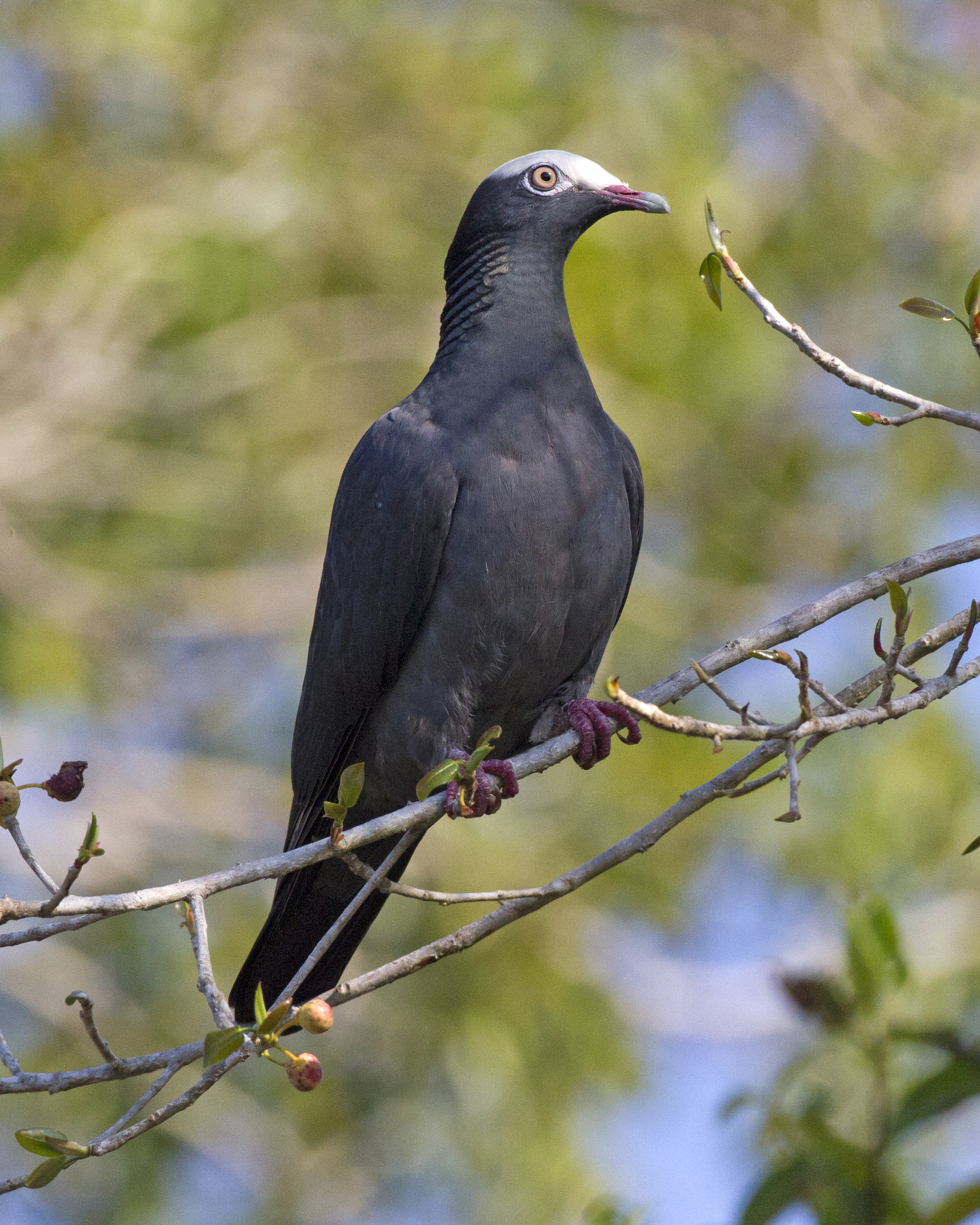
- In Florida, USA

Conservation status
- Near Threatened (IUCN 3.1)

- Vulnerable (NatureServe)

Scientific classification
- Kingdom: Animalia
- Phylum: Chordata
- Class: Aves
- Order: Columbiformes
- Family: Columbidae
- Genus: Patagioenas
- Species: P. leucocephala

Binomial name
- Patagioenas leucocephala (Linnaeus, 1758)

Synonyms
- Columba leucocephala Linnaeus, 1758

= White-crowned pigeon =

Species of bird

The white-crowned pigeon (Patagioenas leucocephala) is a fruit and seed-eating species of bird in the dove and pigeon family Columbidae. It is found primarily in the Caribbean.

John James Audubon painted these pigeons, including the watercolour painting in his work, Birds of America, published in the early 19th century.

== Taxonomy ==
In the first half of the 18th century the white-crowned pigeon was described and illustrated by several naturalists including John Ray in 1713, Hans Sloane in 1725 and Mark Catesby in 1731. When in 1758 the Swedish naturalist Carl Linnaeus updated his Systema Naturae for the tenth edition, he placed the white-crowned pigeon with all the other pigeons in the genus Columba. Linnaeus included a brief description, coined the binomial name Columba leucocephala and cited the earlier authors. The specific epithet combines the Ancient Greek leukos meaning "white" and -kephalos meaning "-headed". Although Linnaeus gave the location as North America, the type locality is taken to be the Bahamas following Catesby. The species is now placed in the genus Patagioenas that was introduced by the German naturalist Ludwig Reichenbach in 1853 with the white-crowned pigeon as the type species. The species is monotypic: no subspecies are recognised.

== Description ==
White-crowned pigeon drawing by Audubon

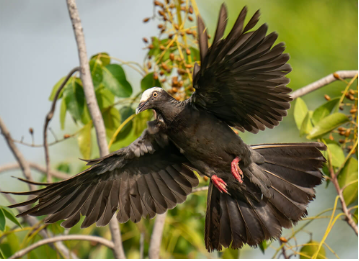
A white-crowned pigeon in the Florida Keys National Marine Sanctuary.

The white-crowned pigeon can measure 29–35 cm (11–14 in) in length, span 48–59 cm (19–23 in) across the wings, and weigh 150–301 g (5.3–10.6 oz). It is around the same size as the common rock pigeon, but weighs a bit less since it is generally less chunky and has a relatively longer and more square tail. Adult birds' plumage varies from a slate gray to an almost-black color. Its iridescent collar-patch is notably only seen under good lighting, shining a barred white pattern with green. Their distinct crown-patch can vary in shade of color from a more bright white in males to a more gray-white in most females. Juveniles can have a grayish-brown color for They have a white iris and a pale-tipped red bill. Juveniles are a less dark shade of grey, lack the nape pattern and white iris, and show only a few pale feathers on the crown. Their call is a loud, deep coo-cura-coo or coo-croo. This species is a member of a diverse clade of Patagioenas which vary much in appearance, but are united by their triple coos (except in the scaled pigeon).

== Distribution and habitat ==
It is a resident breeder mainly in the Bahamas, Cuba, Jamaica and Antigua. It breeds in smaller numbers in Hispaniola (the Dominican Republic and Haiti), Puerto Rico, the Virgin Islands, the Cayman Islands, Anguilla and other Caribbean islands. It also breeds along the Caribbean coast of Central America. In the United States, it is found only in the Florida Keys, Everglades, and the southern tip of mainland Florida. They will often spend the winter in the Caribbean islands. It has been spotted as far south as Fuerte Island, off of the northern coast of Colombia.

The white-crowned pigeon primarily lives and breeds in nest colonies or individually in low lying, coastal, mangrove forests, and will travel inland to feed on the fruits and seeds of a wide variety of plants. In Florida, the white-crowned pigeon has historically been documented nesting exclusively on remote, tidally inundated mangrove islands in wildlife refuges. Recent observations have confirmed nesting on the southern tip of mainland Florida.

With few exceptions, this species requires isolated offshore mangrove islets with limited disturbance for breeding. These tidally inundated mangrove islands which provide some protection from predators such as raccoons. However, several instances of white-crowned pigeons nesting in heavily trafficked, urban areas, such as downtown Key West and Miami Florida, have recently been observed. This could be due to habitat loss as a result of hurricanes, and/or increased predation pressure in their historic nesting habitat.

== Threats and conservation ==
A main threat to this species is loss of habitat due to deforestation and habitat degradation. The white-crowned pigeon needs two distinct habitats: one for nesting and one for feeding. They typically breed in coastal red mangroves (Rhizophora mangle), which continue to be clear-cut for crops such as sugarcane. Agriculture and deforestation have become a problem for the species' feeding grounds, typically inland hardwood forests. The bird is very skittish, and is known to simply abandon its nest when it is encroached upon. In Florida, white-crowned pigeons often feed on the fruit of poisonwood (Metopium toxiferum). Unfortunately, this native plant causes severe human dermatitis and is often removed.

The white-crowned pigeon is also hunted, often illegally, throughout much of its range. Although, changes have been made to hunting regulations in the Bahamas, illegal hunting is still a problem for these pigeons.

Other threats to this species in Florida include additional mortality collisions with man-made objects and pesticide use. These birds are "threatened by the slaughter of nesting birds on its Caribbean breeding grounds"; they may play a vitally important, yet not fully understood, role in the seed dispersal of West Indian flora.
