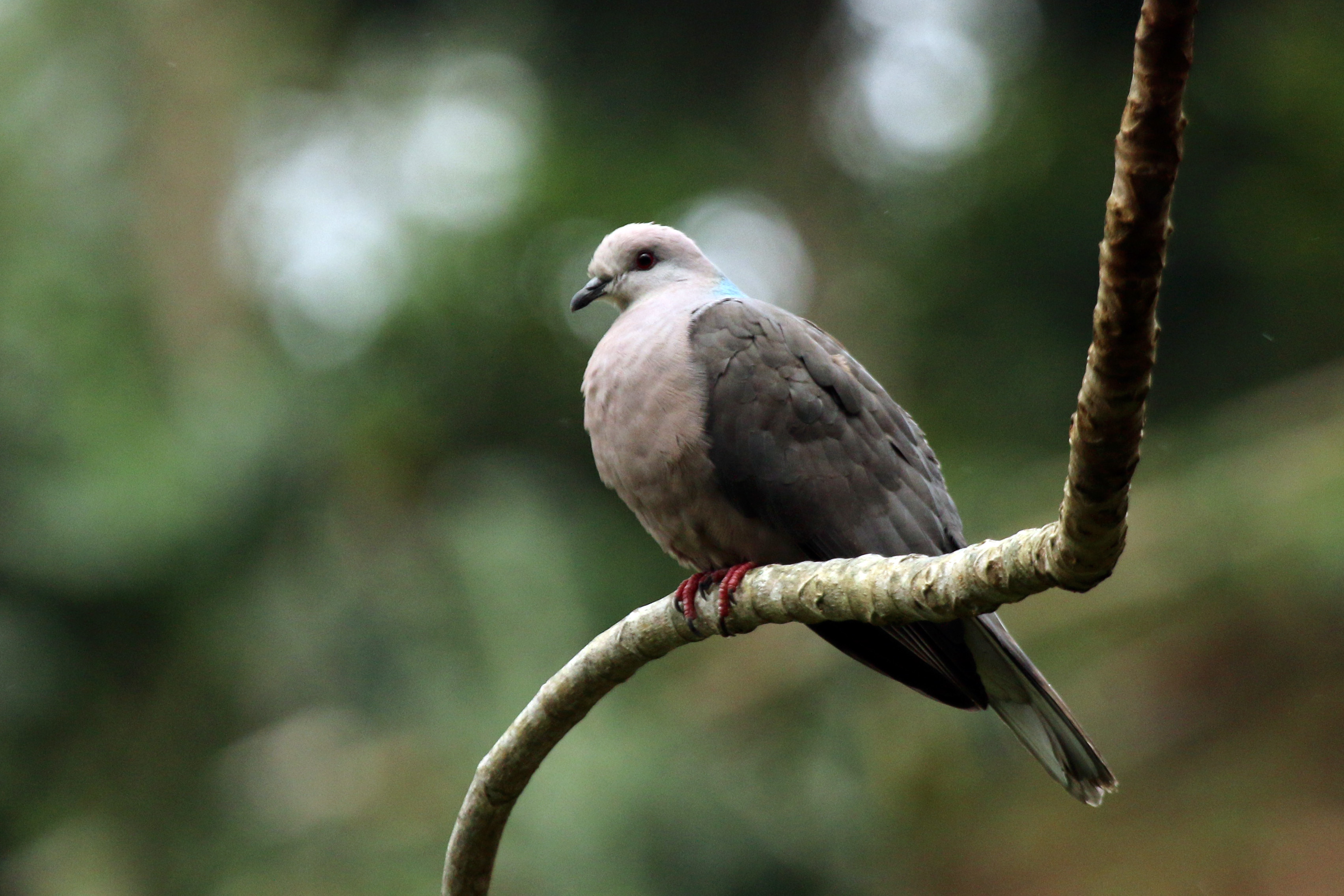

Conservation status
- Vulnerable (IUCN 3.1)

Scientific classification
- Domain: Eukaryota
- Kingdom: Animalia
- Phylum: Chordata
- Class: Aves
- Order: Columbiformes
- Family: Columbidae
- Genus: Patagioenas
- Species: P. caribaea

Binomial name
- Patagioenas caribaea (Jacquin, 1784)
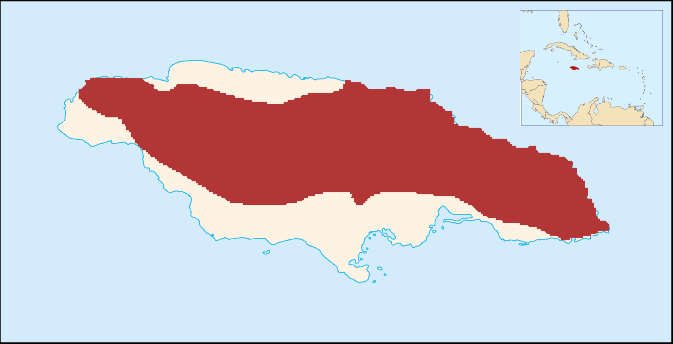
- Distribution of the ring-tailed pigeon

Synonyms
- Columba caribaea Jacquin, 1784

= Ring-tailed pigeon =

Species of bird

The ring-tailed pigeon (Patagioenas caribaea) is a species of bird in the family Columbidae. It is endemic to Jamaica.

== Taxonomy and systematics ==
The ring-tailed pigeon is monotypic. Along with the Chilean pigeon (P. araycana) and band-tailed pigeon (P. fasciata), it may form a superspecies.

== Description ==
The male ring-tailed pigeon is 38 to 48.5 cm (15.0 to 19.1 in) long and the female 38 to 43 cm (15 to 17 in). One bird whose sex was not reported weighed 250 g (8.8 oz). The adult male's head, neck, and underparts are reddish to pinkish. Its hindneck has a metallic green or bronze patch and the rest of the upperparts are brownish gray. The tail is gray (darker near the body) with a slate band across its middle. The eye is orange surrounded by bare red skin. The adult female is similar to the male but with an olive or brown cast to the wings, redder underparts, and a less metallic hindneck. The juvenile is mostly grayish with a brown cast and a fawn to cinnamon belly.

== Distribution and habitat ==
The ring-tailed pigeon is found only in Jamaica, and is most common in the John Crow Mountains, the eastern Blue Mountains, and the Cockpit Country. It mostly inhabits wet highland forest, and wet limestone forest in the Cockpit Country. In elevation it ranges as high as 2,000 m (6,600 ft).

== Behaviour ==
=== Feeding ===
The ring-tailed pigeon feeds only on fruit, often taken while climbing or hanging upside-down in trees.

=== Breeding ===
The ring-tailed pigeon breeds in spring and summer. The nest is a thick platform made of twigs and lined with leaves and bark. It is placed high in a tree and hidden in climbing vegetation.

=== Vocalisation ===
The ring-tailed pigeon's advertising call is "a series of 4–5 cooing notes" rendered as "cooOOh...cooOOh...cooOOh...".

== Status ==
The IUCN initially assessed the ring-tailed pigeon as Critically Endangered but since 2000 has rated it Vulnerable "because anecdotal evidence and the many threats it faces indicate that the range and population must now be small and declining." "Both hunting and forest destruction remain rampant, and pose very serious threats".
