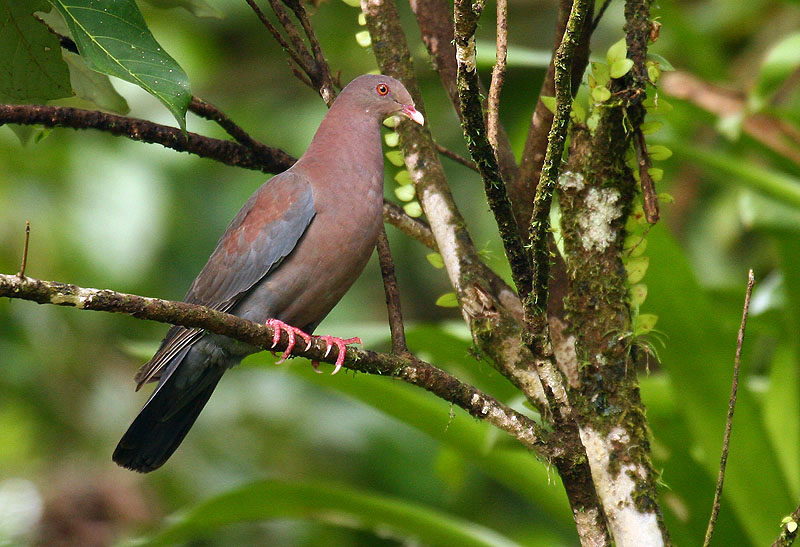

Conservation status
- Least Concern (IUCN 3.1)

Scientific classification
- Kingdom: Animalia
- Phylum: Chordata
- Class: Aves
- Order: Columbiformes
- Family: Columbidae
- Genus: Patagioenas
- Species: P. flavirostris

Binomial name
- Patagioenas flavirostris (Wagler, 1831)

Synonyms
- Columba flavirostris Wagler, 1831

= Red-billed pigeon =

Species of bird

The red-billed pigeon (Patagioenas flavirostris) is a relatively large, robust species of pigeon. Its breeding range extends from southern Texas, United States, to Costa Rica. It is primarily found throughout coastal and lowland areas of Mexico and Central America. It belongs to a clade of Patagioenas which generally lack iridescent display plumage, except some vestiges in the pale-vented pigeon.

== Description ==
Red-billed pigeons have largely dark, slate-gray plumage with a more maroon, though sometimes described as purple, head, neck, and wing coverts. They have pale red eyes with an orange orbital ring, along with a red bill with a yellow tip. Noticeably, they don't have iridescent collar plumage. A blue-gray belly and tail coverts, as well as a less brown back, distinguish it from most other species., such as the Ruddy Pigeon and Short-billed Pigeon. The only noticeable difference between males and females is that the females have a duller colored head and neck. Juveniles are often even more dull in color and have dark and dusky shoulders, as well as a more brown mantle and wings.

Compared to other birds, they are a more mid-to-large sized bird, growing to be between 30 and 37 cm (12–15 in.) in length and a weight of 230–425 g (8.1–15.0 oz).

Red-billed pigeons have a very distinctive call, described to be a long, high-pitched call consisting of a coooo followed by three cuk-c'-c'-coo notes. It follows an ascending sound. When taking off, the birds' wings create a noticeable clapping noise.

== Distribution and habitat ==
Red-billed pigeons are common throughout dry forests in primarily coastal Mexico and Central America, most common in Rio Grande, though still an uncommon find during summertime. They can sometimes be found in Southern Texas, with a declining population. In almost all areas, they are rare to see during the winter.

Red-tailed pigeons have four reported subspecies:

- restricta, W Mexico, from WC Sonora to Sinaloa (van Rossem 1930)
- madrensis, Tres Marías Island (off WC Mexico) (Nelson 1898)
- flavirostris, lower lower Rio Grande Valley in Texas through SE Sonora, Sierra Madre in Chihuahua, and San Luis Potosí S to Nicaragua and E Costa Rica (Wagler 1831)
- minima, lowlands of Costa Rica about Gulf of Nicoya (Carriker 1910)

Habitat can vary. Red-billed pigeons are most notably in dry woods and along riverside wetland areas.
