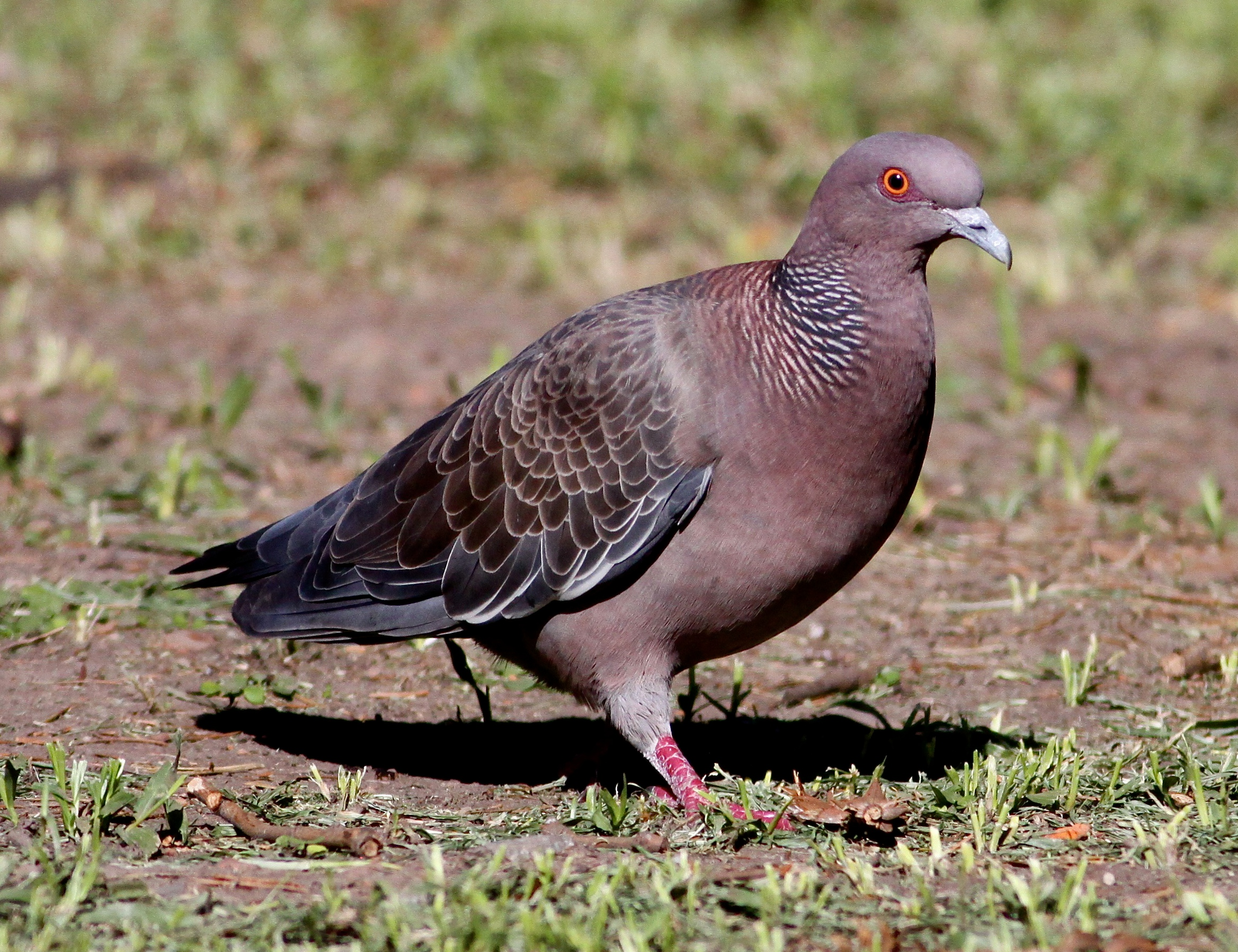
- In Buenos Aires , Argentina

Conservation status
- Least Concern (IUCN 3.1)

Scientific classification
- Kingdom: Animalia
- Phylum: Chordata
- Class: Aves
- Order: Columbiformes
- Family: Columbidae
- Genus: Patagioenas
- Species: P. picazuro

Binomial name
- Patagioenas picazuro (Temminck, 1813)
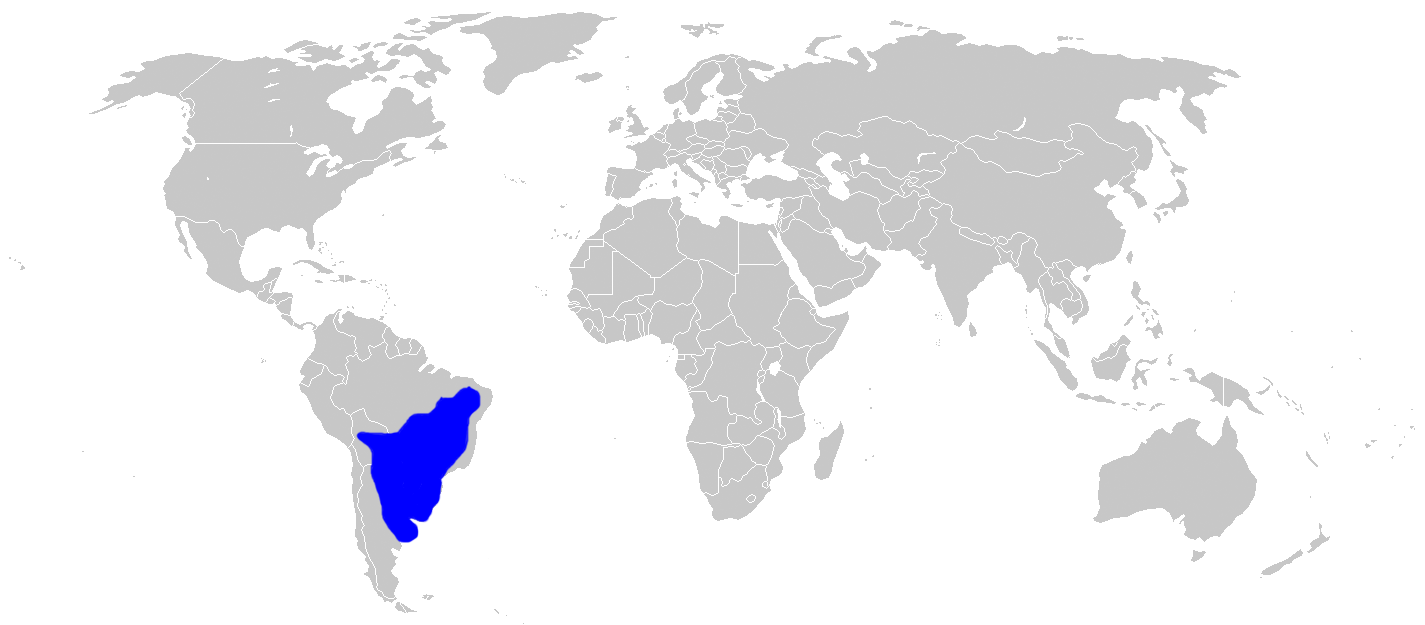
- Estimated range of Patagioenas picazuro in blue.

= Picazuro pigeon =

Species of bird

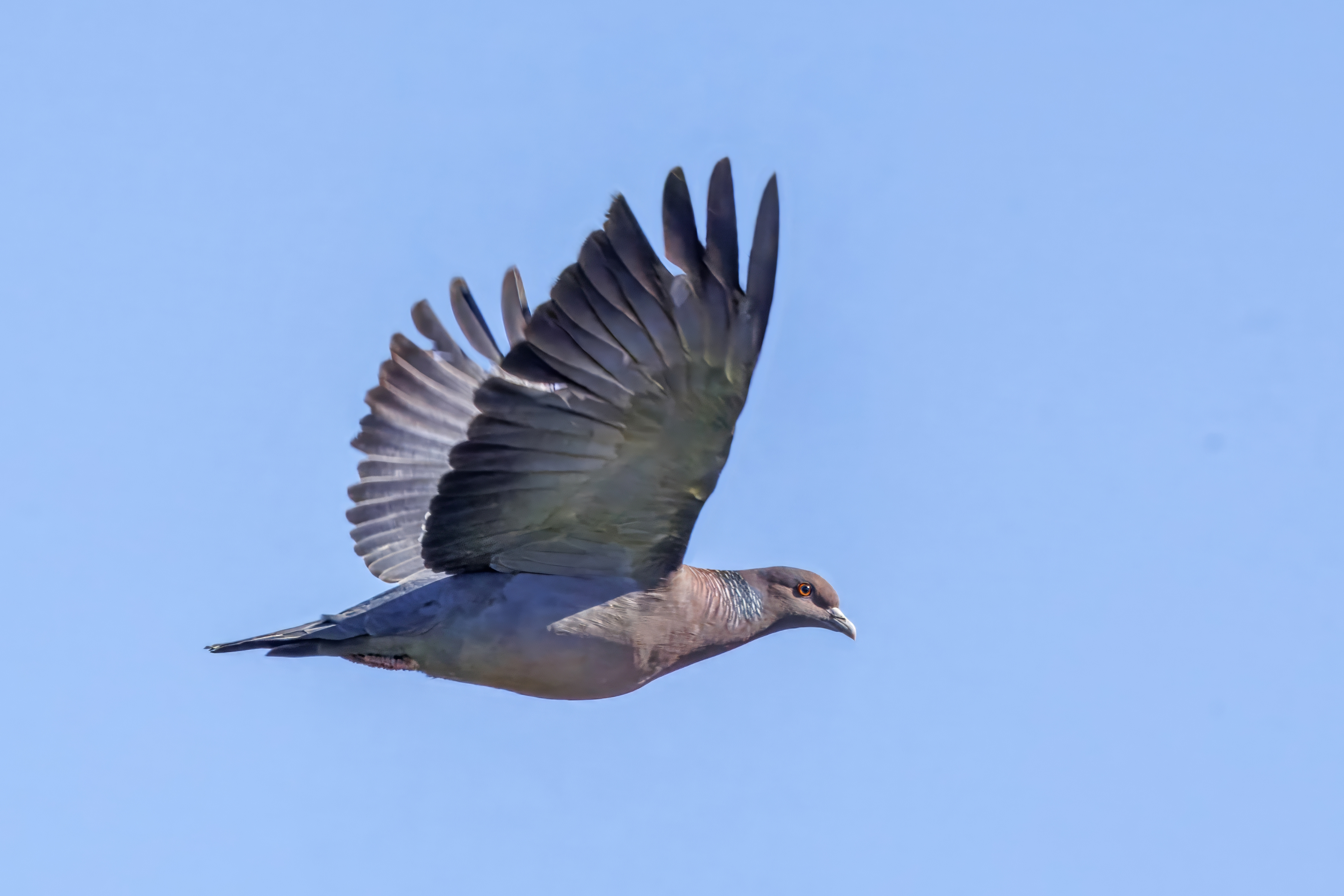
in Colonia del Sacramento, Uruguay

The picazuro pigeon (Patagioenas picazuro) is a pigeon native to South America.

== Description ==
It is a large pigeon with a wingspan of up to 22 inches and can weigh as much as a pound. It is a brown bird with white dashes on the back of its neck and darker brown wing patterns. It is similar in appearance to the spotted dove.

== Distribution ==
The picazuro pigeon is found in Argentina, Bolivia, Brazil, Paraguay and Uruguay. It has an estimated global extent of occurrence of 5,800,000 km^{2} and although an accurate population count has not taken place, it is believed that the species is common and the population is thought to be increasing. Picazuro pigeons survive in a variety of habitats; from woodland and forest to agricultural land.

== Diet ==
This species feeds mainly on the ground and like most other pigeons eats seeds and grain.

== Reproduction ==
Picazuro pigeons nest in every month of the year. A fragile nest is built from sticks and one egg is laid. Both parents incubate the egg. Once the egg has hatched, the chick is fed on crop milk and then regurgitated seeds.
