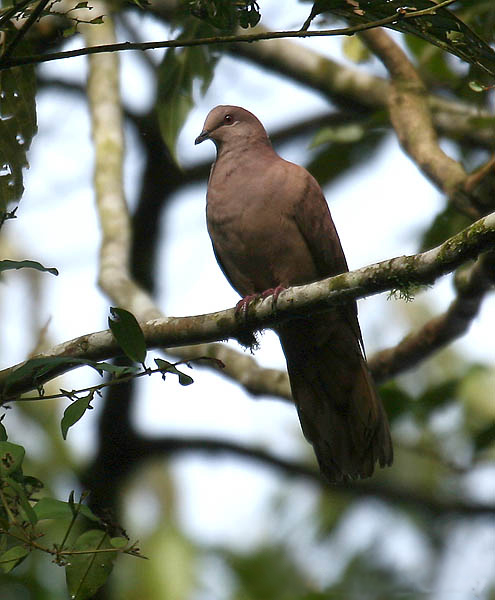
- At Milpe Bird Sanctuary (NW Ecuador)

Conservation status
- Least Concern (IUCN 3.1)

Scientific classification
- Kingdom: Animalia
- Phylum: Chordata
- Class: Aves
- Order: Columbiformes
- Family: Columbidae
- Genus: Patagioenas
- Species: P. subvinacea

Binomial name
- Patagioenas subvinacea (Lawrence, 1868)

Synonyms
- Chloroenas subvinacea Lawrence, 1868; Columba subvinacea (Lawrence, 1868)

Audio

= Ruddy pigeon =

Species of bird

The ruddy pigeon (Patagioenas subvinacea) is a largish pigeon which breeds from Costa Rica south to western Ecuador, Bolivia, and central Brazil. It belongs to a clade of small and rather plain species of Patagioenas with characteristic calls that constitute the subgenus Oenoenas. Like the other New World pigeons, it was formerly united with their Old World relatives in Columba, but today the New World genus Patagioenas is recognized as distinct again.

The ruddy pigeon is 28 cm (11 in) long and weighs 170 g. It is unpatterned and mainly wine-purple in colour, becoming more rufous on the back. The tail and primary flight feathers are dark brown, the bill is black, and the legs are purple-red. The iris is typically red, but can, at least in the Amazon basin, sometimes be dull yellow (however, due to the red eye-ring, the iris never appears as conspicuously white as in adults of the sympatric subspecies of the plumbeous pigeon, P. plumbea). The female is slightly duller and browner than the male, and the juvenile bird has a greyish brown head, neck and breast, with cinnamon or rufous scaling on the head and upperparts.

It has a loud and fairly high-pitched coo, ko'COO coo call, with considerable pauses between calls just as in its relatives. There are some geographical variations in its voice, with some populations singing four-noted songs, while others sing three-noted songs.

In Central America, the ruddy pigeon is replaced at lower altitudes by its close relative, the very similar short-billed pigeon (P. nigrirostris). The two species are best separated by call, which is faster and less complex in P. subvinacea.

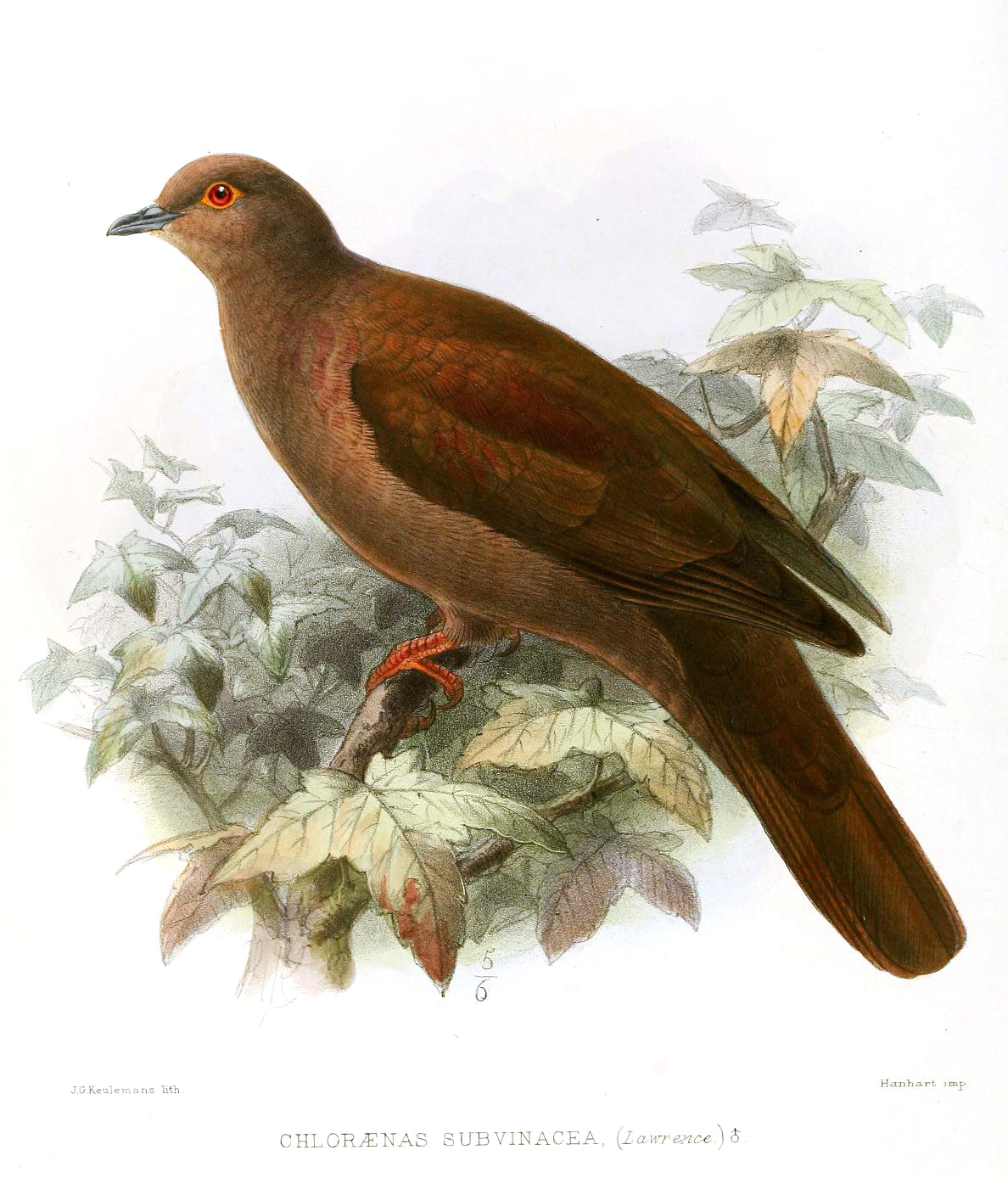

In Central America it is found in highland forest canopy and semi-open woodland from 1500 m (5000 ft) ASL to the timberline. In South America it occurs in the canopy of humid forest from near sea-level to 1500 m (5000 ft) ASL, occasionally higher; exceptionally, they may range up to 3000 m ASL or more. It is not uncommon across its wide range but due to projected deforestation is thus classified as a Least Concern species by the IUCN. It is normally seen in pairs as it forages in the tree tops for fruits and berries—being particularly fond of mistletoe fruit – but may occasionally be seen on tracks and roadside seeking grit. It builds a rudimentary platform nest out of twigs 5 m high in a small tree, and lays one white egg.
