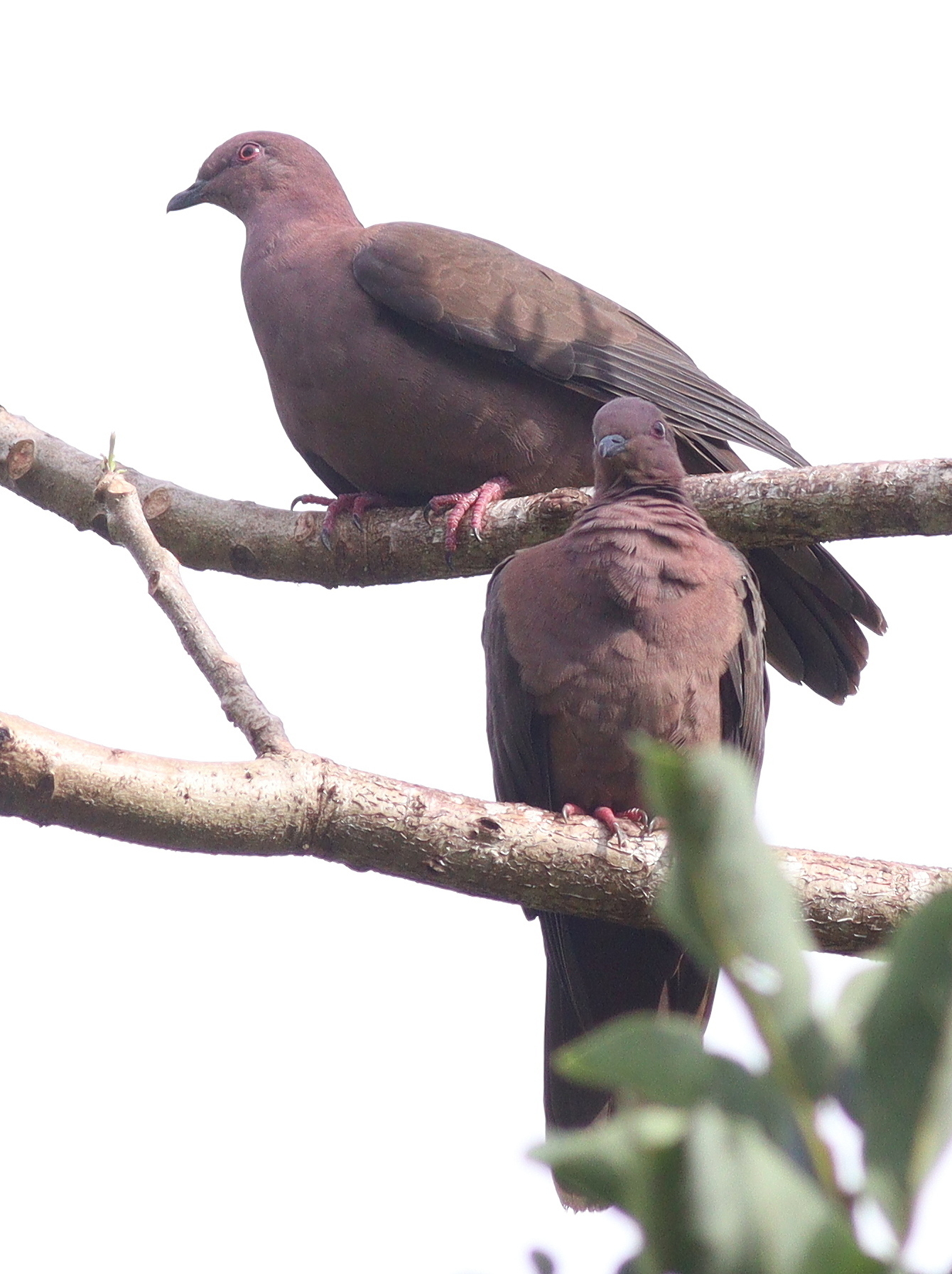

Conservation status
- Least Concern (IUCN 3.1)

Scientific classification
- Kingdom: Animalia
- Phylum: Chordata
- Class: Aves
- Order: Columbiformes
- Family: Columbidae
- Genus: Patagioenas
- Species: P. nigrirostris

Binomial name
- Patagioenas nigrirostris (Sclater, PL, 1860)

Synonyms
- Columba nigrirostris (protonym)

= Short-billed pigeon =

Species of bird

The short-billed pigeon (Patagioenas nigrirostris) is a largish pigeon which breeds from southern Mexico south to northwestern Colombia. It is a member of a clade of Patagioenas that contains the smaller and rather plain species with characteristic calls that constitute the subgenus Oenoenas.

It is found in lowland forest canopy and semi-open woodland, and builds a rudimentary platform nest out of twigs 5–30 m (16–98 ft) high in a tree or amongst vines. It lays one white egg.

The short-billed pigeon is 26.5 cm (10.4 in) long and weighs 150 g (5.3 oz). It is unpatterned and mainly wine-purple in colour, becoming browner on the belly and more olive-brown on the back. The tail and primary flight feathers are blackish, the bill is black, and the legs and eyes are purple-red. The female is slightly duller and browner than the male, and the juvenile bird has a greyish brown head, neck and breast, with cinnamon scaling on the head and upperparts.

The short-billed pigeon has a complex, loud and high-pitched call coo... cu-COO k’CO coohoo; this is usually uttered singly or at least with considerable pauses between calls. It is normally sighted in pairs as it forages in the tree tops for mistletoe, fruits and berries, but may also be seen on tracks and roadsides seeking grit or small invertebrates.

In southern Central America, this species is replaced at higher altitudes by its close relative, the very similar ruddy pigeon, Patagioenas subvinacea. They can be distinguished by the slower, more complex "song" of the short-billed pigeon.
