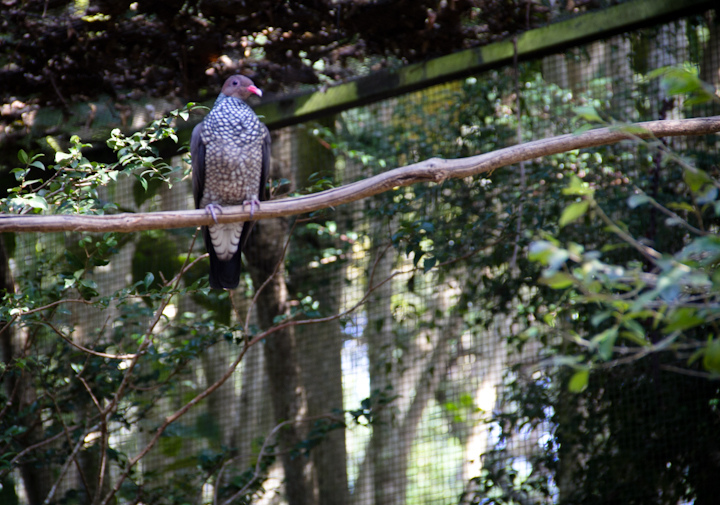
- At Zooparque Itatiba, Sao Paulo State, Brazil

Conservation status
- Least Concern (IUCN 3.1)

Scientific classification
- Kingdom: Animalia
- Phylum: Chordata
- Class: Aves
- Order: Columbiformes
- Family: Columbidae
- Genus: Patagioenas
- Species: P. speciosa

Binomial name
- Patagioenas speciosa (Gmelin, JF, 1789)

Synonyms
- Columba speciosa Gmelin, 1789

= Scaled pigeon =

Species of bird

The scaled pigeon (Patagioenas speciosa) is a large New World tropical dove. It is a resident breeder from southern Mexico south to western Ecuador, southern Brazil, northern Argentina, and Trinidad.

The scaled pigeon is fairly common in semi-open forest. It builds a stick platform nest in a tree and lays two white eggs.

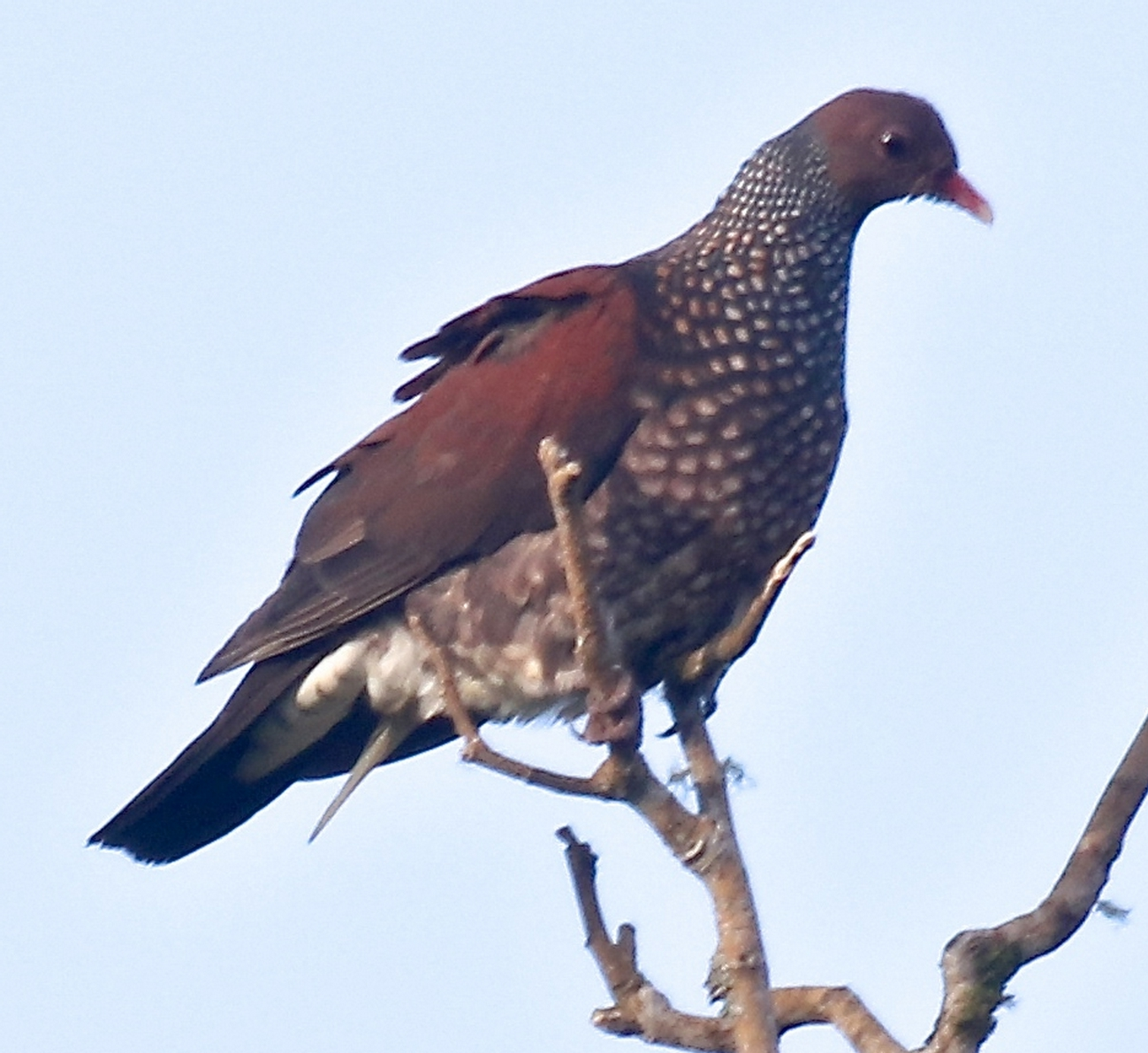
Wildsumaco Lodge - Ecuador

Its flight is high, fast and direct, with the regular beats and an occasional sharp flick of the wings which are characteristic of pigeons in general. It is usually very wary, since it is frequently hunted.

== Taxonomy ==
The scaled pigeon was formally described in 1789 by the German naturalist Johann Friedrich Gmelin in his revised and expanded edition of Carl Linnaeus's Systema Naturae. He placed it with all the other doves and pigeons in the genus Columba and coined the binomial name Columba speciosa. Gmelin based his description on "Le Ramiret" and the "Pigeon ramier de Cayenne" that had been described and illustrated in 1871 by the French polymath Georges-Louis Leclerc, Comte de Buffon. The scaled pigeon was moved to the resurrected genus Patagioenas based on a molecular phylogenetic study published in 2001. The genus had been introduced by the German naturalist Ludwig Reichenbach in 1853. The genus name combines the Ancient Greek patageō meaning "to clatter" and oinas meaning "pigeon". The specific epithet speciosa is from Latin speciosus meaning "beautiful". The species in monotypic: no subspecies are recognised.

== Description ==
The scaled pigeon is 36 cm (14 in) long and weighs normally about 290 g (10 oz). Adult males have mainly purple brown plumage, with a paler scaly appearance to the neck and underparts. The lower underparts are whitish edged with purple. The eyering, legs and bill are red, the latter having a white tip. The female is dull dark brown rather than purplish, and is slightly smaller than the male.

Scaled pigeons feed mainly on forest fruits and seeds. Birds have also been seen to feed on fresh green leaves and sometimes crops. The call is a series of deep cooing cro ku-ks that differs markedly from that of its relatives, such as the white-crowned pigeon. This is a solitary bird which does not form flocks.

The scaled pigeon has been recorded as successfully nesting on a fern (Pteridium aquilinum at ground level, and in the canopy of the tree fern Cyathea cyatheoides). The pearl kite visits nests of this species as a natural predator.
