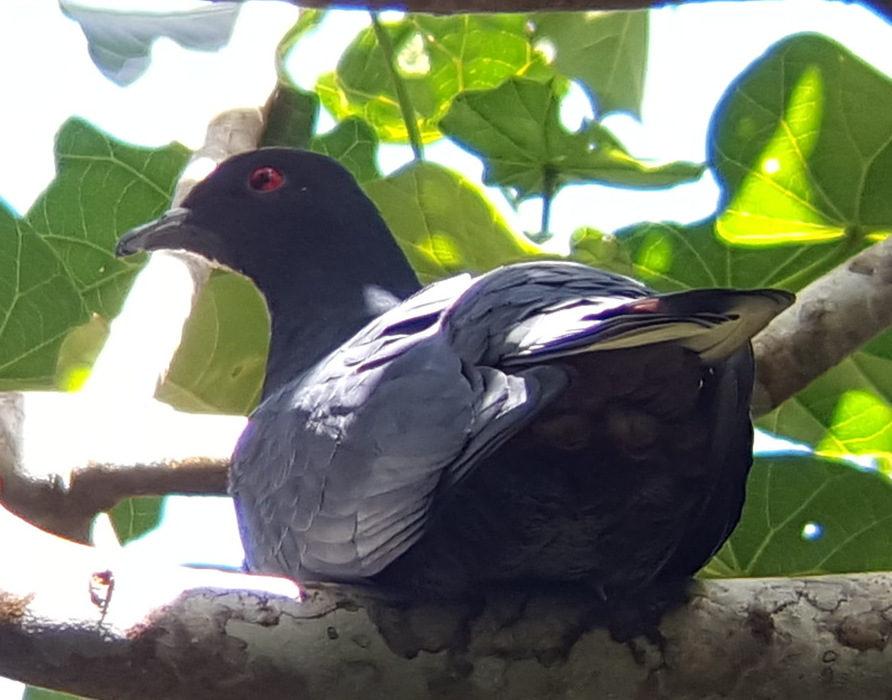

Conservation status
- Least Concern (IUCN 3.1)

Scientific classification
- Kingdom: Animalia
- Phylum: Chordata
- Class: Aves
- Order: Columbiformes
- Family: Columbidae
- Genus: Ducula
- Species: D. melanochroa

Binomial name
- Ducula melanochroa (Sclater, PL, 1878)

Synonyms
- Carpophaga melanochroa Sclater, P. L., 1878; Zonoenas melanochroa (Sclater, P. L., 1878)

= Black imperial pigeon =

Species of bird

The black imperial pigeon (Ducula melanochroa), also known as the Bismarck imperial pigeon, is a species of bird in the pigeon family, Columbidae. First described by English zoologist Philip Sclater in 1878, it is endemic to the Bismarck Archipelago, where it mainly inhabits rainforest and cloud forest in mountain areas above 500 m (1,600 ft). It is a large, heavily built imperial pigeon, with a length of 38–43 cm (15–17 in) and a weight of 661–665 g (23.3–23.5 oz). Adults are almost entirely black, except for the dark chestnut undertail coverts, the silvery-grey underside of the tail, and a pale grey scaly pattern on the wings and back. Both sexes look alike. Juveniles differ from adults in having paler undertail coverts.

The species feeds on fruit in the canopy, usually alone or in small flocks of up to 20 birds, though flocks of up to 40 birds have been found on fig trees. The only known nest was found on a mossy tree in January 1994 and had a single white egg. The pigeon is generally common in mountainous regions and is listed as being of least concern on the IUCN Red List due to its sufficiently large range and lack of sufficient decline in its populations.

== Taxonomy and systematics ==
The black imperial pigeon was originally described as Carpophaga melanochroa by the English zoologist Philip Sclater in 1878 based on specimens from the Duke of York Islands. By 1925, it had been moved to its current genus, Ducula. The generic name Ducula is from "dukul", the Nepali name for imperial pigeons. The specific name melanochroa is from the Ancient Greek word melanokhrōs, meaning black-skinned. Black imperial pigeon is the official common name designated by the International Ornithologists' Union. Other common names for the species include Bismarck imperial pigeon and silver-laced imperial pigeon.

The black imperial pigeon is one of over 40 species in the imperial pigeon genus Ducula in the pigeon family Columbidae. It has no subspecies. It was previously placed in a species group with the Pinon's, Louisiade, and collared imperial pigeons. These four species were further thought to be most closely related to a group formed by the barking, chestnut-bellied, Vanuatu and goliath imperial pigeons. A 2017 study of mitochondrial and nuclear DNA found the black imperial pigeon to be most closely related to the Vanuatu imperial pigeon, and that these two species were part of a clade (group of all the descendants of a common ancestor) that also included the silver-tipped, pied, barking, chestnut-bellied, Vanuatu, goliath, Pinon's, and collared imperial pigeons.

== Description ==
The black imperial pigeon is a large, heavily built, long-tailed species for its genus, with a length of 38–43 cm (15–17 in) and a weight of 661–665 g (23.3–23.5 oz). It is almost entirely slaty-black, with a slight gloss to the feathers of the upper back and the scapulars. The wing coverts and feathers of the back have silver or pale grey fringes that make a scaled pattern. The undertail coverts (feathers between the tail and belly) are dark chestnut. The tail is pale black above, while the underside of the tail is silvery-grey. The bill is slaty-grey with a black tip and the cere is mostly lacks feathers, giving the forehead a steeper appearance than related species such as Pinon's imperial pigeon. The iris is dark red and the feet are dark purplish-red. Both sexes look alike. Juveniles are similar to adults, but have paler chestnut on the undertail coverts. Moulting is known to take place in November, December, and January.

In flight, immature Nicobar pigeons may be confused with this species due to their all-black appearance, but the former have longer wings, a shorter tail, and an overall longer appearance, with a thinner neck.

=== Vocalisations ===
The species is known to give three low-pitched booming notes, along with grunts and a hornbill-like arh. These vocalisations may be the same as calls described as deep hoots and "peculiar" grunts on Umboi. A very deep, monotonic mmmmmmmmmmmmmmm has also been reported from New Ireland.

== Distribution and habitat ==
The black imperial pigeon is endemic to the Bismarck Archipelago, where it is found on the islands of Umboi, New Britain, Watom, Duke of York, and New Ireland. It prefers rainforests and cloud forests above altitudes of 500 m (1,600 ft) in hills and mountains, but is also known to inhabit forest edge, partially logged forests, and lowland forest. It is found at elevations of 150–1,850 m (490–6,070 ft) on New Britain, from 300–700 m (980–2,300 ft) on Umboi, and from 700–1,800 m (2,300–5,900 ft) on New Ireland.

On New Britain, its abundance in the lowlands varies seasonally, suggesting that it migrates altitudinally. It is a vagrant on some small islands between New Ireland and New Britain, meaning that it may also migrate between the two islands.

== Behaviour and ecology ==
The black imperial pigeon is frugivorous and has been observed feeding on fruit with diameters between 15–35 mm (0.59–1.38 in) and wild figs. Foraging occurs in the canopy and is most often done alone or in small flocks of up to 20 birds, although flocks with as many as 40 birds may be seen on Ficus trees. It is known to form flocks with white-bibbed fruit doves while foraging.

The only known black imperial pigeon nest was found in January 1994, at an elevation of 1,760 m (5,770 ft) on New Ireland, and had a diameter of 23 cm (9.1 in). It was made entirely out of twigs, with no material lining the surface, and was placed at a height of around 4 m (13 ft) between two branches on a mossy tree. It had a single white egg.

== Status ==
The black imperial pigeon is listed as being of least concern by the International Union for Conservation of Nature (IUCN) on the IUCN Red List due to a sufficiently large range and lack of sufficient population decline. It is thought to be common on New Britain, with an estimated population of more than 10,000 birds, and is generally common locally in mountainous regions. Although it has shown an ability to tolerate selective logging in forests on New Ireland, its population is thought to currently be declining due to habitat destruction.
