= White-eyed imperial pigeon =

The white-eyed imperial pigeon has been split into two species:

- Spectacled imperial pigeon, Ducula perspicillata
- Seram imperial pigeon, Ducula neglecta
