= Louisiade imperial pigeon =

Conservation status
- Least Concern (IUCN 3.1)

Scientific classification
- Kingdom: Animalia
- Phylum: Chordata
- Class: Aves
- Order: Columbiformes
- Family: Columbidae
- Genus: Ducula
- Species: D. salvadorii

Binomial name
- Ducula salvadorii (Tristram, 1881)

Species of bird

The Louisiade imperial pigeon (Ducula salvadorii) is a species of bird in the family Columbidae found in Milne Bay Province in Papua New Guinea. It is found on Goodenough and Fergusson islands in the D'Entrecasteaux Islands and Misima, Tagula and Rossel islands in the Louisiade Islands. The species was previously considered conspecific with Pinon's imperial pigeon.
