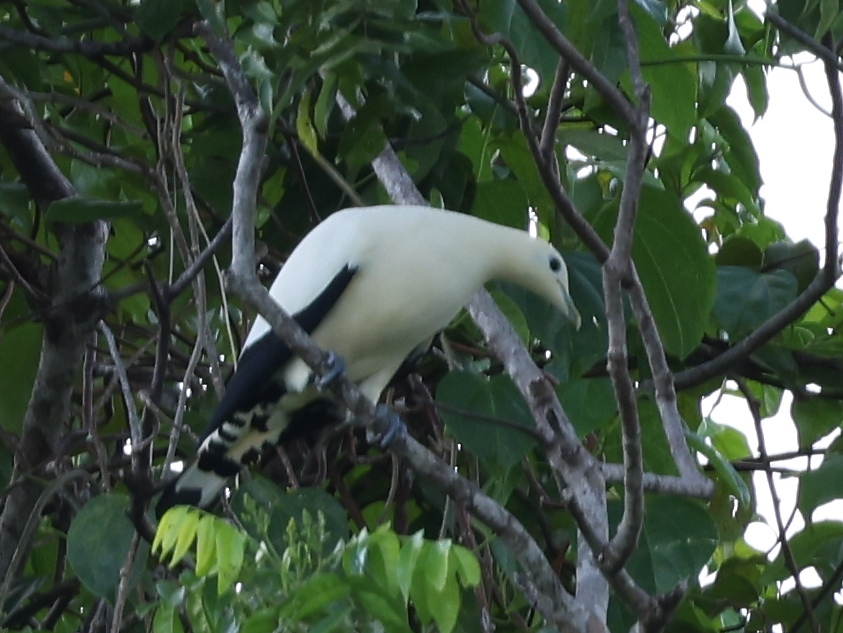

Conservation status
- Near Threatened (IUCN 3.1)

Scientific classification
- Kingdom: Animalia
- Phylum: Chordata
- Class: Aves
- Order: Columbiformes
- Family: Columbidae
- Genus: Ducula
- Species: D. subflavescens

Binomial name
- Ducula subflavescens (Finsch, 1886)

= Yellowish imperial pigeon =

Species of bird

The yellowish imperial pigeon (Ducula subflavescens), also known as the yellow-tinted imperial pigeon or Bismarck imperial pigeon (leading to easy confusion with D. melanochroa), is a relatively large species of bird in the family Columbidae. It is endemic to forest and woodland in the Bismarck Archipelago. It is threatened by habitat loss.

It is often considered a subspecies of the Torresian imperial pigeon (which in turn sometimes is considered a subspecies of the pied imperial pigeon), but is increasingly treated as a separate species. It resembles the Torresian imperial pigeon, but has a distinctly yellow-tinged plumage and a bluish base to the bill.
