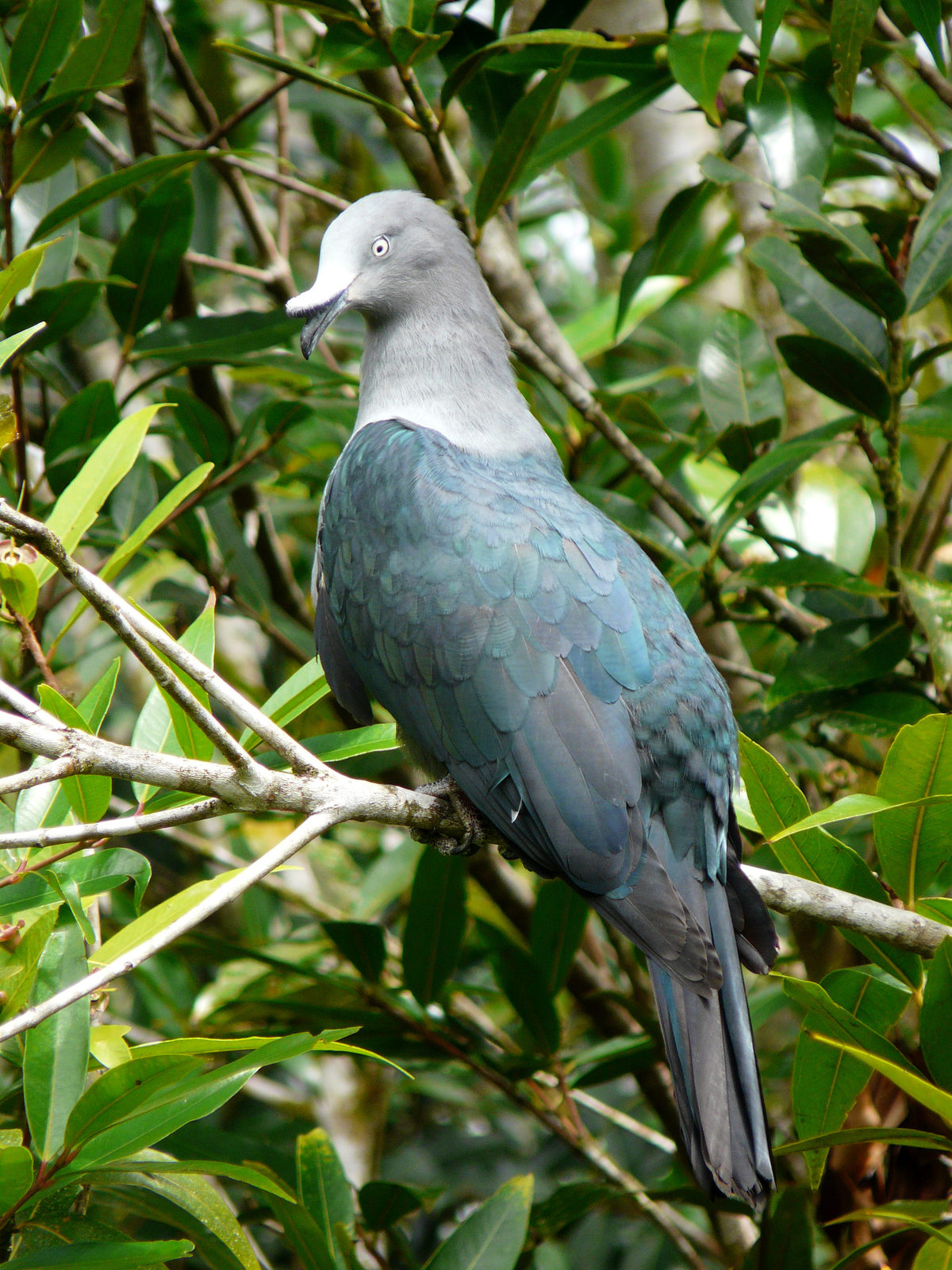

Conservation status
- Endangered (IUCN 3.1)

Scientific classification
- Kingdom: Animalia
- Phylum: Chordata
- Class: Aves
- Order: Columbiformes
- Family: Columbidae
- Genus: Ducula
- Species: D. galeata

Binomial name
- Ducula galeata (Bonaparte, 1855)

= Nuku Hiva imperial pigeon =

Species of bird

The Nuku Hiva imperial pigeon (Ducula galeata), also known as the Marquesan imperial pigeon or Upe, is a pigeon which is endemic to Nuku Hiva in the Marquesas Islands of French Polynesia, now restricted to some valleys in the western part of that island; following successful reintroductions of birds in 2000 and 2003, there is now an established population on Ua Huka. With its small distribution, scientists now believe it has probably never been common, but its small population (estimated at c. 300 as of 2023) has marked it as an endangered species since 2008.

== Description ==
This is the largest pigeon outside of the crowned pigeons, (Note: Individuals in the four species of crowned pigeons have reached as extreme as 80 cm (31 in) and 3.5 kg (7.7 lb)) as it weighs approximately 900 g (2.0 lb). Females, at 50 to 53.5 cm (19.7 to 21.1 in) long, are slightly smaller than males, at 55 cm (22 in) in length. Among standard measurements, the wing chord is 27.8–32.1 cm (10.9–12.6 in), the tail is 18.1–23.1 cm (7.1–9.1 in), the bill is 1.9–2.7 cm (0.75–1.06 in) and the tarsus is 3.9–4.6 cm (1.5–1.8 in). This species is heavily built with a large bill and long, broad tail. The wings are broad and rounded in shape.

The Nuku Hiva imperial pigeon is sooty-gray on the head, throat and breast, with a white band just behind the bill that can be seen from some distance. The belly is slightly browner in color than the rest of the underside. The upperparts, wings and tail are glossy green with a bluish tint. The underside of both the tail and the wings are black. The bill is black, with a swollen cere that gives the face a unique sloping look just above the bill.

This bird has an cooing advertising call that consist of a loud, deep, guttural 'neah-ah, neah-ah, neah-ah, neah-ah or naw-aw, naw-naw or uh-wah, uh-wah, uh-wah. This call is so deep in timber that it is sometimes described as cow-like. A call, probably consisting of an excitement call, has been described as a crow-like krawk, krawk.

== Habitat ==
This was originally distributed throughout its native island, which at one time was almost completely covered in forest. Now it is basically restricted to woodland from 200 to 1,500 m (660 to 4,920 ft) above sea-level. A few on the island may still turn in sea-level forested groves and woods surrounded banana and orange plantations. Before ancient Polynesian settlers arrived there, subfossil bones show there was also a population of this bird on Henderson Island in the Pitcairn Islands.

== Biology ==
The Nuku Hiva imperial pigeon is normally seen singly or in pairs, often while perched around a fruiting tree. The species is not noticeably shy and may allow fairly close approach while feeding. It favors fruit of up to 5 cm (2.0 in). Favored foods including Mangifera indica (a mango), Psidium guajava (a guava) and numerous smaller fruit of the genera Ficus, Cordia and Eugenia. It often spends much of the day perched in tree canopies, often on or near cliffs. It flies to new foraging sites over forested ridges with deep, labored wing beats. While gliding it may fly with wings held quite far back and when descending to land below, it holds its wings along flat against its body.

Nests have been observed in May, July, September and October, indicating that nesting may occur nearly year-around, or that breeding activities peak around the middle of the year. The parents build a flat structure of stick on a branch at mid-height, at 13 to 20 m (43 to 66 ft) or rarely as low as 5 m (16 ft), in a forest tree. A single glossy white egg is laid. No further information is known of the species breeding habits.

== Status ==
Formerly (1996–2004 quadrennial reports) classified by the IUCN as a critically endangered species with an estimated population of less than 150 adult birds, it was suspected to be more numerous than generally assumed. Following an evaluation of its population status, completed in 2008, found an estimated 150 to 300 birds in total on the island, it was downlisted to endangered; the 2008 IUCN report noted that it was still an exceedingly rare bird, but successful conservation measures had averted the threat of immediate extinction. It was probably never common. Some authorities have claimed that the species once existed on other Marquesan islands, including Cook Islands, Society Islands and Pitcairn Islands. However, most now agree that these extinct forms were probably other species in the genus Ducula. The species has been greatly depleted by habitat degradation.

The 2023 IUCN report assessed the population as having increased marginally, with numbers approaching 250 mature individuals in a total population estimated at 300 individuals.
