= Rufescent imperial pigeon =

- In Papua New Guinea
- In Indonesia

Conservation status
- Least Concern (IUCN 3.1)

Scientific classification
- Kingdom: Animalia
- Phylum: Chordata
- Class: Aves
- Order: Columbiformes
- Family: Columbidae
- Genus: Ducula
- Species: D. chalconota

Binomial name
- Ducula chalconota (Salvadori, 1874)

Species of bird

The Rufescent Imperial Pigeon (Ducula chalconota), also known as the Shining Imperial Pigeon, is a rare species in the world of birds. According to The International Union for Conservative, this species is relatively unknown, and their concern is very minimal. The Union describes that this species is very stable and does not encounter threats from other species The trait of stability is vital in differentiating The Rufescent Imperial Pigeon from the other species confronting threats. This bird in specific does not frequently encounter threats because they are more reserved, quiet birds that tend to remain alone in their habitat. The habitat of these birds allows them to have the frequency of being independent but also gives them the chance to be with other birds. Rooting from the bird family in Columbidae, that also consists of pigeons and doves. In which this family is known for being frugivorous, meaning it primarily feeds on fruit, figs, and seeds.

== Taxonomy ==
This species was described by Tommaso Salvadori as Carpophaga chalconota in 1874. Two subspecies are recognised: Ducula chalconota chalconota found in Vogelkop and D. c. smaragdina found in western, central and eastern New Guinea. A distinct population in the Foja Mountains has been reported.

== Description ==
To compare, the Male Rufescent Imperial Pigeon is about 41 to 42 centimeters or about 16 to 17 inches in length. In contrast, females are smaller, about 37 to 39 centimeters or 15 inches long, and can be distinguished by slight color differences. Both weigh around 21-22 ounces. Rufescent Imperial Pigeons, both male and female, are larger than most of the other pigeon species. In the subspecies smaragdina, the head is slaty-grey. The back and wing coverts are metallic green, with bronzy and bluish reflections, and the flight feathers are darker and more bluish. The tail is blackish and has a blue gloss. The throat is cinnamon, and the breast is vinous. The belly and flanks are chestnut. The feet are red, the eye is reddish, and the beak is dark slate. The female is very similar to the male. The juvenile bird has a paler head and neck, and its breast is vaguely greyish. The subspecies chalconota has a reddish-purple iridescence on its mantle and back.

== Distribution and habitat ==
The Rufescent Imperial Pigeon can be found in the deeper layers of the Montane Forest in New Guinea. The forest environment is the habitat to this pigeon's lifestyle because it allows Rufescent Imperial Pigeons to be at a high elevation level of 3,600 feet tall to around 8,200 feet high. Compared to other members of the Columbidae family, this elevation is high to be a habitat. Male and female Rufescent Imperial Pigeons can be found in these forests, primarily single, but sometimes they can be found in pairs (inaturalist).

== Behaviour ==
It often sits in the middle layers of the forest, and it does not leave the forest. Usually silent, it hums slowly and mournfully and also gives a low hoo and a hollow knock. Duetting has been observed. It eats figs and fruits. The breeding is unknown except that individuals in breeding condition have been collected in February and March.

Determining a Rufescent Imperial Pigeon is mainly done through visuals rather than vocals. This bird does not vocally express itself frequently, but when alarmed a hollow knock sound will echo through the forest. This hollow knock is known to sound like a slurred "woo". Coloring, though, is a more simplistic way to determine a rufescent imperial pigeon. Their chest is a pale-orange color that leads to a deep rufous belly and a black band in the tail. Females are distinguished by having a less reddish iridescence than males. Despite the fact that this bird is a pigeon, discovering a Rufescent Imperial Pigeon would be a very rare occurrence.

== Status ==
The population is stable and does not have substantial threats, so the IUCN has assessed it as a least-concern species.
