= Geelvink imperial pigeon =

Conservation status
- Least Concern (IUCN 3.1)

Scientific classification
- Kingdom: Animalia
- Phylum: Chordata
- Class: Aves
- Order: Columbiformes
- Family: Columbidae
- Genus: Ducula
- Species: D. geelvinkiana

Binomial name
- Ducula geelvinkiana (Schlegel, 1873)

Species of bird

The Geelvink imperial pigeon (Ducula geelvinkiana) is a species of bird in the family Columbidae. It is endemic to Indonesia's Schouten Islands (also known as the Geelvink Islands) and Mios Num Island, which lie north of New Guinea. Its natural habitats are tropical moist lowland forests and mangrove forests.

The Geelvink imperial pigeon was formerly considered conspecific with the spice imperial pigeon (Ducula myristicivora), but was recognized as a distinct species by the IOC in 2021.

It is threatened by hunting and habitat loss.

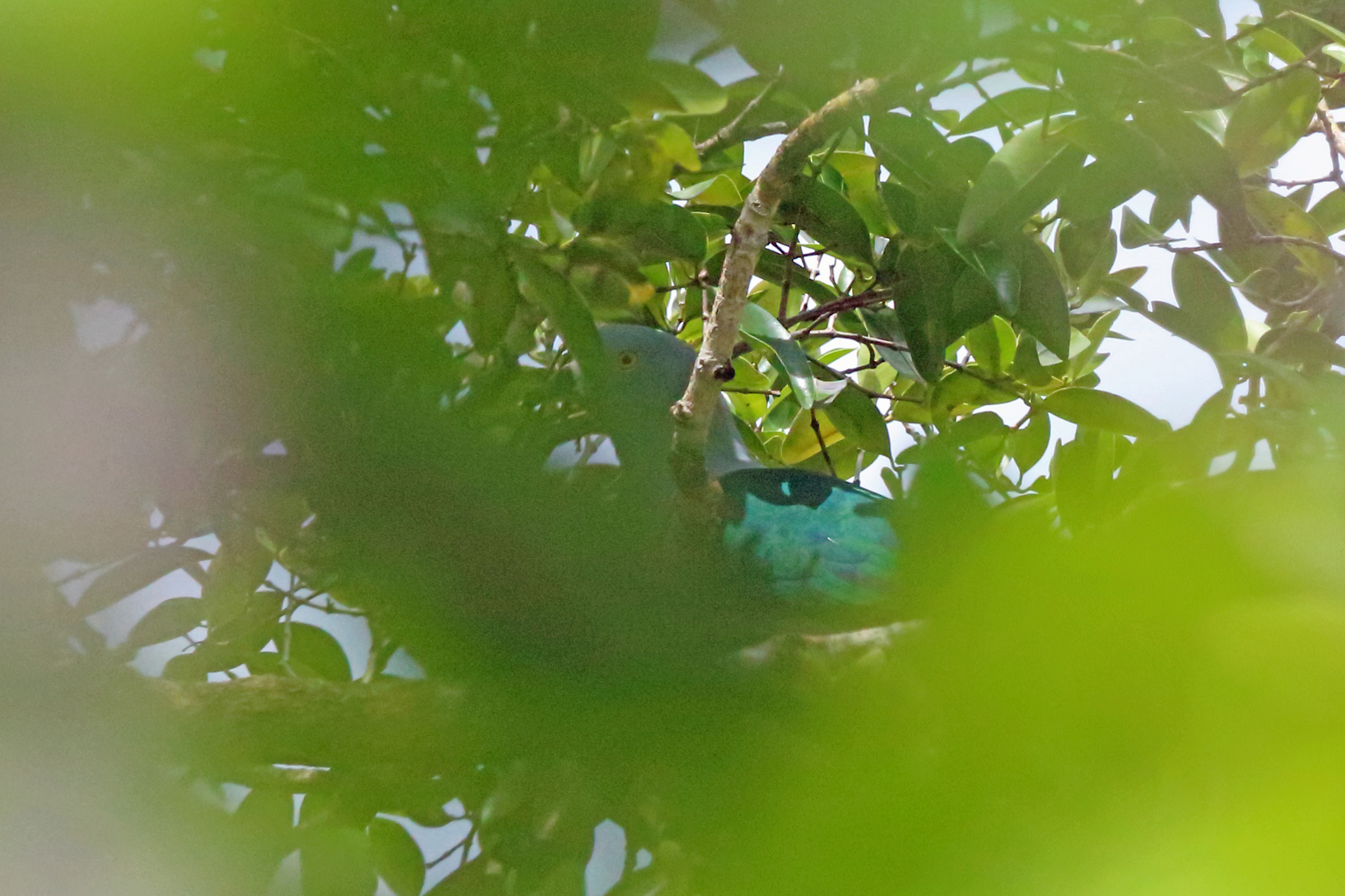
In tree canopy
