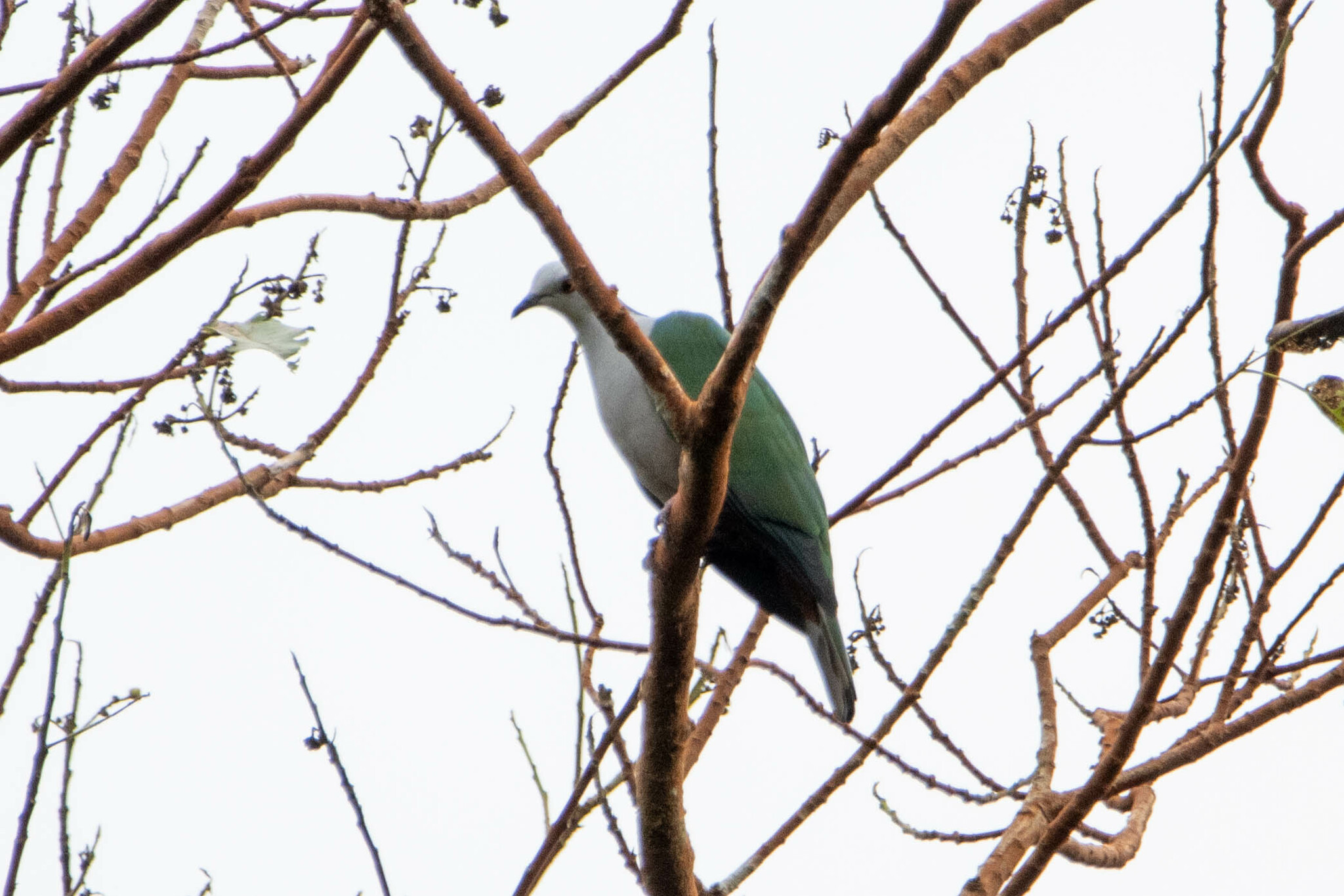

Conservation status
- Least Concern (IUCN 3.1)

Scientific classification
- Kingdom: Animalia
- Phylum: Chordata
- Class: Aves
- Order: Columbiformes
- Family: Columbidae
- Genus: Ducula
- Species: D. radiata

Binomial name
- Ducula radiata (Quoy & Gaimard, 1832)

= Grey-headed imperial pigeon =

Species of bird

The grey-headed imperial pigeon (Ducula radiata) is a species of bird in the family Columbidae. It is endemic to Sulawesi in Indonesia. Its natural habitats are subtropical or tropical moist lowland forests and subtropical or tropical moist montane forests.

== Description ==
The grey-headed imperial pigeon is a moderate-sized imperial pigeon with a long tail and a total length of about 38 cm (15 in). The head and underparts are grey and the hind neck is black, while the upper parts are metallic green, glossed on the mantle and scapulars with brownish-crimson. The tail is dark in colour with a narrow and inconspicuous band of pale grey near the base. The iris is orange, the beak is olive-green with a black tip or black all over, and the legs are purplish-red. The rather similar white-bellied imperial pigeon (Ducula forsteni) is larger and more heavily built, and has a broader band of grey on the tail; this is more centrally located and conspicuous.

== Distribution ==
The grey-headed imperial pigeon is endemic to the island of Sulawesi in Indonesia. It is mostly a bird of montane forests, generally found at altitudes of between 1,100 and 2,400 m (3,600 and 7,900 ft), but sometimes frequents the foothills at lower elevations. Its typical habitat is primary forests but it is also found in secondary growth forest and woodland edges.

== Ecology ==
The grey-headed imperial pigeon is most often seen in pairs or alone, but outside the breeding season may form small flocks of up to twenty birds. It has a fast, direct flight and can sometimes be seen flying high above the forest canopy. Like other imperial pigeons, it feeds on fruit which it picks from the branches of trees, scrambling about acrobatically in the canopy; it swallows the fruits whole and thus serves a role in the distribution of their seeds. Nests have been found in December and March, so the breeding season may be long. A single egg is laid in a cliff-ledge nest, in a hole in a tree or in a sheltered niche.

== Status ==
The grey-headed imperial pigeon is a somewhat uncommon bird but it has a widespread distribution and the population is thought to be stable, so the International Union for Conservation of Nature has assessed its conservation status as "least concern".
