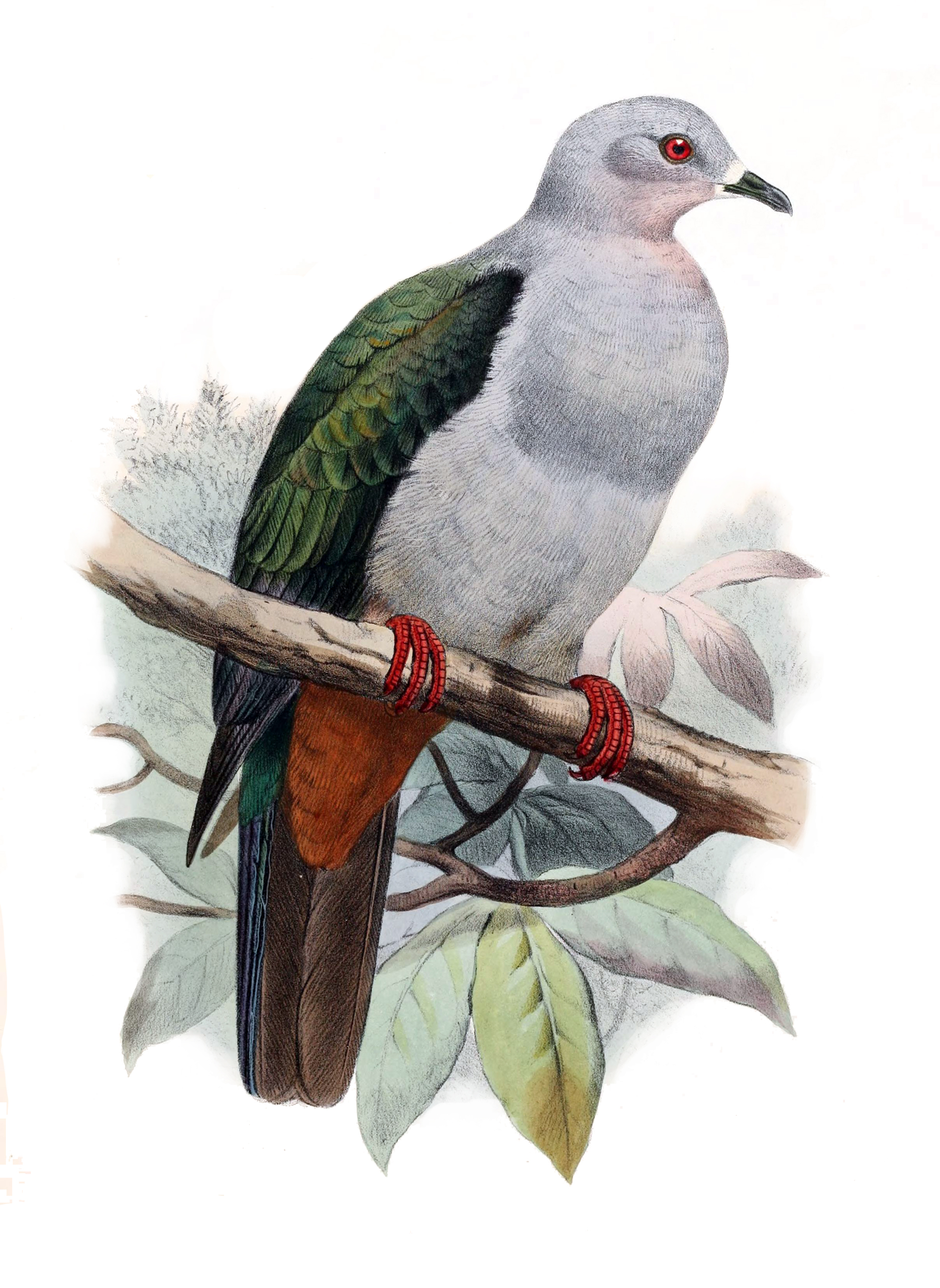

Conservation status
- Least Concern (IUCN 3.1)

Scientific classification
- Kingdom: Animalia
- Phylum: Chordata
- Class: Aves
- Order: Columbiformes
- Family: Columbidae
- Genus: Ducula
- Species: D. pistrinaria

Binomial name
- Ducula pistrinaria Bonaparte, 1855

= Island imperial pigeon =

Species of bird

The island imperial pigeon or floury imperial pigeon (Ducula pistrinaria) is a species of bird in the family Columbidae. It is found in the Bismarck Archipelago and the Solomon Islands archipelago, living in primary and secondary forests and mangroves. The International Union for Conservation of Nature (IUCN) has assessed it as a least-concern species.

== Taxonomy ==
This species was described by Charles Lucien Bonaparte in 1855. The following subspecies are recognised: Ducula pistrinaria rhodinolaema, D. p. vanwyckii, D. p. postrema and D. p. pistrinaria.

== Description ==
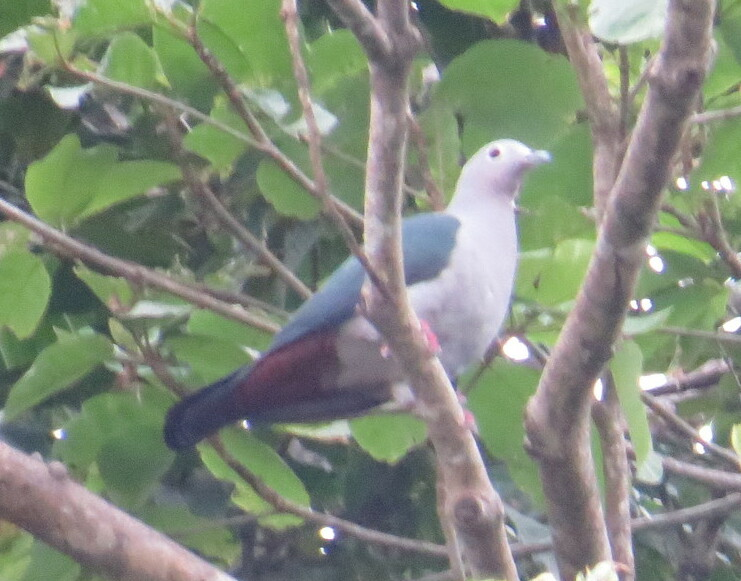
On New Britain

The island imperial pigeon is about 39–45 cm (15–18 in) long and weighs 470–500 g (17–18 oz). The head and neck are pale grey, and there are white spectacles. The upperparts are glossy. The wing coverts and tertials are grey-green, and the primaries and secondaries are blackish. The back is grey-green. The uppertail is dark blue-green, and the undertail is chestnut. The throat is vinous, the breast is greyish-vinous, and the belly is greyish-fawn. The beak is slaty-blue, having a black tip. The eye is dark red or brownish, and the feet are red. The juvenile bird is duller and buffier. The subspecies have different sizes and glosses.

== Distribution and habitat ==
This pigeon is found in the Bismarck Archipelago, the Solomon Islands archipelago and small islands to the north and east of New Guinea. Its habitat is coastal primary forest, old secondary forest, mangroves and some disturbed habitats.

== Behaviour ==
One or two birds and small flocks are usually found; large flocks are occasionally seen. The pigeon flies swiftly and directly. It plucks fruits from branches in the canopy, and it flies across the sea to search for food. Its calls include a rising and repeated c-wooooohooo given when the bird is upright, a loud series of descending coos while bobbing up and down, and a high-pitched crrrrrurrr. In display, it flies up at an angle of 70° and then glides. Breeding has been observed from June to September and in March. The nest is built at the end of a branch and made of twigs. One egg is laid.

== Status ==
The IUCN has assessed it as a least-concern species because of its large range and stable population.
