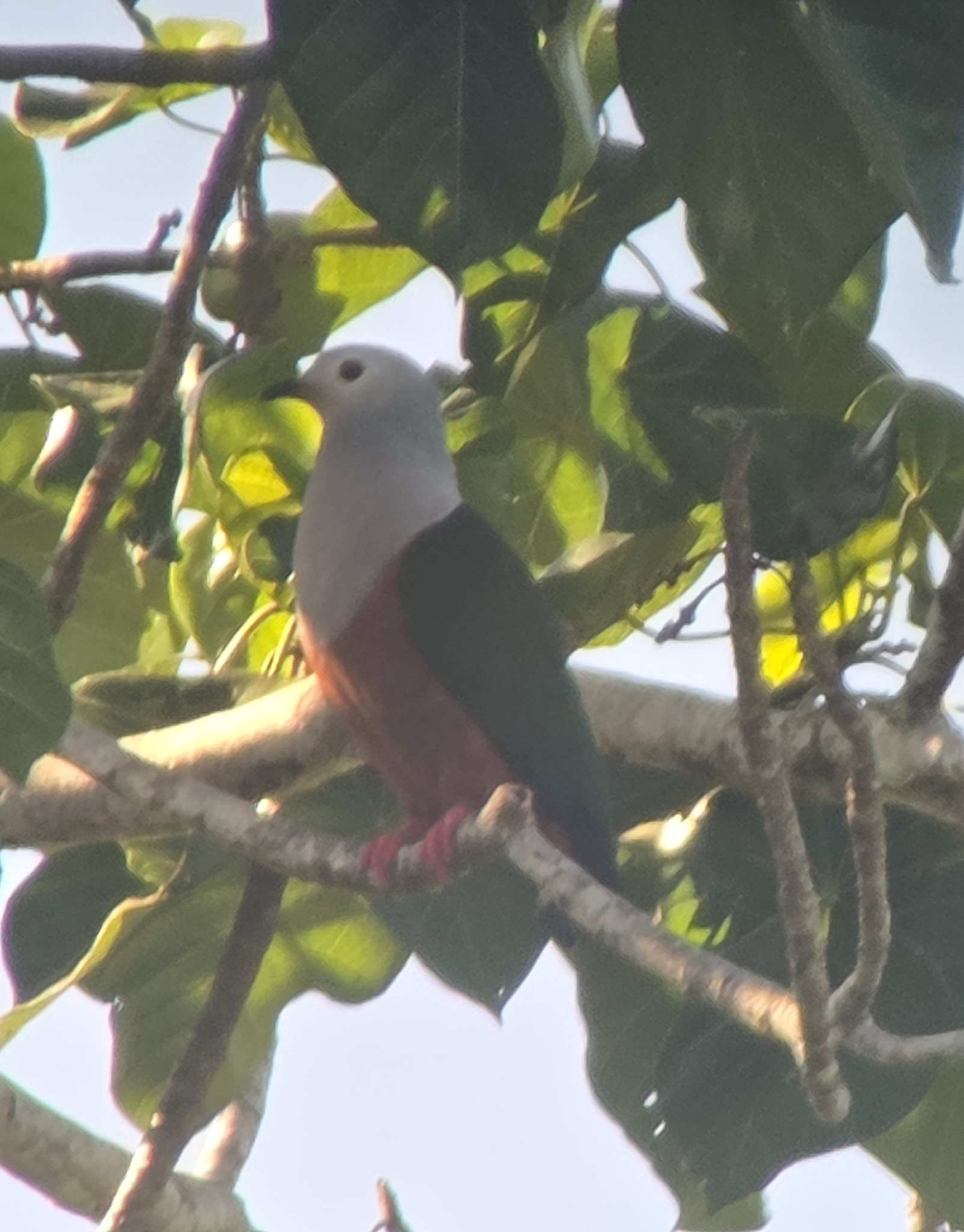

Conservation status
- Near Threatened (IUCN 3.1)

Scientific classification
- Kingdom: Animalia
- Phylum: Chordata
- Class: Aves
- Order: Columbiformes
- Family: Columbidae
- Genus: Ducula
- Species: D. finschii

Binomial name
- Ducula finschii (Ramsay, 1882)

= Finsch's imperial pigeon =

Species of bird

Finsch's imperial pigeon (Ducula finschii) or the growling imperial pigeon, is a bird species in the family Columbidae. It is endemic to Papua New Guinea. Its natural habitats are subtropical or tropical moist lowland forests and subtropical or tropical moist montane forests.

Formerly classified as a Species of least concern by the IUCN, it was suspected to be rarer than generally assumed. Following the evaluation of its population size, this was found to be correct, and it is consequently uplisted to near threatened status in 2008.
