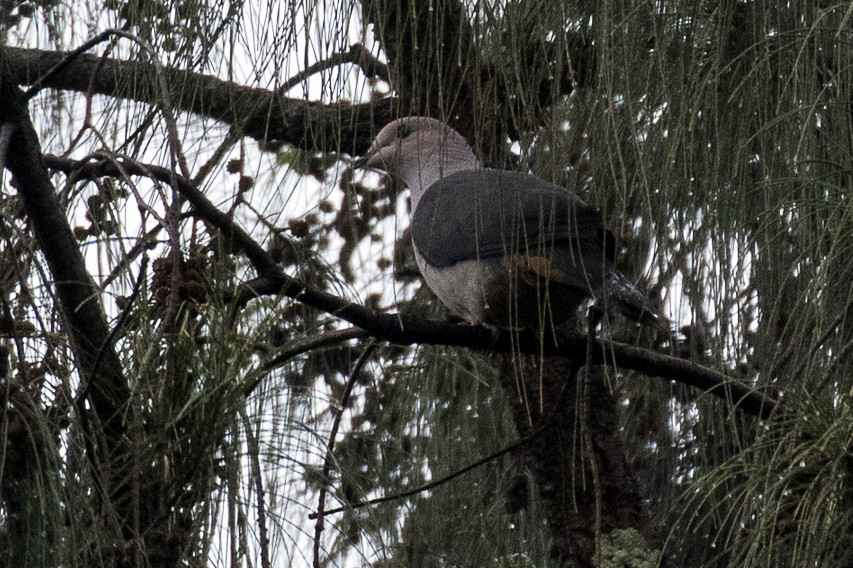

Conservation status
- Least Concern (IUCN 3.1)

Scientific classification
- Kingdom: Animalia
- Phylum: Chordata
- Class: Aves
- Order: Columbiformes
- Family: Columbidae
- Genus: Ducula
- Species: D. lacernulata

Binomial name
- Ducula lacernulata (Temminck, 1822)

= Dark-backed imperial pigeon =

Species of bird

The dark-backed imperial pigeon (Ducula lacernulata) is a species of bird in the family Columbidae. It is endemic to the Lesser Sunda Islands.

Its natural habitats are subtropical or tropical moist lowland forests and subtropical or tropical moist montane forests.
