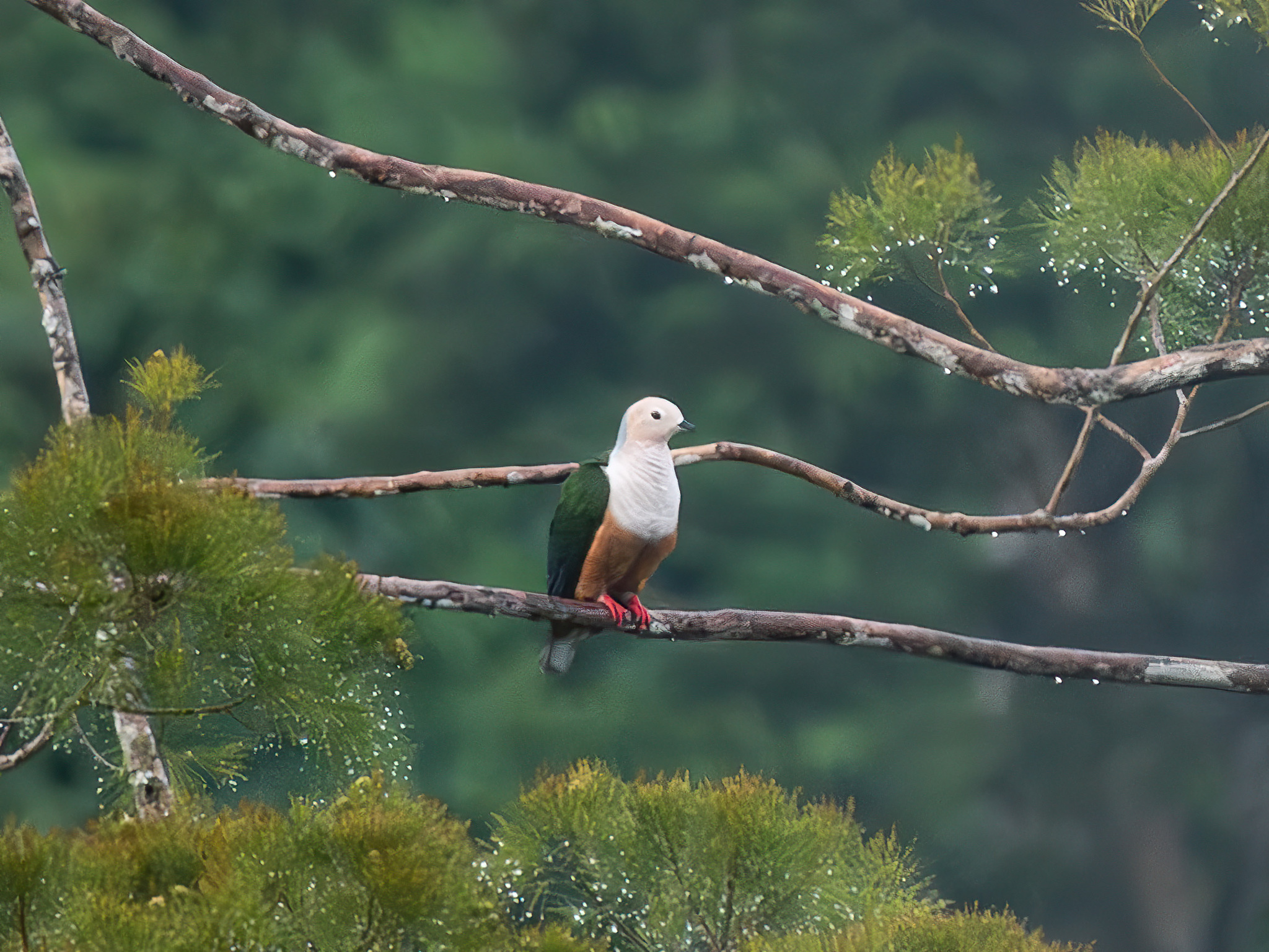

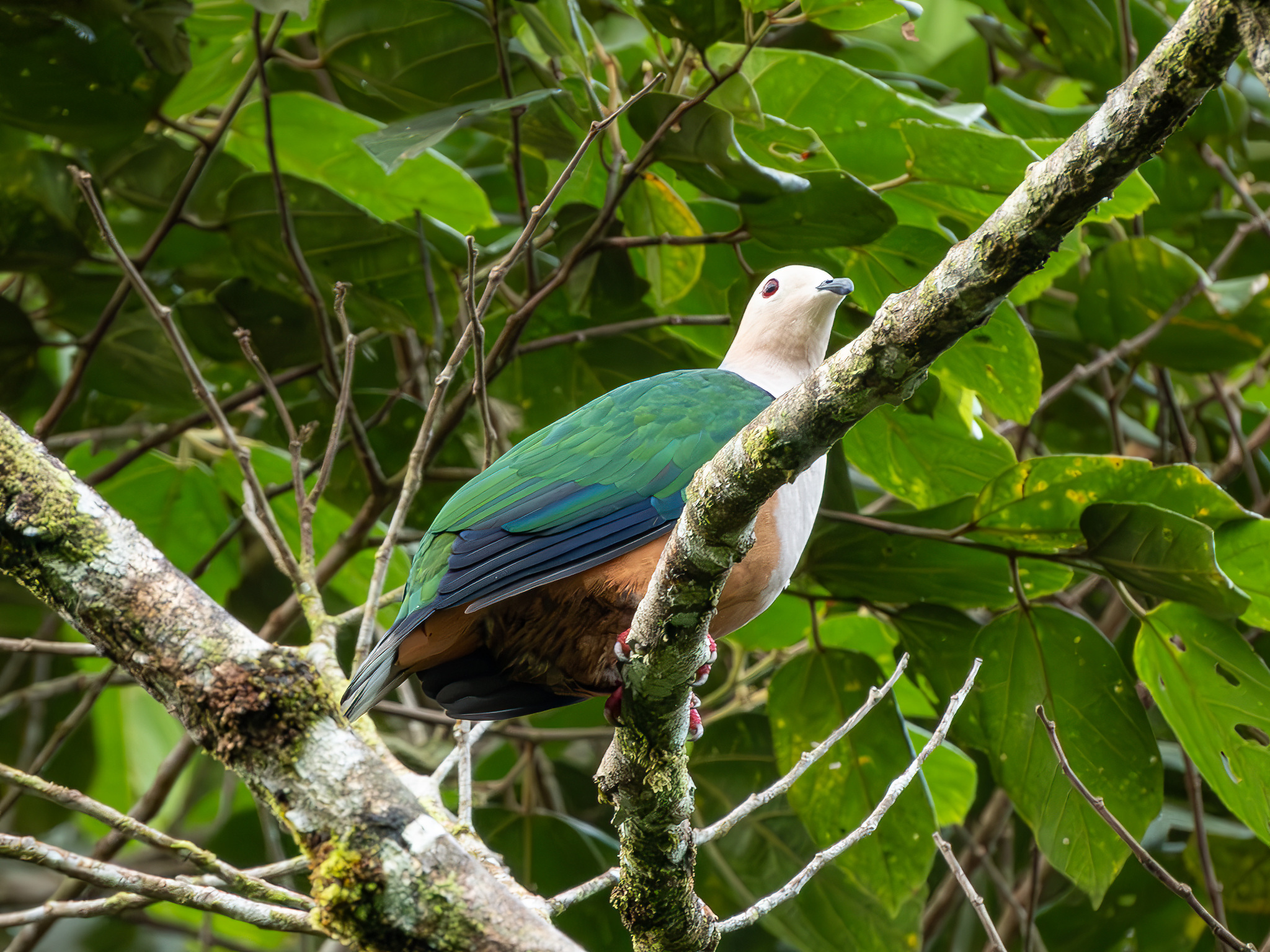

Conservation status
- Least Concern (IUCN 3.1)

Scientific classification
- Kingdom: Animalia
- Phylum: Chordata
- Class: Aves
- Order: Columbiformes
- Family: Columbidae
- Genus: Ducula
- Species: D. basilica

Binomial name
- Ducula basilica Bonaparte, 1854

= Cinnamon-bellied imperial pigeon =

Species of bird

The cinnamon-bellied imperial pigeon or cinnamon imperial pigeon (Ducula basilica) is a species of bird in the family Columbidae. It is endemic to the northern Moluccas. Its natural habitat is subtropical or tropical moist lowland forests.

The cinnamon-bellied imperial pigeon was formally described in 1854 by the French naturalist Charles Lucien Bonaparte from a specimen collected in Gilolo now Halmahera, the largest island in the Maluku Islands. He coined the current binomial name Ducula basilica. The specific epithet basilica is Latin for "magnificent" or "splendid". The cinnamon-bellied imperial pigeon was at one time considered as a subspecies of the purple-tailed imperial pigeon (Ducula rufigaster).

Two subspecies are recognised:

- D. b. basilica Bonaparte, 1854 – north Maluku Islands
- D. b. obiensis (Hartert, 1898) – Obi Islands (central Maluku Islands)

Some ornithologists treat D. b. obiensis as a separate species, the rusty imperial pigeon (Ducula obiensis).
