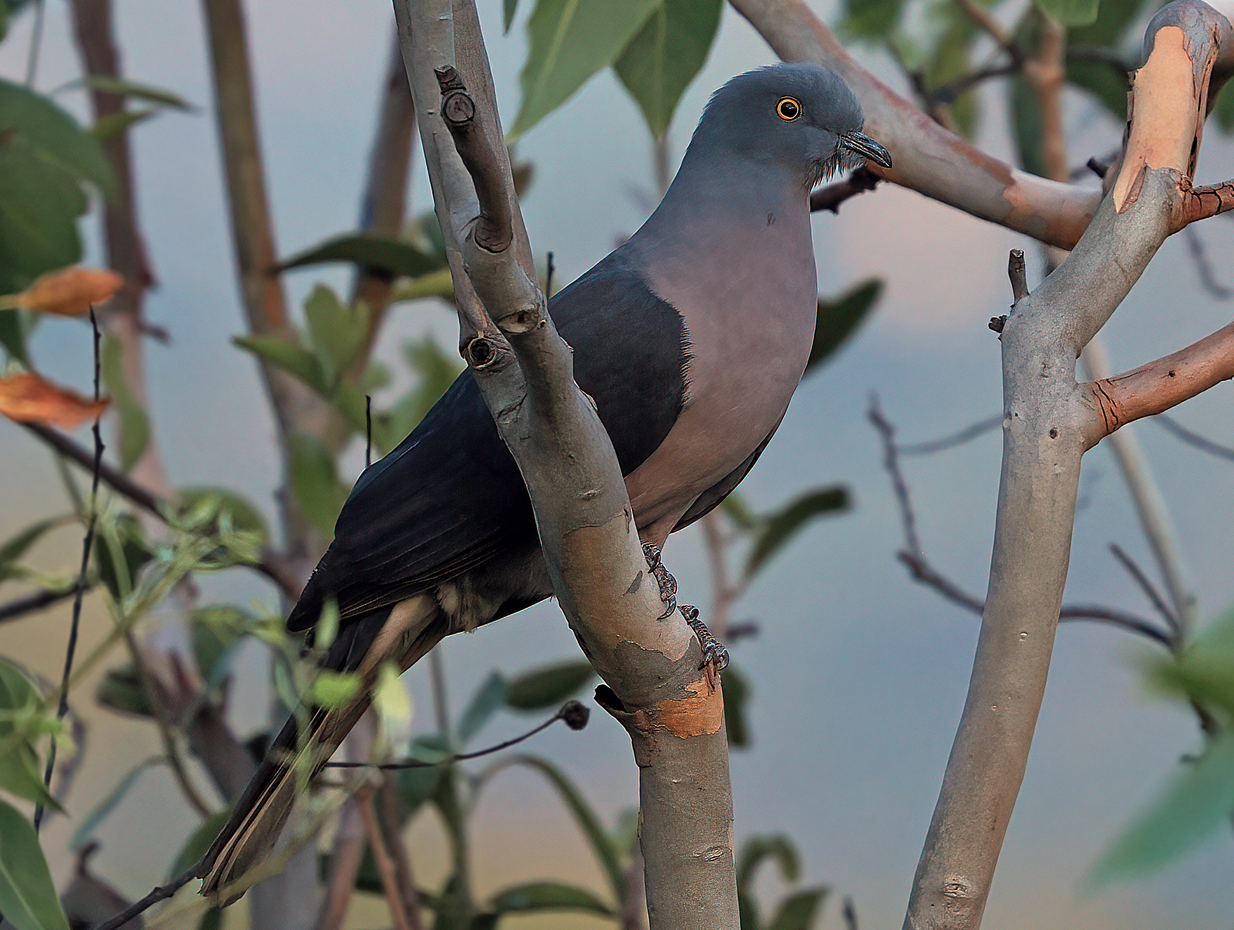

Conservation status
- Near Threatened (IUCN 3.1)

Scientific classification
- Kingdom: Animalia
- Phylum: Chordata
- Class: Aves
- Order: Columbiformes
- Family: Columbidae
- Genus: Ducula
- Species: D. cineracea

Binomial name
- Ducula cineracea (Temminck, 1835)

= Timor imperial pigeon =

Species of bird

The Timor imperial pigeon (Ducula cineracea) is a species of bird in the family Columbidae. It is found on Timor and Wetar. Its natural habitats are subtropical or tropical dry forests and subtropical or tropical moist montane forests. It is threatened by habitat loss.
