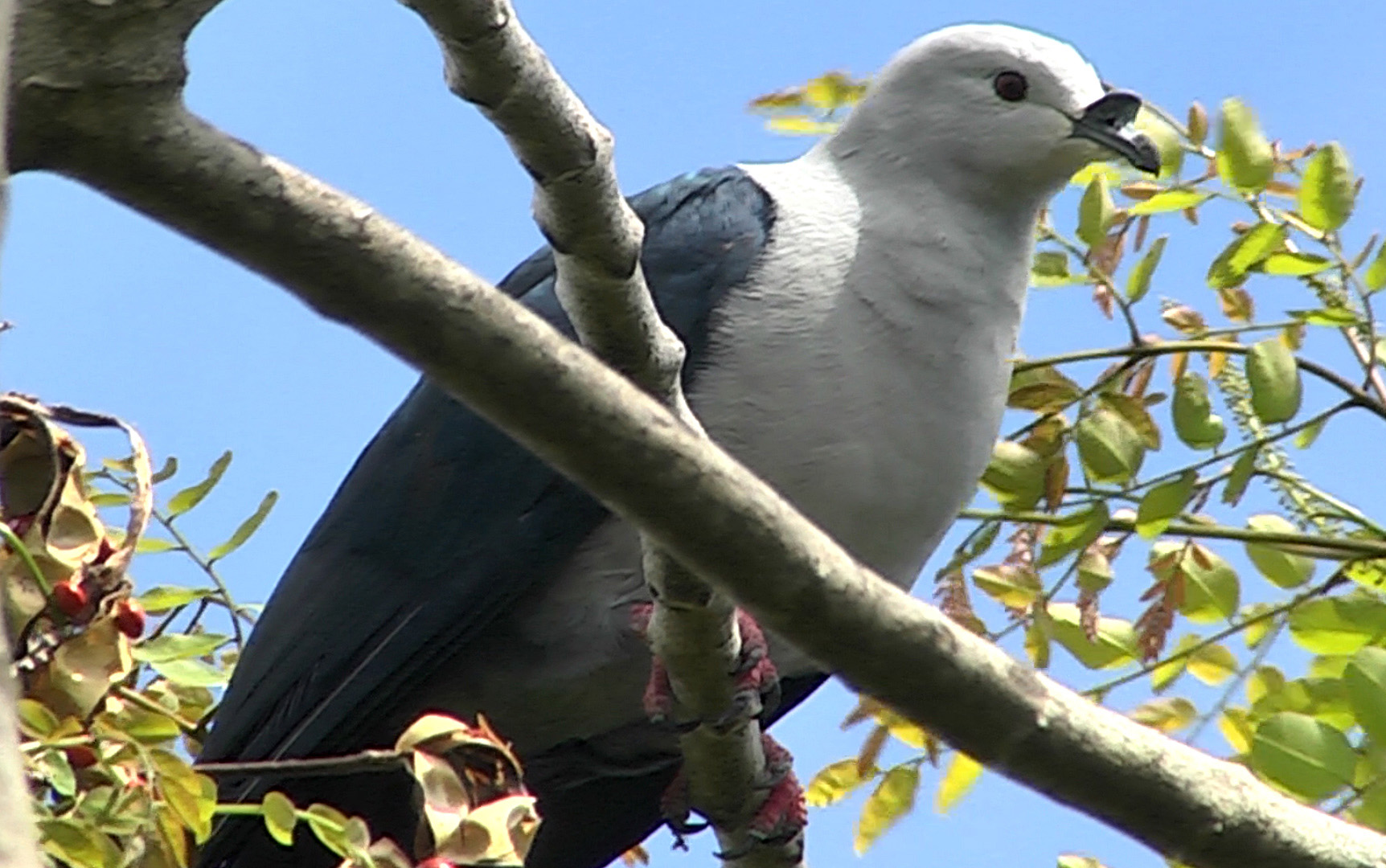

Conservation status
- Endangered (IUCN 3.1)

Scientific classification
- Kingdom: Animalia
- Phylum: Chordata
- Class: Aves
- Order: Columbiformes
- Family: Columbidae
- Genus: Ducula
- Species: D. aurorae

Binomial name
- Ducula aurorae (Peale, 1849)

= Polynesian imperial pigeon =

Species of bird

The Polynesian imperial pigeon or Society Islands pigeon (Ducula aurorae) is a species of bird in the family Columbidae. It is endemic to French Polynesia and consists of two subspecies, the extant Ducula aurorae aurorae of Makatea and the likely extinct Ducula aurorae wilkesii of the Society Islands.

== Taxonomy ==
The species was first described in 1849 by Titian Peale, then as two separate species under the names Carpophaga aurorae and Carpophaga wilkesii. Carpophaga would end up being considered a junior synonym of Ducula, and the two taxa were reclassified as subspecies, giving the modern taxonomy of the extant Ducula aurorae aurorae and likely extinct Ducula aurorae wilkesii.

Peale came upon the species during his time with the United States Exploring Expedition, the type localities for D. a. aurorae and D. a. wilkesii being "Aurora or Maitia Island" (today known as Makatea) and Tahiti, respectively. The specific name wilkesii is in honor of Captain Charles Wilkes, leader of the expedition.

== Description ==
Ducula aurorae is a large, knob-billed species of pigeon with broad rounded wings, and stands at about 51 cm (20 in) tall as an adult. Its plumages is silver-grey on its heads and most of their underparts, with dark bronzy-green upperparts and black undertail-coverts.

== Ecology ==
The species natural habitat is dense forests, on which it is highly dependent, but in recent times it has been found in secondary habitats such as gardens. It feeds on fruit of a great variety of both native and introduced trees, and is an important seed disperser on Makatea, accelerating the spread of native forest into areas which have been mined and deforested. It has a generation time of about 6.6 years.

== Distribution and conservation ==
Much of the habitat of D. a. aurorae, on Makatea, was destroyed by phosphate mining between 1917 and 1964, and hunting also took a toll on the population. After mining ceased, and hunting was reduced, the population began to recover, going from an estimated 100–500 individuals in 1986–87 to 870—1680 – corresponding to about 570–1200 mature individuals – in 2009, and their numbers are thought to since have further increased.

D. a. wilkesii was known to inhabit Tahiti and Moʼorea, in the Society Islands, but has most likely gone extinct. A study, observing the subspecies over the period 1986–1990, found its range to be restricted to the Papeno`o and Hitia`a valleys of Tahiti, and after no sightings were reported between 1998 and 2006 it was deemed unlikely to still be extant. It is thought that the spread of the swamp harrier – Circus approximans – played a role in the extinction, and the 2017 IUCN Red List assessment for D. aurorae deemed it to be "disastrous" for the species if the swamp harrier were allowed to establish itself on Makatea, viewing preventing that as the most important part of conservation efforts.

Outside of the Society Islands and Makatea, there are indications in the fossil record that the species' range at one point in history extended to the southern Cook Islands.

== In culture ==
The Polynesian imperial pigeon is featured in a folktale from Tupua'i, French Polynesia, in which it plays the role of a midwife for a sister who others refused to help in childbirth. In some versions of the story, it avenges its sister by casting all of the people of the island into the ocean.
