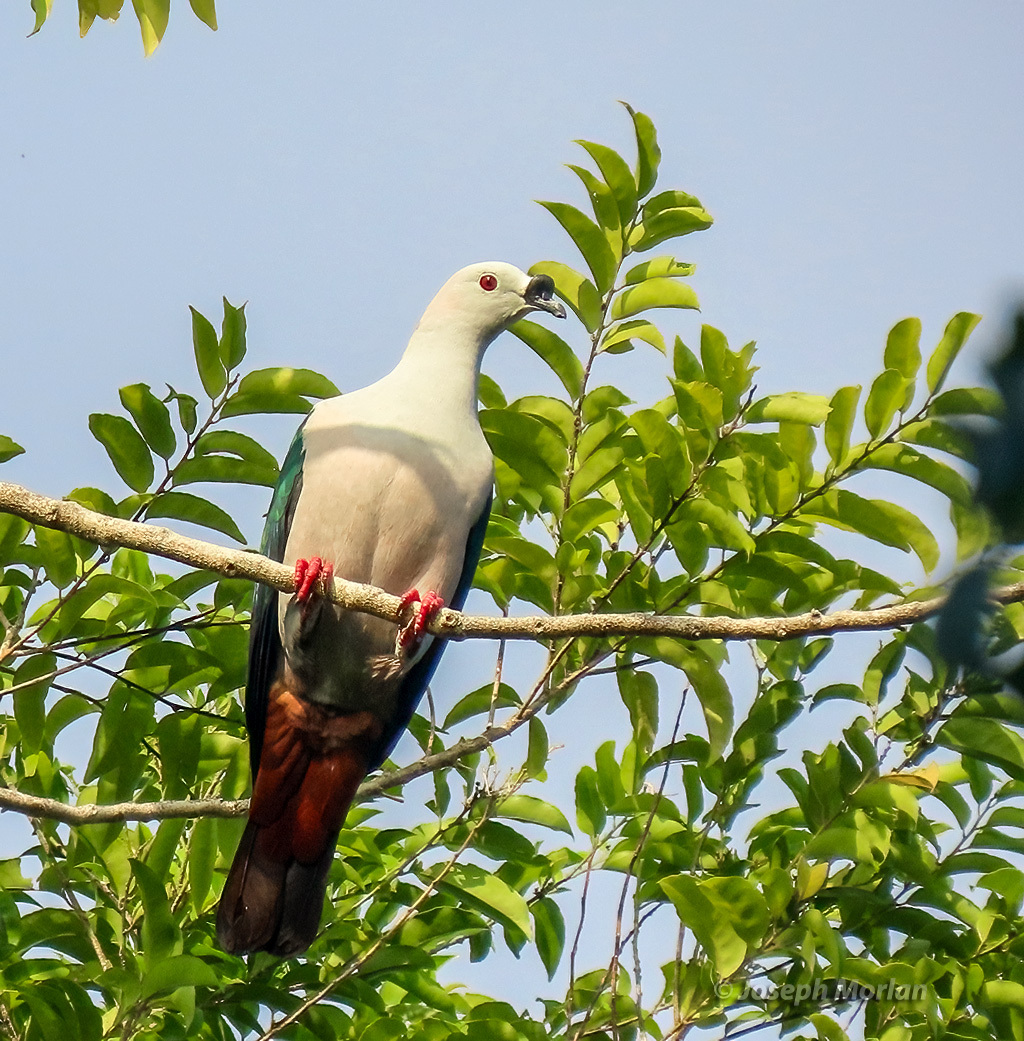

Conservation status
- Least Concern (IUCN 3.1)

Scientific classification
- Kingdom: Animalia
- Phylum: Chordata
- Class: Aves
- Order: Columbiformes
- Family: Columbidae
- Genus: Ducula
- Species: D. myristicivora

Binomial name
- Ducula myristicivora (Scopoli, 1786)

= Spice imperial pigeon =

Species of bird

The spice imperial pigeon (Ducula myristicivora) is a species of bird in the family Columbidae. It is endemic to Indonesia, where it occurs in the eastern Moluccas and the Raja Ampat Islands. Its natural habitats are subtropical or tropical moist lowland forests and subtropical or tropical mangrove forests. It eats, and is an important disperser of seeds for, fleshy fruits.

== Taxonomy ==
The spice imperial pigeon was formally described in 1786 by the Austrian naturalist Giovanni Antonio Scopoli and given the binomial name Columba myristicivora. The specific epithet myristicivora combines the botanical genus name Myristica that contains the nutmeg (from the Ancient Greek muristikos meaning "fragrant"), with the Latin -vorus meaning "eating". The type locality is New Guinea. This species is now placed in the genus Ducula that was introduced by the English naturalist Brian Houghton Hodgson in 1836.

The Geelvink imperial pigeon (D. geelvinkiana) of the Schouten (or Geelvink) Islands was formerly considered conspecific, but was recognized as a distinct species by the IOC in 2021.
