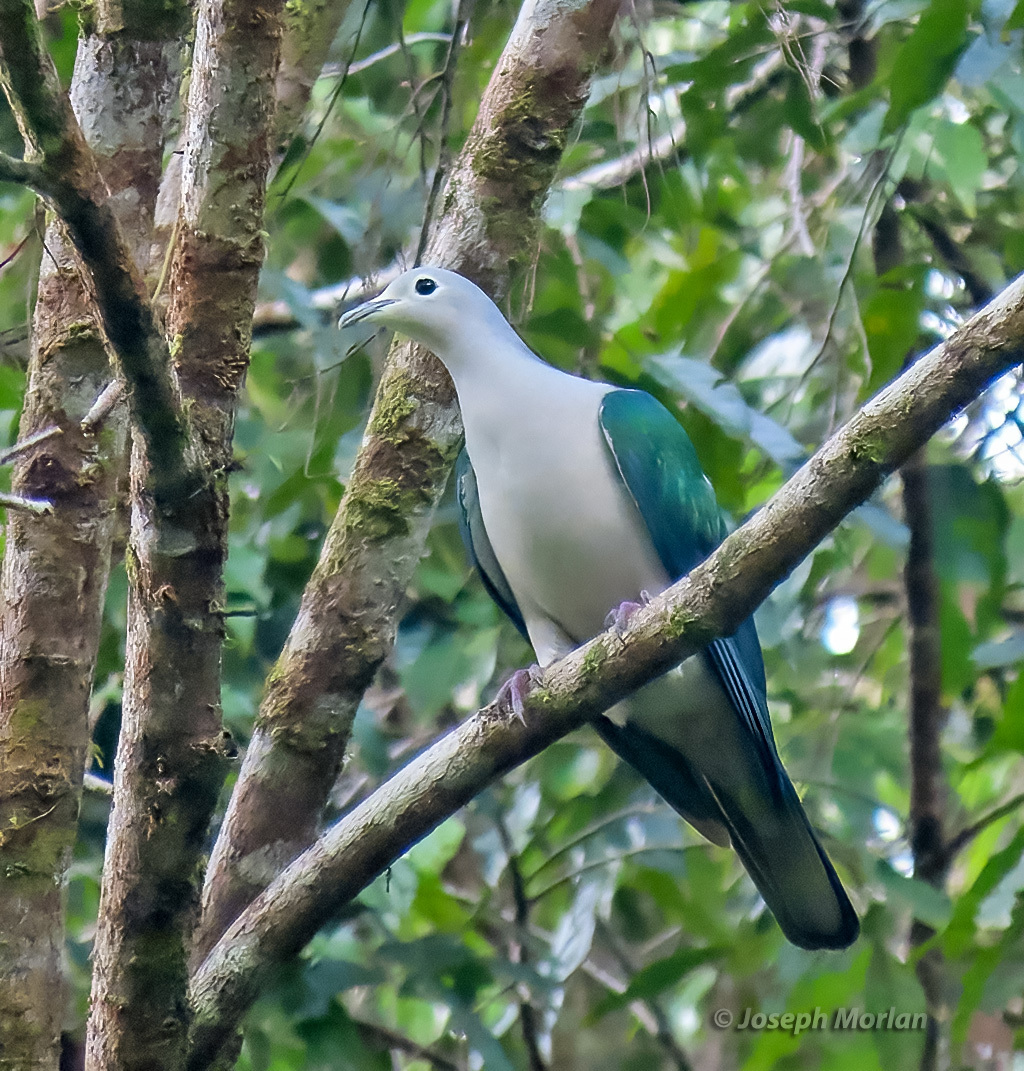

Conservation status
- Least Concern (IUCN 3.1)

Scientific classification
- Kingdom: Animalia
- Phylum: Chordata
- Class: Aves
- Order: Columbiformes
- Family: Columbidae
- Genus: Ducula
- Species: D. neglecta

Binomial name
- Ducula neglecta (Schlegel, 1866)

Synonyms
- Ducula perspicillata neglecta; Carpophaga neglecta

= Seram imperial pigeon =

Species of bird

The Seram imperial pigeon (Ducula neglecta) is a species of bird in the pigeon and dove family Columbidae. It is endemic to Seram and Ambon Island in the Maluku Islands (Moluccas) in Indonesia. On these islands it is found in primary rainforest and selectively logged forest.

The Seram imperial pigeon was described by the German scientist Hermann Schlegel in 1866, who named it as Carpophaga neglecta. The genus Carpophaga was merged with Ducula in 1937. The species has often been considered to be conspecific (the same species) as the spectacled imperial pigeon, which is found in other islands of the Maluku group, but differs in size, voice and plumage. The two form a species complex with the widespread green imperial pigeon, Enggano imperial pigeon and the elegant imperial pigeon.
