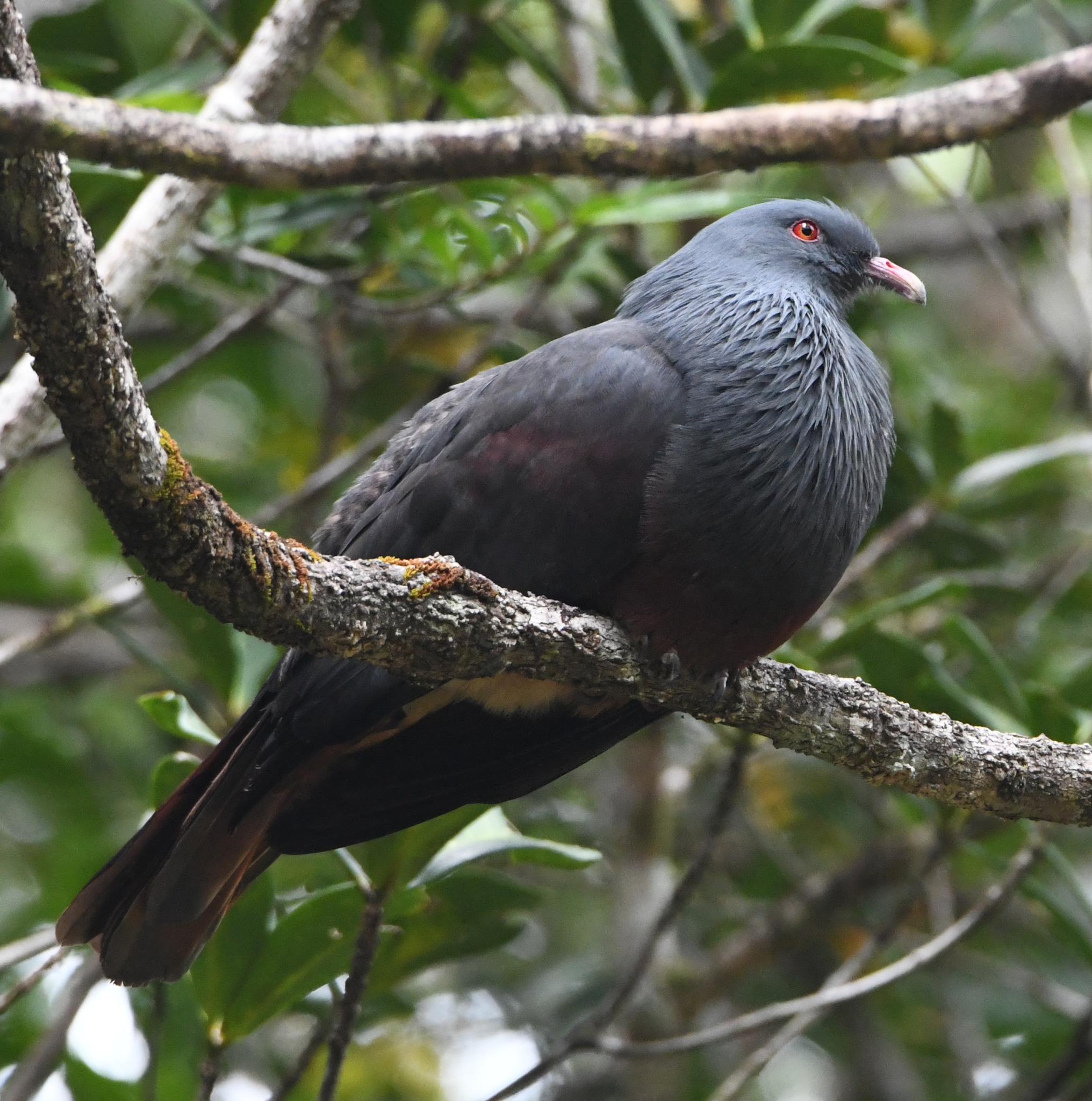

Conservation status
- Near Threatened (IUCN 3.1)

Scientific classification
- Kingdom: Animalia
- Phylum: Chordata
- Class: Aves
- Order: Columbiformes
- Family: Columbidae
- Genus: Ducula
- Species: D. goliath

Binomial name
- Ducula goliath (Gray, 1859)

= Goliath imperial pigeon =

Species of bird

The goliath imperial pigeon (Ducula goliath), also known as the New Caledonian imperial pigeon and the notou, is a species of bird in the family Columbidae. It is endemic to New Caledonia. Its natural habitat is humid forests. The International Union for Conservation of Nature (IUCN) has assessed it as a near-threatened species.

== Taxonomy ==
This species was described as Carpophaga (Phænorhina) goliath by George Robert Gray in 1859. It is a monotypic species.

== Description ==
The goliath imperial pigeon is about 51 cm (20 in) long, making it one of the largest species of arboreal pigeon. It is a slender bird with a long tail, weighing 600–716 g (21.2–25.3 oz). The head and neck are blue-grey. The upperparts and wings are sooty-grey, with a grey panel on the primaries' bases. The tail is black and has a dark chestnut band. The neck and upper breast have bifurcated feathers, so they appear shaggy or furrowed. The lower breast is sooty-grey, the belly and flanks are purplish-chestnut, and the vent is buffy-yellow. The eye is bright red, and the beak and feet are pinkish or vinous-red. The juvenile bird has a duller plumage, with no bifurcations.

== Distribution and habitat ==
This pigeon is endemic to New Caledonia, on Grande Terre and the Isle of Pines. Its habitat is mostly humid primary forest, up to 1,500 m (4,900 ft) in elevation.

== Behaviour ==
The goliath imperial pigeon is found singly or in pairs. It feeds on fruits, leaves and flowers, and it moves locally to eat fruits. Early in the morning, it warms itself on a branch. Its call is a low oom, and it also gives a gkrarr at dusk. It breeds from June to December. The nest, 30–40 cm (12–16 in) in diameter, is woven from twigs and built on a branch. One white egg is laid and incubated by both parents.

== Status ==
This species's population size is estimated to be between 100,000 – 220,000 mature individuals as of 2024. It is hunted as game both legally and illegally. Traditionally, it is hunted for feasts from late February to early May. Hunting is only legal during the week-ends of April though, with a limit on the number of captures per day per hunter. The IUCN considers the species to be safe at present, but it may decline in the future because of hunting, especially if hunting laws and the hunting season are changed. The IUCN has assessed it as a near-threatened species.
