= Enggano imperial pigeon =

Conservation status
- Near Threatened (IUCN 3.1)

Scientific classification
- Kingdom: Animalia
- Phylum: Chordata
- Class: Aves
- Order: Columbiformes
- Family: Columbidae
- Genus: Ducula
- Species: D. oenothorax

Binomial name
- Ducula oenothorax (Salvadori, 1892)

Species of bird

The Enggano imperial pigeon (Ducula oenothorax) is a species of bird in the family Columbidae. It is endemic to the Enggano Island. They are hunted by locals for food. Their habitat includes forest, shrubland, and heavily degraded former forest.
