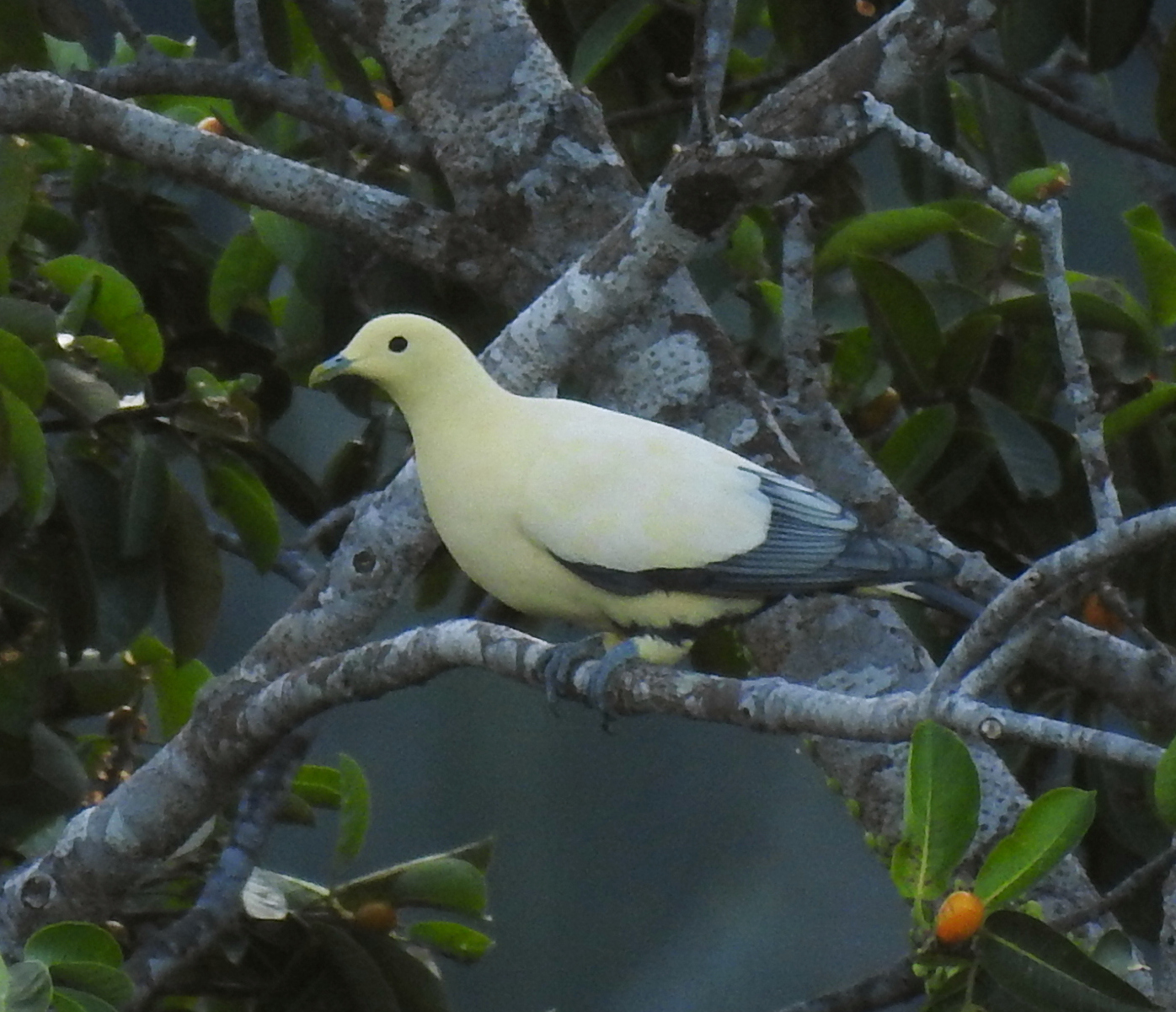

Conservation status
- Least Concern (IUCN 3.1)

Scientific classification
- Kingdom: Animalia
- Phylum: Chordata
- Class: Aves
- Order: Columbiformes
- Family: Columbidae
- Genus: Ducula
- Species: D. luctuosa

Binomial name
- Ducula luctuosa (Temminck, 1824)

= Silver-tipped imperial pigeon =

Species of bird

The silver-tipped imperial pigeon (Ducula luctuosa), also known as the white imperial pigeon or white-tipped imperial pigeon, is a relatively large species of bird in the family Columbidae. It is endemic to forest, woodland and mangrove on Sulawesi and smaller nearby islands.

== Description ==
It has sometimes been considered a subspecies of the pied imperial pigeon, but has a yellowish tip to the bill, black spotting near the vent, and silvery-grey remiges.
