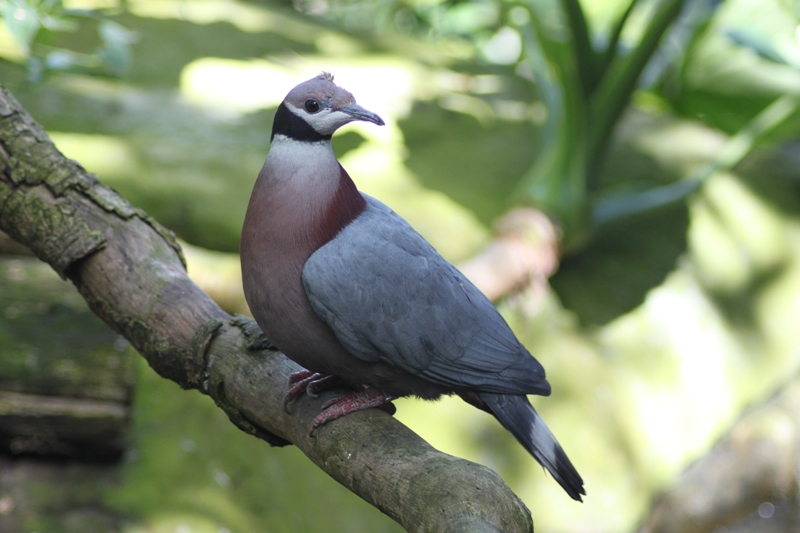
- At San Diego Zoo, San Diego, USA

Conservation status
- Least Concern (IUCN 3.1)

Scientific classification
- Kingdom: Animalia
- Phylum: Chordata
- Class: Aves
- Order: Columbiformes
- Family: Columbidae
- Genus: Ducula
- Species: D. mullerii

Binomial name
- Ducula mullerii (Temminck, 1835)

Synonyms
- Ducula müllerii (lapsus)

= Collared imperial pigeon =

Species of bird

The collared imperial pigeon (Ducula mullerii) is a large pigeon native to New Guinea and adjacent islands.

== Description ==
The species has an average body length of 40 cm and weighs about 600 g. It has grey upperparts and largely grey-pink underparts, and is distinguished by a striking and diagnostic complete black collar against an otherwise white throat.

== Distribution and habitat ==
The collared imperial pigeon occurs in northern and southern New Guinea and the Aru Islands. It has also been recorded from Boigu and Saibai islands. It may visit the northern Torres Strait islands as a vagrant.

It inhabits lowland rainforest, swamp forest, mangroves and riverine vegetation.

== Taxonomy ==
The binomial commemorates the German naturalist Salomon Müller. There are two recognized subspecies: the nominate D. m. mullerii (Temminck, 1835), in lowland southern New Guinea, including the offshore islands of Boigu, Saibai and Daru, and the Aru Islands; and D. m. aurantia (A. B. Meyer, 1893) in northern New Guinea, from Bintuni Bay and the east shore of Geelvink Bay to Astrolabe Bay.

== Diet ==
The pigeon principally feeds on fruit from forest trees and insects. In the Port Moresby area, the main food during June/July was reported to be fruit of Tristiropsis canarioides which made up nearly half the diet. Some 30% of food volume were ylang-ylang (Cananga odorata) fruit, the remainder being various Arecaceae (palm) fruits. Food is swallowed whole, and fruits thus eaten may have a diameter of up to 5 cm.

== Nesting ==
The species lays a single egg on a flimsy platform nest in forest tree adjoining wetland.
