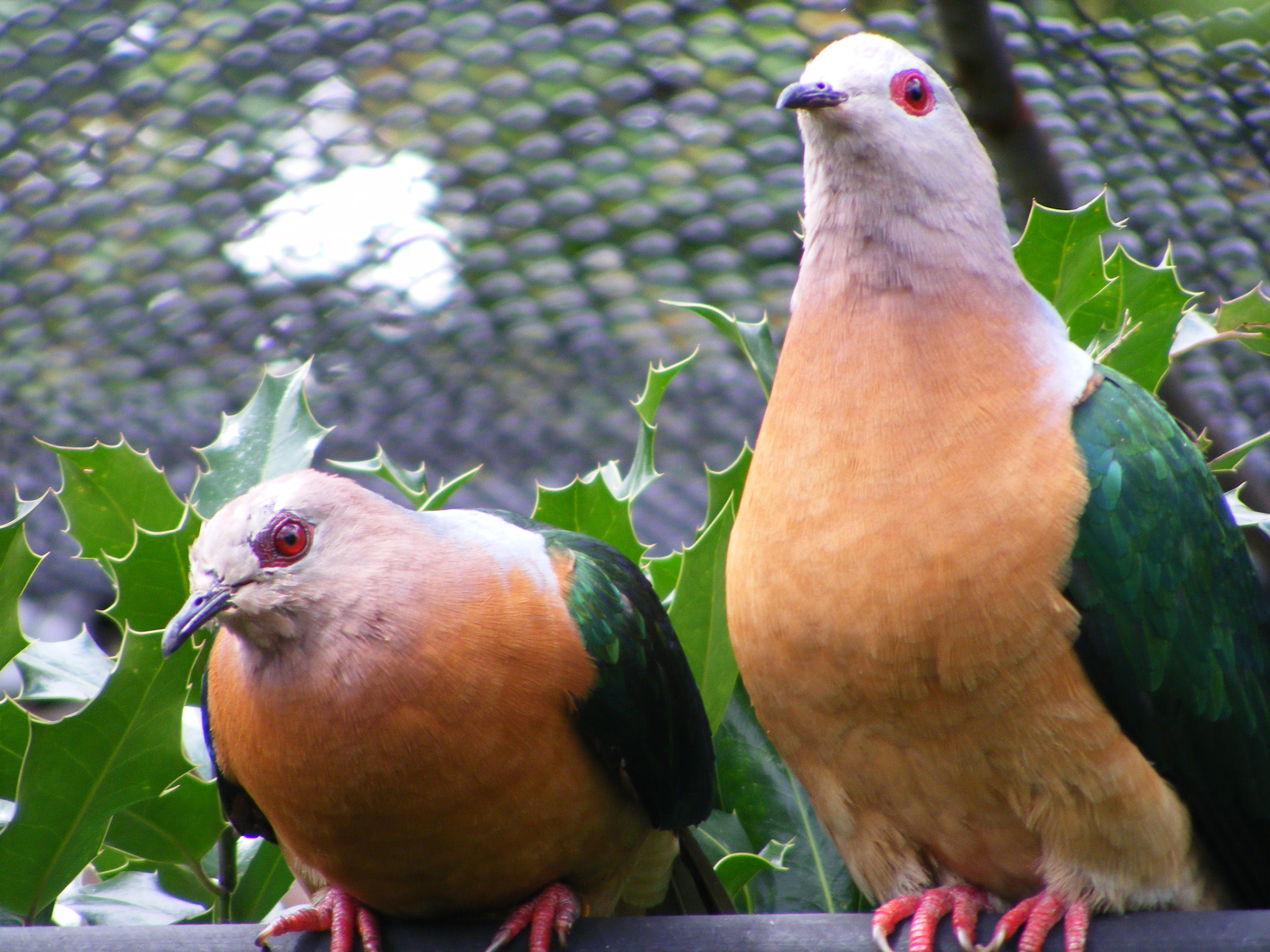
- Purple-tailed imperial pigeon (Ducula rufigaster), endemic to New Guinea

Scientific classification
- Kingdom: Animalia
- Phylum: Chordata
- Class: Aves
- Order: Columbiformes
- Family: Columbidae
- Tribe: Ptilinopodini
- Genus: Ducula; Hodgson, 1836

Type species
- Ducula insignis Hodgson, 1836

= Imperial pigeon =

Genus of birds

Ducula is a genus of the pigeon family Columbidae, collectively known as imperial pigeons. They are large to very large pigeons with a heavy build and medium to long tails. They are arboreal, feed mainly on fruit and are closely related to the other genus of fruit-eating doves, Ptilinopus. Both genera display brightly coloured plumage, predominantly green, often with contrasting under-parts of purple, orange or red. Some Ducula have prominently swollen ceres. They have large gapes and swallow seeds whole, playing an important role in seed dispersal.

Imperial pigeons are found in forests of southern Asia, New Guinea, northern Australia and the Pacific islands. Many species are nomadic, travelling long distances to exploit seasonal fruit sources. Some undertake migrations and all are strong fliers. Because of habitat loss and predation, species of Ducula are amongst the most threatened of avian species globally.

== Taxonomy ==
The genus Ducula was introduced in 1836 by the English naturalist Brian Houghton Hodgson with Ducula insignis as the type species. This taxon is now considered as a subspecies of the mountain imperial pigeon (Ducula badia). The genus name Ducula is from the Nepalese word for imperial pigeons, dukul.

The taxonomy of the imperial pigeon is unresolved, with the number of species within the genus Ducula reported variably as 34 and 36. Derek Goodwin's 1959 paper on the taxonomy of the genus Ducula divides his arrangement of 36 species into 7 subgroups according to distribution and phenotype, and this classification is followed by Gibbs et al. The current (2024) version of the IOC World Bird List includes 42 extant species and this is followed here.

=== Species ===
The genus contains 42 species:

| Section | Image | Scientific name | Distribution |
|---|---|---|---|
| Poliocephala species-group | | Ducula poliocephala (Gray, 1844) pink-bellied imperial pigeon | Philippines. |
| Poliocephala species-group | | Ducula forsteni (Bonaparte, 1854) white-bellied imperial pigeon | Indonesia (Sulawesi, Buton, Taliabu, Togian, and Peleng.) |
| Poliocephala species-group | | Ducula mindorensis (Whitehead, 1896) Mindoro imperial pigeon | Philippines (Mindoro) |
| Poliocephala species-group | | Ducula radiata (Quoy & Gaimard, 1830) Grey-headed imperial pigeon | Indonesia (Sulawesi) |
| Carola species-group | | Ducula carola (Gray, 1844) Spotted imperial pigeon | Philippines |
| Aenea species-group | | Ducula aenea (Linnaeus, 1766) Green imperial pigeon | Nepal, southern India and Sri Lanka eastwards to southern China, Indonesia and the Philippines. |
| Aenea species-group | | Ducula oenothorax (Salvadori, 1892) Enggano imperial pigeon | Enggano Island. |
| Aenea species-group | | Ducula nicobarica (Pelzeln, 1865) Nicobar imperial pigeon | Nicobar Islands. |
| Aenea species-group | | Ducula perspicillata (Temminck, 1824) Spectacled imperial pigeon | Maluku Islands. |
| Aenea species-group | | Ducula neglecta (Schlegel, 1866) Seram imperial pigeon | Moluccas |
| Aenea species-group | | Ducula concinna (Wallace, 1865) Elegant imperial pigeon | New Guinea, Talaud Islands, Sangihe, islands off southern Sulawesi, the southern Maluku Islands, and the eastern Lesser Sundas from Romang to Tanimbar, east up to the Aru Islands. |
| Aenea species-group | | Ducula pacifica (Gmelin, 1789) Pacific imperial pigeon | American Samoa, the Cook Islands, Fiji, Kiribati, Niue, Papua New Guinea, Samoa, Solomon Islands, Tokelau, Tonga, Tuvalu, Vanuatu, and Wallis and Futuna Islands. |
| Aenea species-group | | Ducula oceanica (Desmarest, 1826) Micronesian imperial pigeon | Palau, the Caroline Islands, the Marshall Islands and Nauru. |
| Aenea species-group | | Ducula aurorae (Peale, 1848) Polynesian imperial pigeon | French Polynesia. |
| Aenea species-group | | Ducula galeata (Bonaparte, 1855) Marquesan imperial pigeon | Nuku Hiva in the Marquesas Islands of French Polynesia. |
| Aenea species-group | | Ducula rubricera (Bonaparte, 1854) Red-knobbed imperial pigeon | Bismarck Archipelago and the Solomon Islands archipelago. |
| Aenea species-group | | Ducula myristicivora (Scopoli, 1786) Spice imperial pigeon | Indonesia |
| Aenea species-group | | Ducula geelvinkiana Schlegel, 1873 Geelvink imperial pigeon | Indonesia's Schouten Islands |
| Aenea species-group | | Ducula rufigaster (Quoy & Gaimard, 1830) Purple-tailed imperial pigeon | New Guinea. |
| Aenea species-group | | Ducula basilica Bonaparte, 1854 Cinnamon-bellied imperial pigeon | Moluccas. |
| Aenea species-group | | Ducula finschii (Ramsay, 1882) Finsch's imperial pigeon | Papua New Guinea. |
| Aenea species-group | | Ducula chalconota (Salvadori, 1874) Rufescent imperial pigeon | New Guinea. |
| Aenea species-group | | Ducula pistrinaria Bonaparte, 1855 Island imperial pigeon | Bismarck Archipelago and the Solomon Islands archipelago |
| Aenea species-group | | Ducula rosacea (Temminck, 1835) Pink-headed imperial pigeon | Lesser Sunda Islands of Indonesia |
| Aenea species-group | | Ducula whartoni (Sharpe, 1887) Christmas imperial pigeon | Christmas Island |
| Aenea species-group | | Ducula pickeringii (Cassin, 1854) Grey imperial pigeon | Sulu Archipelago, Miangas and Talaud Islands |
| | | Ducula latrans (Peale, 1848) Barking imperial pigeon | Fiji |
| Brenchleyi species-group | | Ducula brenchleyi (Gray, 1870) Chestnut-bellied imperial pigeon | Solomon Islands. |
| Brenchleyi species-group | | Ducula bakeri (Kinnear, 1928) Vanuatu imperial pigeon | Vanuatu |
| Brenchleyi species-group | | Ducula goliath (Gray, 1859) Goliath imperial pigeon | New Caledonia. |
| Brenchleyi species-group | | Ducula pinon (Quoy & Gaimard, 1824) Pinon's imperial pigeon | New Guinea. |
| Brenchleyi species-group | | Ducula melanochroa (Sclater, 1878) Black imperial pigeon | Bismarck Archipelago |
| Brenchleyi species-group | | Ducula mullerii (Temminck, 1835) Collared imperial pigeon | New Guinea |
| Zoe's imperial pigeon | | Ducula zoeae (Lesson, 1826) Zoe's imperial pigeon | New Guinea. |
| Badia species group | | Ducula cuprea (Jerdon, 1840) Malabar imperial pigeon | Western Ghats of India. |
| Badia species group | | Ducula badia (Raffles, 1822) Mountain imperial pigeon | Bangladesh, Bhutan, Brunei, Cambodia, China, India, Indonesia, Laos, Malaysia, Myanmar, Nepal, Thailand, and Vietnam |
| Badia species group | | Ducula lacernulata (Temminck, 1823) Dark-backed imperial pigeon | Lesser Sunda Islands. |
| Badia species group | | Ducula cineracea (Temminck, 1835) Timor imperial pigeon | Timor and Wetar. |
| Bicolor species-group | | Ducula bicolor (Scopoli, 1786) Pied imperial pigeon | Myanmar and Thailand, throughout Indonesia and east to the Philippines and the Bird's Head Peninsula in New Guinea. |
| Bicolor species-group | | Ducula luctuosa (Temminck, 1825) Silver-tipped imperial pigeon | Sulawesi |
| Bicolor species-group | | Ducula spilorrhoa (Gray, 1858) Torresian imperial pigeon | Australia (north-east Western Australia, north Northern Territory and north Queensland, including the Torres Strait Islands), New Guinea, Aru Islands, islands in the Geelvink Bay, D'Entrecasteaux Islands and Louisiade Archipelago. |
| Bicolor species-group | | Ducula subflavescens (Finsch, 1886) Yellowish imperial pigeon | Bismarck Archipelago. |

Two recently extinct species have also been described from archaeological remains:

- †Ducula tihonireasini from the Gambier Islands, French Polynesia
- †Shutler's fruit pigeon (Ducula shutleri) from Tonga

== Description ==
=== Poliocephala species-group ===
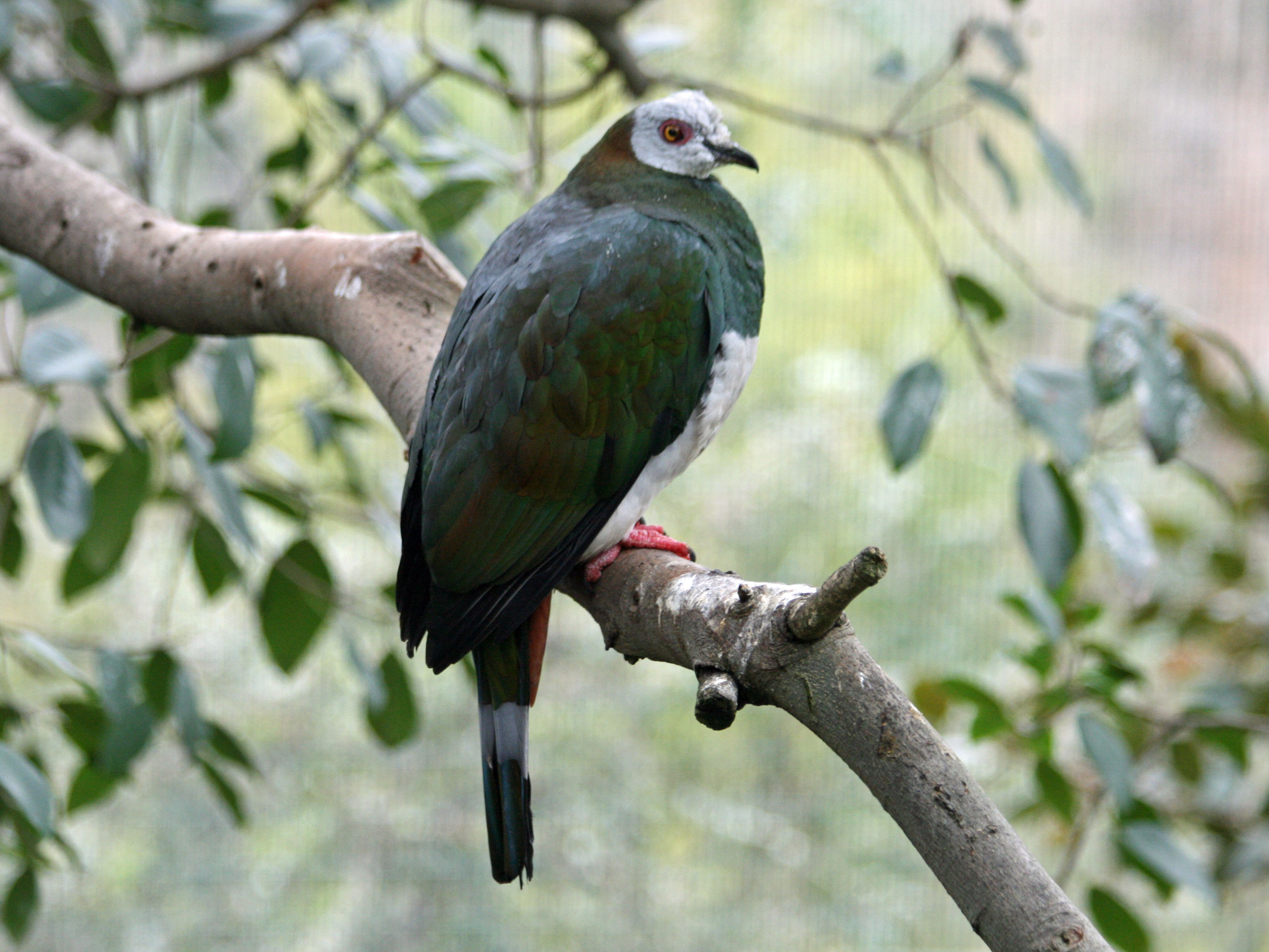
White-bellied imperial pigeon (D. forsteni) showing distinctive hood

Four species of imperial pigeon are found in Philippines and Sulawesi. All have a distinct pale band across the centre of the tail, and a rich green or purple dorsum. This grouping shares characteristics and distribution with Ptilinopus, and forms a link between the genera. The pink-belled (D. poliocephala) and the white-bellied (D. forsteni) imperial pigeon are similar and allopatric species. The Mindoro (D. mindorensis) and the grey-headed (D. radiata) imperial pigeons differ in size but are otherwise similar.

=== Carola species-group ===
The spotted imperial pigeon (D. carola) is sympatric to D. poliocephala, and though smaller, short tailed and with spotted plumage, it is similar enough in appearance and distribution to suggest the taxa are related.

=== Aenea species-group ===
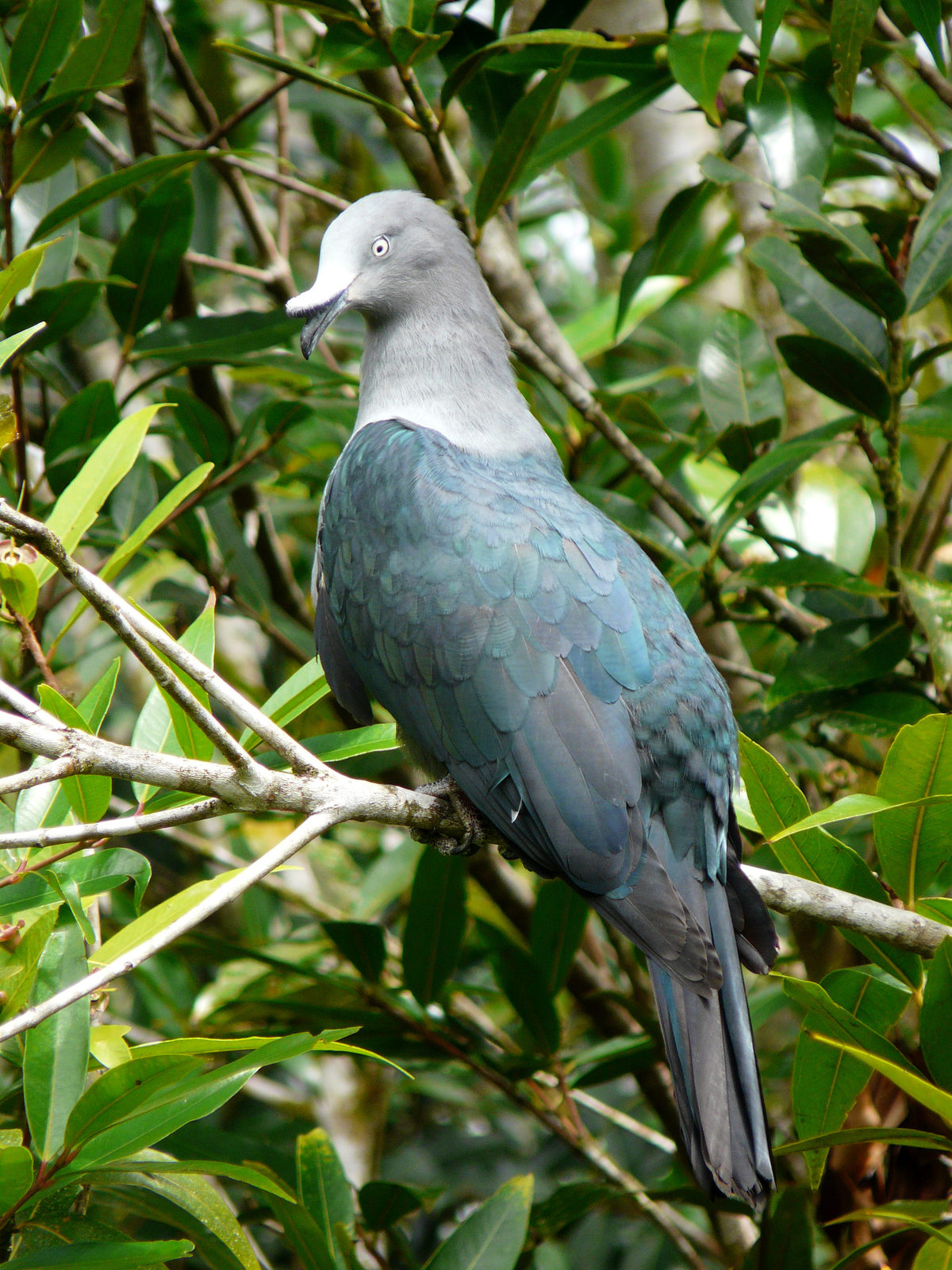
The Marquesan imperial pigeon (D. galeata) showing prominent pale cere

This group's nominate species is the green imperial pigeon (D. aenea), distinctive by its iridescent green, purple or bronze upper-parts and wings. The species-group is widespread through the Asia-Pacific. It is further separated into subgroups by Goodwin.

- Three Asian species with iridescent green upper-parts, pink head and neck with normal sized ceres; D. aenea, the elegant (D. concinna) and the white-eyed or spectacled (D. perspicillata) imperial pigeons.
- The pacifica subgroup of six species, similar to aenea but with enlarged ceres, and distributed throughout the Pacific. The Pacific (D. pacifica) and the Micronesian (D. oceania) imperial pigeons are similar allospecies, while the Polynesian (D. aurorae) and Marquesan (D. galeata) imperial pigeons are larger birds with dark plumage. The red-knobbed imperial pigeon (D. rubricera) and the spice imperial pigeon (D. myristicivora) are similar but found in Melanesia and New Guinea.
- The finschii subgroup of four species which may be New Guinea representatives of D. aenea stock; the purple-tailed (D. rufigaster), cinnamon-bellied (D. basilica) and Finsch's imperial pigeons, which all inhabit offshore islands. The shining or rufescent imperial pigeon (D. chalconota) occupies more elevated ranges on the New Guinea mainland.
- Another subgroup similar to aenea, but with upper parts not iridescent and less well defined, is the pink-headed imperial pigeon (D. rosacea) as the nominate species, the Christmas Island (D. whartoni), the grey (D. pickeringii) and the island (D. pistrinaria) imperial pigeons.

=== Brenchleyi species-group ===
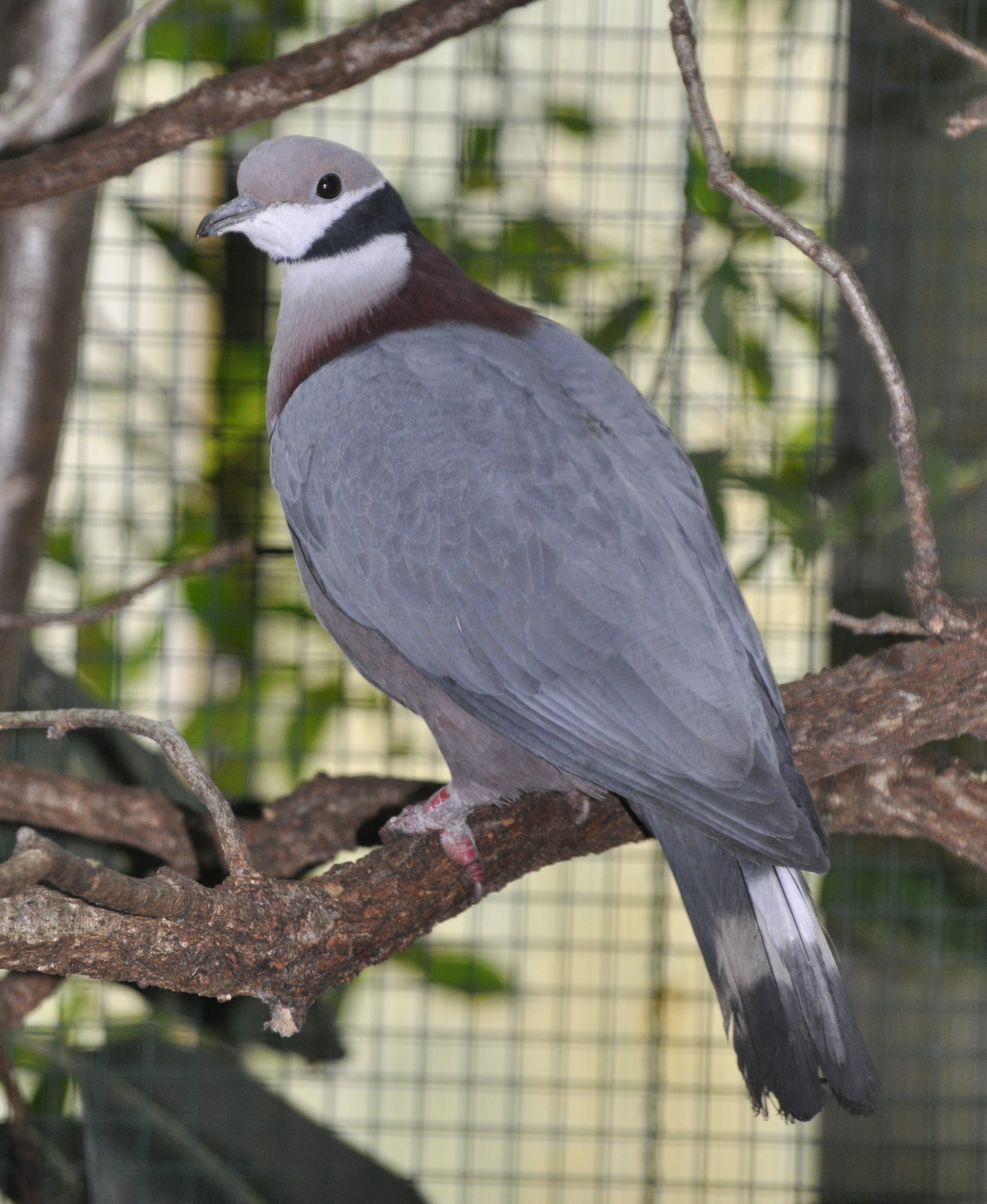
The collared imperial pigeon (D. mullerii) showing distinctive black collar

Contains 4 subgroups of large dark chestnut-bellied pigeons.

- The chestnut-bellied imperial pigeon (D. brenchleyi) is the nominate species with the Baker's (D. bakeri), Peale's (D. latrans), and New Caledonian (D. goliath) imperial pigeons, being allopatric through the Western Pacific islands.
- The Pinon imperial pigeon (D. pinon) is found in New Guinea and its islands.
- The collared imperial pigeon (D. mullerii) is found in New Guinea and Aru and has a distinctive dark collar.
- The Bismarck imperial pigeon (D. melanochroa) is found on the Bismarck Archipelago.

=== Zoe's imperial pigeon ===
D. zoeae of Indonesia and New Guinea, is sufficiently distinct in colour to be placed in a species-group of its own.

=== Badia species group ===
- The mountain (D. badia) and the dark-backed (D. lacernulata) imperial pigeons have a widespread distribution, the former from Indian subcontinent to south China and Malaysia, and the latter in southern Indonesia.
- The Timor imperial pigeon (D. cineracea) is a similar grey pigeon, but found in Timor.

=== Bicolor species-group ===
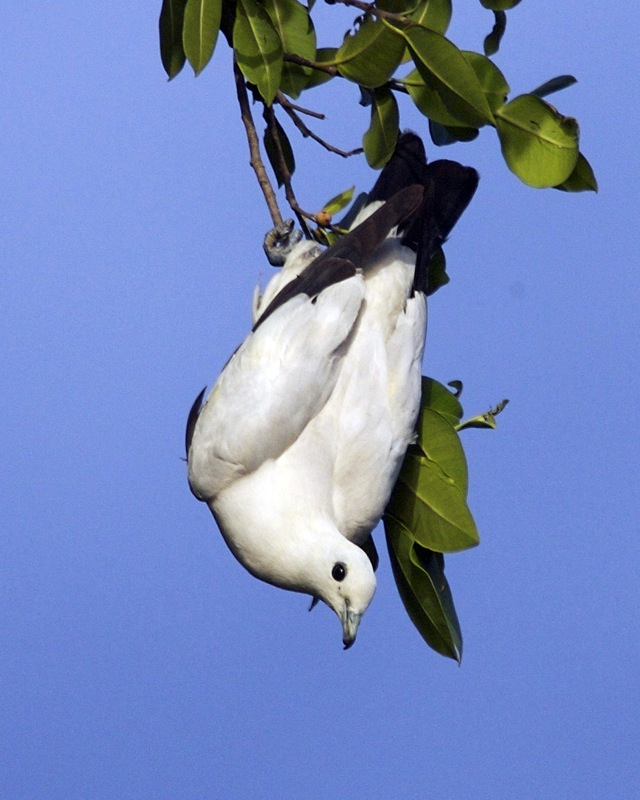
Pied imperial pigeon (D. bicolor)

The pied imperial pigeons form a discrete group of large white pigeons with black wingtips, found in New Guinea and its islands, and northern Australia. Goodwin recognised three species; the pied (D. bicolor) the white (D. luctuosa) and the Torresian (D. spilorrhoa). The three allopatric species are closely related and subsequent authors have challenged this ranking, Johnstone including all three in a single species. Gibbs et al. group D. bicolor and D. spilorrhoa together, but adds the yellow-tinted imperial pigeon (D. subflavescens) as another species. Frith includes D. subflavescens as a race of D. spilorrhoa. Sibley and Monroe (1990) follow Goodwin.

The difficulty in assigning or removing species rank is compounded by the lack of data on behaviour and breeding patterns of the taxa. Similar species are allopatric, and there is no data on whether the species freely interbreed or not. Data on voice and behaviour is similarly poor.

The confusion is not helped by English naming. D. bicolor is variously described as the nutmeg pigeon, the Torres Strait pigeon, and the pied imperial pigeon. D. spilorrhoa is also described as the nutmeg pigeon, the white nutmeg pigeon, the Australian pied pigeon, the Australian pied imperial pigeon, the Torres Strait pigeon or the Torresian imperial pigeon.

== Distribution and habitat ==
Imperial pigeons are only found in southern Asia, Australia, New Guinea and the Pacific, a distribution from the Himalayas (D. badia) to Tahiti in the South Pacific (D. aurorare). The greatest diversity of birds is in New Guinea. Imperial pigeons are strong fliers, are capable of flight over oceans, and have been successful in colonising islands and archipelagos.

Australia has a poor representation of Ducula amongst its fauna, with only one species breeding on the mainland (D. spilorrhoa). There is no clear explanation why more species of Ducula did not cross the Torres Strait islands to reach mainland Australia. The genus Lopholaimus, comprising only one species may have been well represented on the Australian mainland before European settlement, thus excluding Ducula.

Imperial pigeons are arboreal, and found almost exclusively in forest and woodland habitats where there is availability of fruit bearing trees. About half of the species occupy mountainous forest to elevations of 2500m. Many are found on islands, and live in coastal forests, with a few species inhabiting forest edges or mangroves.

== Appearance ==
Tropical species of pigeons can display a rich variety of colour, presumably to facilitate species recognition. The plumage of the seed-eating genera of Columbidae is more often dull brown or grey. Typically imperial pigeons have dark dorsum and wings, ranging from grey to iridescent green. Their breasts are paler, ranging in colour from grey through orange and pink to dark grey. Less conspicuous markings are found on birds isolated to islands. Most species display little or no sexual dimorphism.

Imperial pigeons are large to very large pigeons; typical length is 35 to 45 cm, and they have medium to long tails. The critically endangered Marquesan imperial pigeon is 50 cm long and is the largest arboreal pigeon in the family Columbidae.

Fat quills are present in D. bicolor and D. spilorrhoa. Fat quills are modified feathers that produce a lipoid substance that is used in a similar way to the secretions of the preen gland. Fat quills are found around the rump of D. bicolor and in other Columbidae species. Preening with the yellow coloured lipid causes variations in colour of the head and shoulders of D. bicolor, ranging from cream to yellow. Colouration differs between individuals and the stage of molt, deeper colouring found just prior to molt, leading to some confusion in identifying taxa. The function of the fat quills is debatable, with suggestions of a sexual signal, an antibacterial, or as an olfactory signal. Yellow lipoid substance can be expressed from the base of a broken rachis

== Behaviour ==
There is a paucity of information on most species of Ducula, many of which are shy and live in remote areas, making observation difficult. Breeding and nesting behaviour of species has been poorly documented. Though large and numerous, birds can be inconspicuous, feeding quietly in deep foliage.

Ducula are highly mobile and can travel large distances to find fruit. They are strong fliers and able to fly between islands to exploit erratic food sources. Small islands whose flora would be unable to sustain a long term population can provide a temporary food source for nomadic birds. Crome has documented daily flights of more than 32 km from island roosts to the mainland.

Some species live singly or in pairs, but many are highly social, forming flocks of 30 to 50 birds. Pied imperial pigeons favour off shore islands or mangroves for breeding sites. D. spilorrhoa forms large colonies on the Queensland coast, flying to fruit bearing forests during the day and roosting together at night. Low Isles in North Queensland hosted 20,000 to 25,000 birds in the 1971–1973 breeding seasons. A volunteer based count in December 2014 reported a similar number of over 22,000 pied imperial pigeons (pipwatch.net). An anecdotal report from 1908 describes flocks of 100,000 D. spilorrhoa flying from the mainland to their roosting sites on Dunk Island, North Queensland.

Pigeons drink by a pumping or sucking mechanism that allows them to drink with their beak continuously immersed in water. Fruit eating pigeons may utilize water from their diet and have less water requirements than other pigeons.

=== Diet ===
Imperial pigeons are arboreal, living in forests and mangroves that can supply seasonal fruit from tropical trees, palms, vines and bushes. Most birds clamber through twigs and branches of canopy, leaning or hanging upside down to reach fruit. Fruit is twisted off stems with their bill and swallowed whole. They are able to extend their gapes to 40mm in order to swallow large fruits. D. galeata can swallow seeds of 70mm. Their diet can be supplemented with flowers, leaves and insects.

In contrast to seed-eating pigeons, Ducula have thin-walled gizzards and short wide guts, allowing large seeds to pass through. After digesting the fleshy parts, they void the seeds intact, thus playing an important role as seed dispersers.

Other genera of Columbidae have grinding gizzards which either destroy seeds, or regurgitate larger seeds. Some large seeded fruits are eaten by both Nicobar pigeons (Colaenesa nicobarica) and imperial pigeons, with the former destroying seeds and the latter excreting them intact .

Imperial pigeons are amongst the largest frugivores in the forest, and can disperse seeds from fruit too large for most other species to handle. A fruit size of 30 mm would exclude all vertebrates other than hornbills (Bucerotidae) and Ducula. Medium-sized pigeons tend to feed on medium-sized fruit, while larger pigeons feed on larger fruit. Pacific pigeons (D. pacifica) are shown to be excellent seed dispersers in Tonga and are thus critical in the management of forests throughout their habitat.

=== Reproduction ===
Imperial pigeons construct somewhat flimsy nests of loosely woven twigs placed in the fork of a tree. Species that roost in mangroves construct more substantial nests from mangrove shoots. They generally lay a single egg with a relatively short incubation period. Both sexes share incubation and care of nestlings. Ducula, typical of most pigeons, produce a nutritiously rich crop milk which allows the chicks to rapidly fledge and leave the nest, reducing their period of vulnerability. The breeding cycle is short, allowing several broods to be reared in succession over an extended summer breeding season.

Crop milk is a thick cheesy substance, derived from squamous cells sloughed off from the crop of both male and female pigeons which promotes a high growth rate in squabs. There are no studies of the composition of crop milk specific to Ducula. However, in domestic pigeons (Columba livia), the crop milk is found to contain lipids, proteins and enzymes, and also facilitates the transfer of maternal antibodies to squabs, as in mammals. The hypertrophy of crop tissue and production of crop milk is determined by the hormone prolactin, as in mammals.

An abundance of fruit is important to the breeding success of frugivorous birds. Large breeding colonies require unexploited forest to provide fruit bearing trees for daily feeding.

=== Voice ===
Variable between species, but ranging from typical 'coo' and 'coo-woo' of other pigeon families, to resonant 'whoops', abrupt booming calls or barking notes, to disyllabic deep booming calls.

=== Migration ===
Columbidae are generally strong fliers and effective colonisers, being able to make across ocean flights to access seasonal fruit supplies. D. bicolor is partly migratory, its distribution changing according to food availability.

== Ecology and conservation ==
About one third of extant pigeons in the family Columbidae are endangered to a greater or lesser degree, making the family one of the most threatened in the world. Asia, Australasia and Oceania are home to nearly two-thirds of extant species of Columbidae, but three quarters of those species are threatened.

The greatest threats to Columbidae species is habitat loss and degradation, hunting by man, and alien predators. Other threats include disease and possible competition from introduced species. Large flocks of Ducula are mobile and able to exploit large areas for food sources, but are nevertheless vulnerable to large scale loss of forests.

Pigeons are exploited by man for food and sport. Hunting of D. spillorhoa on the Australian mainland has reduced populations. Hunting for food remains a problem in Asia and the Pacific as Columbidae provides a palatable source of protein. Historically, human habitation has been associated with extinctions.

Many species of Ducula live on forested islands in the Indian Ocean, SE Asian archipelagos and on Pacific and Australasian islands. Island species are particularly vulnerable as highly specialised populations, ill-prepared for introduced predators such as cats, rats and stoats.

One of the most threatened species of Ducula is the Marquesan imperial pigeon (D. galeata) whose numbers have been reduced from 250 individuals in 1998 to fewer than 100 birds in 2000. A translocation programme has been initiated, increasing the number of islands in which D. galeata has a breeding colony.

Frugivorous pigeons play an important role in seed dispersal and the preservation of tropical forest diversity. Population loss may have a detrimental effect on fauna of a region, especially when deforestation by logging leaves large cleared areas needing rehabilitation.
