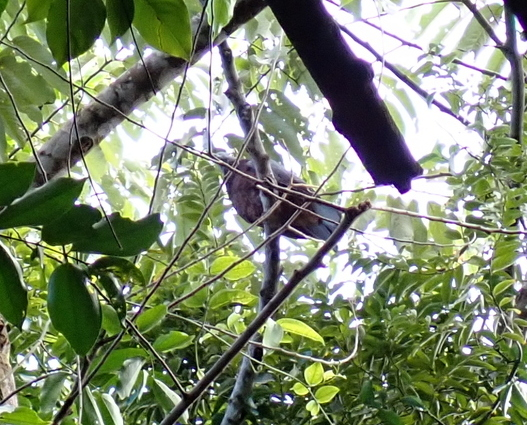

Conservation status
- Least Concern (IUCN 3.1)

Scientific classification
- Kingdom: Animalia
- Phylum: Chordata
- Class: Aves
- Order: Columbiformes
- Family: Columbidae
- Genus: Ducula
- Species: D. bakeri

Binomial name
- Ducula bakeri (Kinnear, 1928)

= Vanuatu imperial pigeon =

Species of bird

The Vanuatu imperial pigeon or Baker's imperial pigeon (Ducula bakeri) is a species of bird in the family Columbidae. It is endemic to Vanuatu and lives in forests. It is threatened by forest clearing, and although it has a restricted range the International Union for Conservation of Nature (IUCN) has assessed it as a least concern species.

== Taxonomy ==
Norman Boyd Kinnear described the species from Santo in 1928, as Muscadivora bakeri. The specific name of this bird commemorates the British zoologist John Randal Baker, who discovered the species.

== Description ==
The Vanuatu imperial pigeon is about 40 cm (16 in) long. The head and nape are sooty blue-grey, and the neck is dark purplish-maroon. The mantle, back and wing coverts are sooty-grey and have a steely sheen. The underwing coverts are chestnut, and the flight feathers are rufous. The throat is dark grey. The breast is dark purplish-maroon with a slight gloss, and the belly is deep chestnut. The uppertail coverts are black, and the undertail coverts are rufous. The eyes are yellow, the beak is black, and the feet are pinkish-red. The female is a little smaller and duller than the male. The juvenile bird has much duller plumage with no gloss.

== Distribution and habitat ==
This pigeon is endemic to Vanuatu, occurring on several larger islands. Its habitat is mostly montane forests, and it also occurs in lowlands. On Santo, it lives in forests above 500 m (1,600 ft) in elevation.

== Behaviour ==
The Vanuatu imperial pigeon is usually found singly or in pairs in the canopy; small parties are sometimes found. It is a wary bird that is not easily found. A frugivore, it eats fruits of trees, shrubs and vines, and it moves within islands to search for food. Its call is a powerful repeated twoo-too-too-too-too. Its breeding biology is unknown.

== Status ==
The population of the species is estimated at 800 to 23,000 mature individuals, or 1,200 to 35,000 birds in total. The population is probably declining since it is threatened by the clearing of forests for agriculture and hunting. The IUCN has assessed it as a least-concern species.
