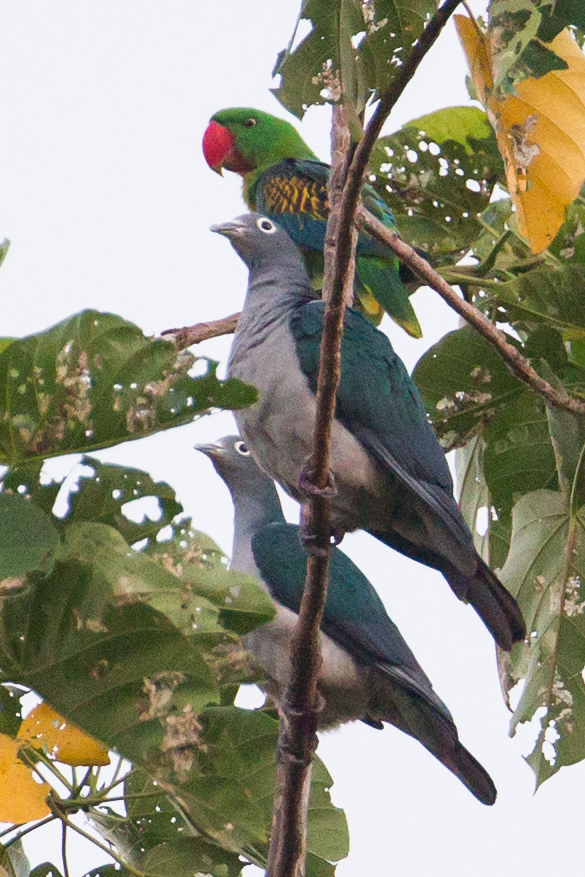

Conservation status
- Least Concern (IUCN 3.1)

Scientific classification
- Kingdom: Animalia
- Phylum: Chordata
- Class: Aves
- Order: Columbiformes
- Family: Columbidae
- Genus: Ducula
- Species: D. perspicillata

Binomial name
- Ducula perspicillata (Temminck, 1824)

= Spectacled imperial pigeon =

Species of bird

Spectacled Imperial-Pigeon in Halmahera

The spectacled imperial pigeon (Ducula perspicillata) is a species of bird in the family Columbidae. It is endemic to the Maluku Islands.

Its natural habitats are subtropical or tropical moist lowland forest and subtropical or tropical mangrove forest, especially recently disturbed forests.

== Taxonomy and systematics ==
The spectacled imperial pigeon is a species in the large genus of imperial pigeons, Ducula. Within the genus, it is most closely related to the Seram imperial pigeon, with which it is sometimes considered conspecific. These two species form a species group with the green imperial pigeon and elegant imperial pigeon.

The species' generic name comes from the Neo-Latin ducula (duke), while the specific epithet perspicillata is from the Modern Latin perspicillata (spectacled), derived the Latin perspicillum (lens), which is itself from the Latin perspicere (to see through). Alternative names for the orange fruit dove include white-eyed imperial pigeon, white-spectacled imperial pigeon, and Moluccan imperial pigeon.

It is monotypic. However, the Seram imperial pigeon is sometimes considered to be a subspecies of this species.
