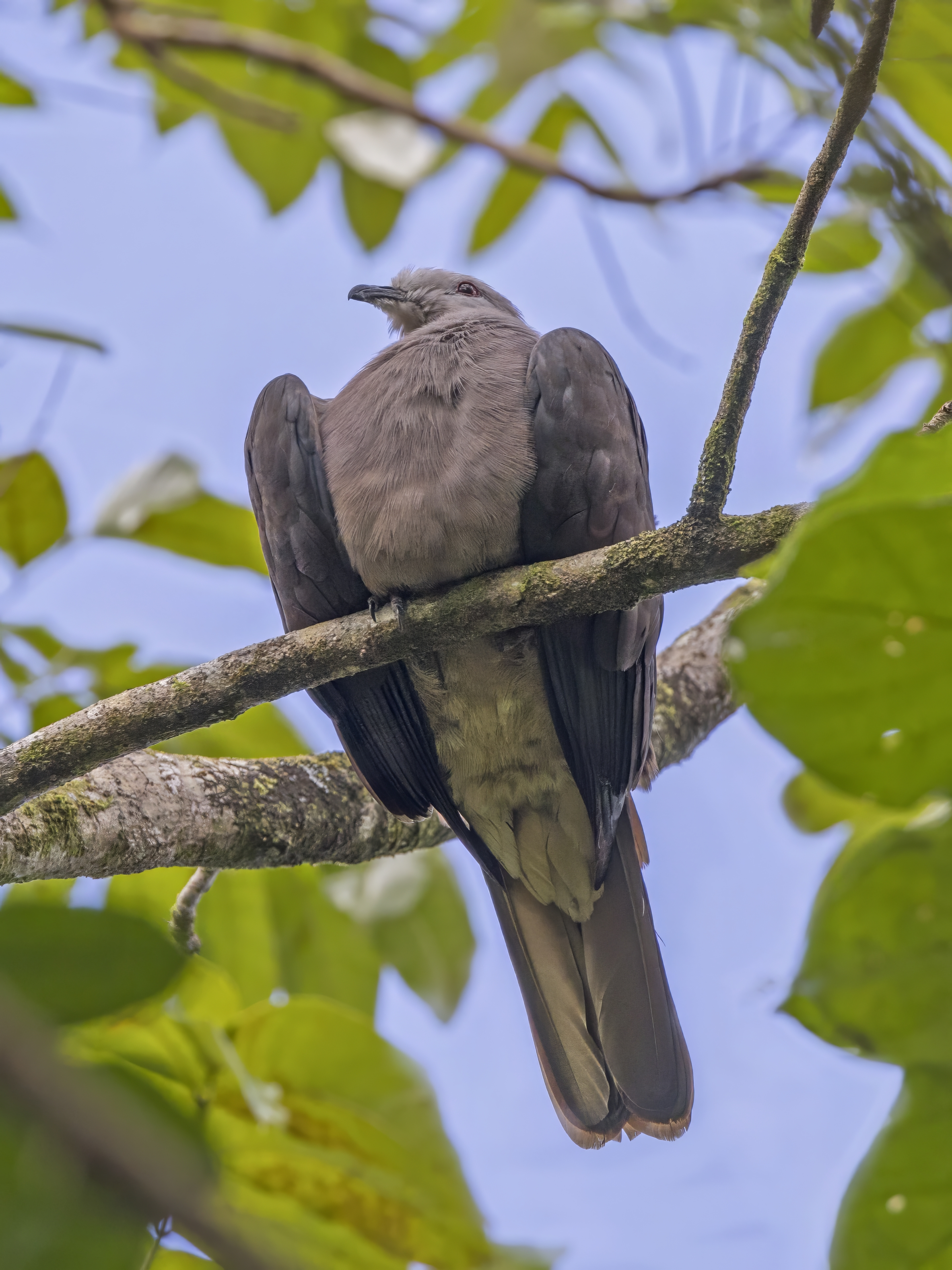
- On Viti Levu

Conservation status
- Least Concern (IUCN 3.1)

Scientific classification
- Kingdom: Animalia
- Phylum: Chordata
- Class: Aves
- Order: Columbiformes
- Family: Columbidae
- Genus: Ducula
- Species: D. latrans

Binomial name
- Ducula latrans (Peale, 1849)

= Barking imperial pigeon =

Species of bird

The barking imperial pigeon (Ducula latrans), also known as Peale's imperial pigeon, is a species of bird in the pigeon family Columbidae. It is endemic to Fiji, where it occurs on most of the medium and large islands.

Its natural habitats are mature tropical moist lowland forests and tropical moist montane forest. The species is one of two imperial-pigeons found in Fiji; the other, the Pacific imperial pigeon, is found on smaller islands.

== Description ==
The barking imperial pigeon is frugivorous, feeding on large fruits of the trees Cananga, Didymocheton, and Myristica (nutmegs). It feeds alone or in pairs, occasionally occurring in small flocks on fruiting trees. The breeding season of this species is from May to January, with a single egg being laid on an insubstantial twig nest. These birds are typically 40-44cm. The upper parts of this bird are grey. The upper wings and upper tail are a darker shade of brown. It has a black bill and the eyes are purple and red. Additionally, the bird got its name because it known to make loud barking "u-oo" in long series. Also, they make a "raa" noise. These calling are often associated with mating. Due to human hunting and interference the habitat for this bird is being put in danger and there has been a decline in the population of these birds!
