= Chestnut-bellied imperial pigeon =

Conservation status
- Near Threatened (IUCN 3.1)

Scientific classification
- Kingdom: Animalia
- Phylum: Chordata
- Class: Aves
- Order: Columbiformes
- Family: Columbidae
- Genus: Ducula
- Species: D. brenchleyi

Binomial name
- Ducula brenchleyi (Gray, GR, 1870)

Species of bird

The chestnut-bellied imperial pigeon (Ducula brenchleyi), or Brenchley's pigeon, is a species of bird in the family Columbidae. It is endemic to the southern Solomon Islands.

Its natural habitats are subtropical or tropical moist lowland forests and moist montane forests, predominantly at elevations of 200–700 meters—though is now confined to higher elevations in many regions due to deforestation.

Due to tree cover loss from 2001 to 2019, it was estimated that a decrease in population size may occur. Additionally, it may be extinct on some of the satellite islands of the Solomon Islands.

== Etymology ==
The genus name, Ducula, comes from the Nepali dukul, the Nepali name for the imperial pigeons. The specific epithet, brenchleyi, is an honorific to Julius Lucius Brenchley (1816–1873), an English traveller and collector in Melanesia.

== Habitat and ecology ==
The chestnut-bellied imperial pigeon has an extent of occurrence of 38,500 km^{2} (14,900 sq mi). Their main habitat is tropical to semitropical moist lowland forests, though montane and heavily degraded former forests are suitable. They are endemic to the Solomon Islands, specifically Guadalcanal, Malaita, and Makira, as well as some satellite islands. While it can occur at elevations of 0–700 m (0–2,297 ft) above sea level, it is mostly confined to higher elevations due to deforestation.

It was estimated in 2019 that the population was 1,100–19,999 mature individuals. Though, having an estimated 7% decrease in tree cover with at least 30% canopy cover lost from 2001 to 2019, it was predicted that a 1–19% decrease in population size may occur. Additionally, it is suspected that the chestnut-bellied imperial pigeon may be extinct on Ulawa Island and the Olu Malau Islands (Three Sisters Islands) of the Solomon Islands.

They are nomadic migrants, leaving an area when food is scarce to find more prosperous land.

They reach reproductive age at 2.1 years, typically living to 5.3 years, though some specimens have reached 14.53 years old. Their trophic level is that of an herbivore, and their trophic niche is that of a frugivore (fruiteater). They feed primarily on banyan figs, but also feed on the fruits of the Canarium solomonense tree and various other fruit.

== Description ==
The dominant colors of the chestnut-bellied imperial pigeon are grey, black, white, and brown, with small amounts of red, violet, beige, and blue. They measure 40 cm (16 in) from beak-tip to tail-tip. From above they are entirely grey, and their belly and undertail are chestnut. Their head is pale. They weigh 380 g (13 oz). Their wingspan is 43.24 cm (17.02 in). The length of their legs is 2.99 cm (1.18 in). The length of their beak is 1.38 cm (0.54 in), with width and height being 0.61 cm (0.24 in) and 0.55 cm (0.22 in), respectively.
