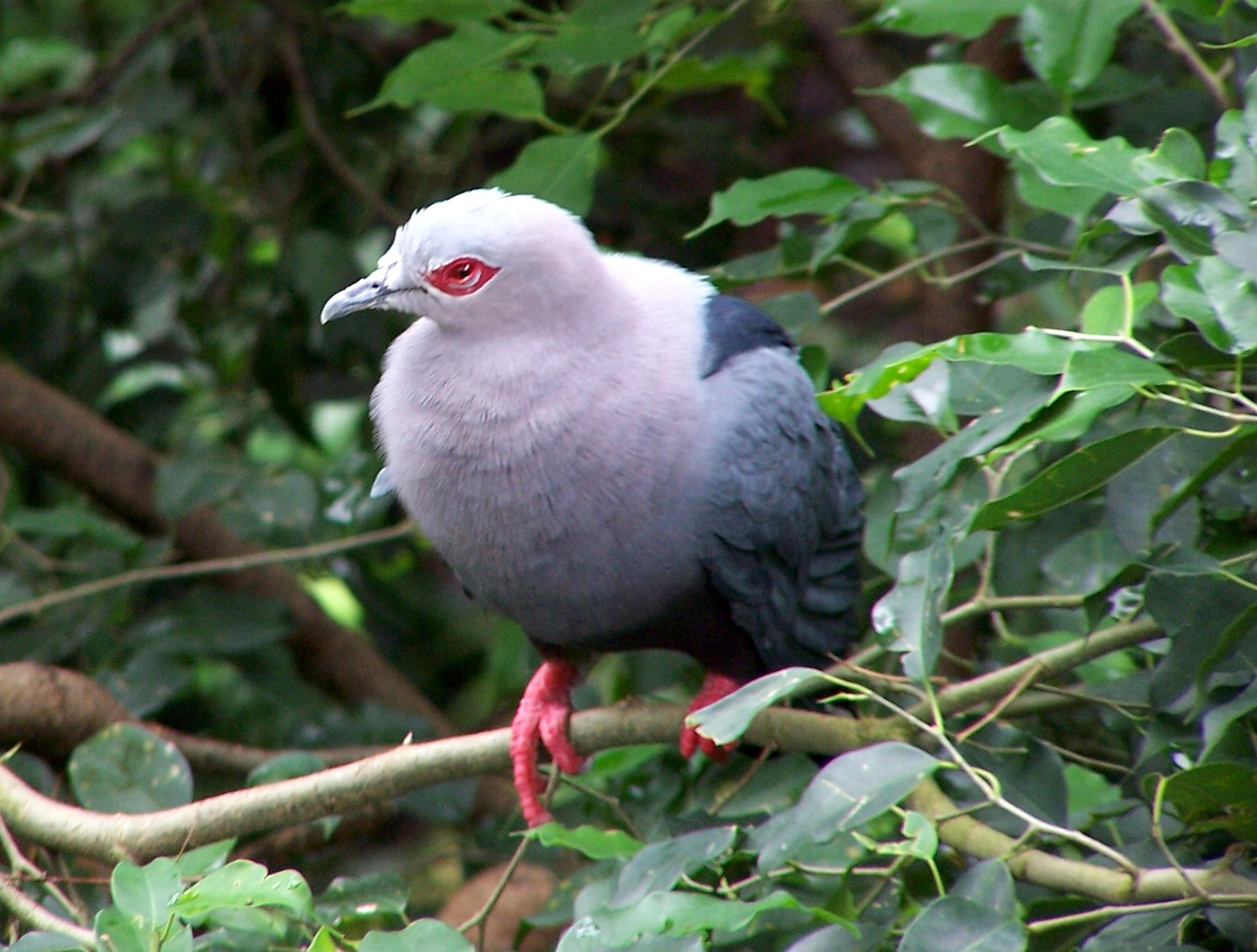

Conservation status
- Least Concern (IUCN 3.1)

Scientific classification
- Kingdom: Animalia
- Phylum: Chordata
- Class: Aves
- Order: Columbiformes
- Family: Columbidae
- Genus: Ducula
- Species: D. pinon

Binomial name
- Ducula pinon (Gaimard, 1823)

= Pinon's imperial pigeon =

Species of bird

Pinon's imperial pigeon or Pinon imperial pigeon (Ducula pinon) is a species of bird in the family Columbidae. It is found in New Guinea. The species is named after Rose de Freycinet née Pinon. Several subspecies have been designated:

- Ducula pinon pinon (Quoy and Gaimard) - Western Papuan Islands; Aru Islands; southern New Guinea from the Mimika River to Hall Sound.
- Ducula pinon rubiensis (A. B. Meyer) - Geelvink Bay, New Guinea to Eatna Bay
- Ducula pinon jobiensis (Schlegel) - Jobi Island, northern coast of New Guinea; Dampier and Vulcan Islands.
- Ducula pinon salvadorii (Tristram) - D'Entrecasteaux Archipelago: Fergusson and Goodenough Islands; Louisiade Archipelago : St. Aignan, Rossel and Sudest Islands.

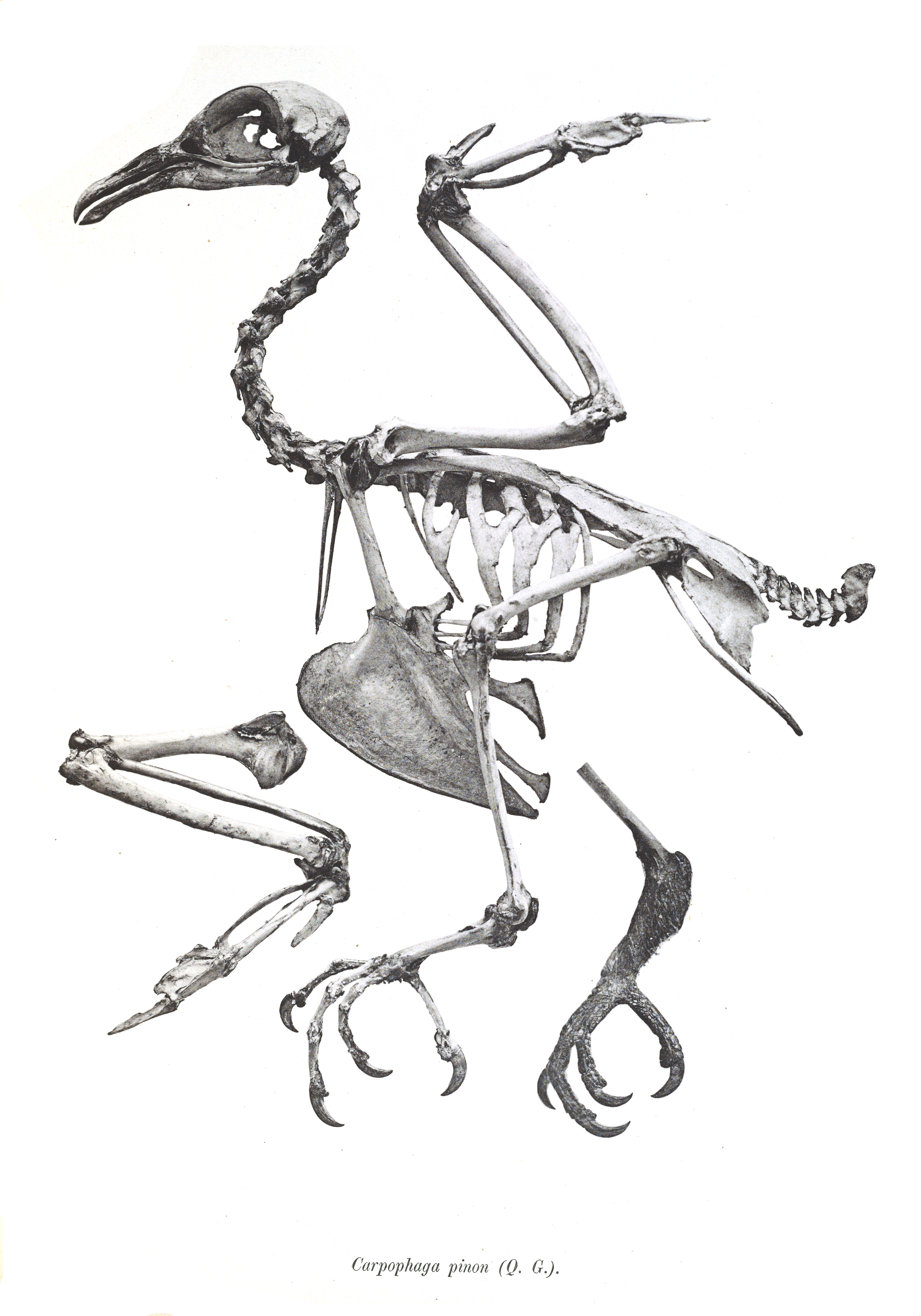
Skeleton

Its natural habitat is subtropical or tropical moist lowland forests.
