= List of wild pigeon species =

The International Ornithological Committee (IOC) accepts 352 species in family Columbidae, the pigeons and doves. They are distributed among 50 genera. This list is presented according to the IOC taxonomic sequence and can also be sorted alphabetically by common name and binomial. It includes 13 extinct species. For a list of domesticated breeds, see List of pigeon breeds.

The IOC breeding range descriptions use the following abbreviations for continents and other major geographic areas.

- AF: Africa
- AU: Australasia (New Guinea, Australia, New Zealand, the Solomon Islands, and the Bismarck Archipelago)
- EU: Eurasia (Europe and Asia to the Oriental Region boundary)
- IO: Indian Ocean
- MA: Middle America
- NA: North America
- OR: Oriental region (South Asia from Pakistan to Taiwan, southeast Asia, the Philippines, and Greater Sundas)
- PO: Polynesia (including Caroline and Mariana Islands)
- SA: South America

== List ==
IOC sequence	Common name	Binomial name + authority	Range	Image
1	Rock dove	Columba livia Gmelin, JF, 1789	Worldwide - widespread	
2	Hill pigeon	Columba rupestris Pallas, 1811	EU: China, Himalayas, and Central Asia	
3	Snow pigeon	Columba leuconota Vigors, 1831	EU: Altay, Tian Shan, Himalayas, and Central China	
4	Speckled pigeon	Columba guinea Linnaeus, 1758	AF: Sub-Saharan Africa	
5	White-collared pigeon	Columba albitorques Rüppell, 1837	AF: Eritrea and Ethiopia	
6	Stock dove	Columba oenas Linnaeus, 1758	EU: Europe and central Asia	
7	Yellow-eyed pigeon	Columba eversmanni Bonaparte, 1856	EU: Central Asia and western China	
8	Somali pigeon	Columba oliviae Clarke, S, 1918	AF: northeastern Somalia	
9	Common wood pigeon	Columba palumbus Linnaeus, 1758	EU: Europe to China	
10	Trocaz pigeon	Columba trocaz Heineken, 1829	AF: Madeira	
11	Bolle's pigeon	Columba bollii Godman, 1872	AF: Canary Islands	
12	Laurel pigeon	Columba junoniae Hartert, EJO, 1916	AF: Canary Islands	
13	Afep pigeon	Columba unicincta Cassin, 1860	AF: Equatorial Africa	
14	African olive pigeon	Columba arquatrix Temminck, 1808	AF: mainly eastern and southern Africa	
15	Cameroon olive pigeon	Columba sjostedti Reichenow, 1901	AF: western Cameroon and eastern Nigeria	
16	Sao Tome olive pigeon	Columba thomensis Barboza du Bocage, 1888	AF: São Tomé	
17	Comoro olive pigeon	Columba pollenii Schlegel, 1865	AF: Comoros	
18	Speckled wood pigeon	Columba hodgsonii Vigors, 1832	OR: Himalayas, Myanmar, and Central China	
19	White-naped pigeon	Columba albinucha Sassi, 1911	AF: Central Africa and Albertine Rift	
20	Ashy wood pigeon	Columba pulchricollis Blyth, 1846	OR: Eastern Himalaya, Yunnan, Myanmar, and Taiwan	
21	Nilgiri wood pigeon	Columba elphinstonii (Sykes, 1832)	OR: Western Ghats (India)	
22	Sri Lanka wood pigeon	Columba torringtoniae (Kelaart, 1853)	OR: Sri Lanka	
23	Pale-capped pigeon	Columba punicea Blyth, 1842	OR: northeast India through southeast Asia	
24	Silvery pigeon	Columba argentina Bonaparte, 1855 (possibly extinct)	OR: western Malaysia	
25	Andaman wood pigeon	Columba palumboides (Hume, 1873)	OR: Andaman and Nicobar Islands	
26	Japanese wood pigeon	Columba janthina Temminck, 1830	EU: East China Sea	
27	Bonin wood pigeon	Columba versicolor Kittlitz, 1832 (extinct)	EU: Bonin Islands	
28	Ryukyu wood pigeon	Columba jouyi (Stejneger, 1887) (extinct)	EU: Daitō and Okinawa Islands	
29	Metallic pigeon	Columba vitiensis Quoy & Gaimard, 1832	OR, AU: Melanesia, Philippines, and Wallacea	
30	White-headed pigeon	Columba leucomela Temminck, 1821	AU: eastern Australia	
31	Yellow-legged pigeon	Columba pallidiceps (Ramsay, EP, 1878)	AU: Bismarck and Solomon archipelagos	
32	Eastern bronze-naped pigeon	Columba delegorguei Delegorgue, 1847	AF: east Africa	
33	Western bronze-naped pigeon	Columba iriditorques Cassin, 1856	AF: Equatorial Africa	
34	Island bronze-naped pigeon	Columba malherbii Verreaux, J & Verreaux, É, 1851	AF: Gulf of Guinea islands	
35	Lemon dove	Columba larvata Temminck, 1809	AF: Sub-Saharan Africa	
36	Passenger pigeon	Ectopistes migratorius (Linnaeus, 1766) (extinct)	NA: central and eastern USA and Canada	
37	White-crowned pigeon	Patagioenas leucocephala (Linnaeus, 1758)	NA, MA: Florida, West Indies, eastern Caribbean	
38	Scaly-naped pigeon	Patagioenas squamosa (Bonnaterre, 1792)	NA: West Indies	
39	Scaled pigeon	Patagioenas speciosa (Gmelin, JF, 1789)	MA, SA: Central and South America	
40	Picazuro pigeon	Patagioenas picazuro (Temminck, 1813)	SA: eastern South America	
41	Bare-eyed pigeon	Patagioenas corensis (Jacquin, 1784)	SA: Colombia, Venezuela, and Netherlands Antilles	
42	Spot-winged pigeon	Patagioenas maculosa (Temminck, 1813)	SA: South America	
43	Band-tailed pigeon	Patagioenas fasciata (Say, 1822)	NA, MA, SA: western and mountainous Americas	
44	Chilean pigeon	Patagioenas araucana (Lesson, RP & Garnot, 1827)	SA: Chile and western Argentina	
45	Ring-tailed pigeon	Patagioenas caribaea (Jacquin, 1784)	NA: Jamaica	
46	Pale-vented pigeon	Patagioenas cayennensis (Bonnaterre, 1792)	MA, SA: Mexico into South America	
47	Red-billed pigeon	Patagioenas flavirostris (Wagler, 1831)	NA, MA: southern Texas to Costa Rica	
48	Maranon pigeon	Patagioenas oenops (Salvin, 1895)	SA: Ecuador and Peru	
49	Plain pigeon	Patagioenas inornata (Vigors, 1827)	NA: Greater Antilles	
50	Plumbeous pigeon	Patagioenas plumbea (Vieillot, 1818)	SA: Colombia to southeastern Brazil	
51	Ruddy pigeon	Patagioenas subvinacea (Lawrence, 1868)	MA, SA: southern Central and northern South America	
52	Short-billed pigeon	Patagioenas nigrirostris (Sclater, PL, 1860)	MA, SA: Mexico to Colombia	
53	Dusky pigeon	Patagioenas goodsoni (Hartert, EJO, 1902)	SA: Tumbes-Chocó-Magdalena	
54	Malagasy turtle dove	Nesoenas picturatus (Temminck, 1813)	AF: Madagascar, Seychelles, Mauritius	
55	Rodrigues pigeon	Nesoenas rodericanus (Milne-Edwards, 1873) (extinct)	IO: Rodrigues Island	
56	Pink pigeon	Nesoenas mayeri (Prévost, 1843)	IO: Mauritius Island	
57	European turtle dove	Streptopelia turtur (Linnaeus, 1758)	EU: primarily Europe; to North Africa and China	
58	Dusky turtle dove	Streptopelia lugens (Rüppell, 1837)	AF, EU: east Africa and Arabian Peninsula	
59	Adamawa turtle dove	Streptopelia hypopyrrha (Reichenow, 1910)	AF: West Africa	
60	Oriental turtle dove	Streptopelia orientalis (Latham, 1790)	EU, OR: widespread	
61	Sunda collared dove	Streptopelia bitorquata (Temminck, 1809)	OR, AU: Java and Lesser Sundas to Timor	
62	Philippine collared dove	Streptopelia dusumieri (Temminck, 1823)	OR: Philippines and Sunda Archipelago	
63	Eurasian collared dove	Streptopelia decaocto (Frivaldszky, 1838)	EU, OR: native from Europe to China; widely introduced elsewhere	
64	Burmese collared dove	Streptopelia xanthocycla (Newman, TH, 1906)	OR: central Myanmar	
65	African collared dove	Streptopelia roseogrisea (Sundevall, 1857)	AF: Sub-Saharan Africa	
66	White-winged collared dove	Streptopelia reichenowi (Erlanger, 1901)	AF: Horn of Africa	
67	Mourning collared dove	Streptopelia decipiens (Hartlaub & Finsch, 1870)	AF: Sub-Saharan Africa	
68	Red-eyed dove	Streptopelia semitorquata (Rüppell, 1837)	AF, EU: Sub-Saharan Africa and Arabian Peninsula	
69	Ring-necked dove	Streptopelia capicola (Sundevall, 1857)	AF: Sub-Saharan Africa, Comoros	
70	Vinaceous dove	Streptopelia vinacea (Gmelin, JF, 1789)	AF: Sub-Saharan Africa	
71	Red collared dove	Streptopelia tranquebarica (Hermann, 1804)	OR: eastern and southern Asia	
72	Spotted dove	Spilopelia chinensis (Scopoli, 1786)	OR: eastern and southern Asia	
73	Laughing dove	Spilopelia senegalensis (Linnaeus, 1766)	AF, EU, OR: Africa, the Middle East, and southern Asia	
74	Barred cuckoo-dove	Macropygia unchall (Wagler, 1827)	OR: eastern Himalaya, southern China, and southeast Asia	
75	Amboyna cuckoo-dove	Macropygia amboinensis (Linnaeus, 1766)	AU: Moluccas to New Guinea	
76	Sultan's cuckoo-dove	Macropygia doreya Bonaparte, 1854	AU: Moluccas to New Guinea	
77	Ruddy cuckoo-dove	Macropygia emiliana Bonaparte, 1854	OR: Indonesia	
78	Enggano cuckoo-dove	Macropygia cinnamomea Salvadori, 1892	OR: Enggano Island (off western Sumatra)	
79	Barusan cuckoo-dove	Macropygia modiglianii Salvadori, 1887	OR: western Sumatran islands (except Enggano)	
80	Timor cuckoo-dove	Macropygia magna Wallace, 1864	AU: Timor and eastern Lesser Sundas	
81	Tanimbar cuckoo-dove	Macropygia timorlaoensis Meyer, AB, 1884	AU: Tanimbar Islands	
82	Flores Sea cuckoo-dove	Macropygia macassariensis Wallace, 1865	AU: Sulawesi and Lesser Sundas	
83	Philippine cuckoo-dove	Macropygia tenuirostris Bonaparte, 1854	OR: Philippines	
84	Brown cuckoo-dove	Macropygia phasianella (Temminck, 1821)	AU: eastern Australia	
85	Andaman cuckoo-dove	Macropygia rufipennis Blyth, 1846	OR: Andaman and Nicobar Islands	
86	Bar-tailed cuckoo-dove	Macropygia nigrirostris Salvadori, 1876	AU: New Guinea and Bismarck Archipelago	
87	Spot-breasted cuckoo-dove	Macropygia mackinlayi Ramsay, EP, 1878	AU: Melanesia	
88	Little cuckoo-dove	Macropygia ruficeps (Temminck, 1835)	OR: Myanmar to Lesser Sundas	
89	Great cuckoo-dove	Reinwardtoena reinwardti (Temminck, 1824)	AU: Moluccas and New Guinea	
90	Pied cuckoo-dove	Reinwardtoena browni (Sclater, PL, 1877)	AU: Bismarck Archipelago and Admiralty Islands	
91	Crested cuckoo-dove	Reinwardtoena crassirostris (Gould, 1856)	AU: Solomon Islands	
92	White-faced cuckoo-dove	Turacoena manadensis (Quoy & Gaimard, 1832)	AU: Sulawesi	
93	Sula cuckoo-dove	Turacoena sulaensis Forbes, HO & Robinson, 1900	AU: Sula Islands and Banggai Archipelago	
94	Black cuckoo-dove	Turacoena modesta (Temminck, 1835)	AU: Lesser Sundas	
95	Emerald-spotted wood dove	Turtur chalcospilos (Wagler, 1827)	AF: eastern and southern Africa	
96	Black-billed wood dove	Turtur abyssinicus (Sharpe, 1902)	AF: Sub-Saharan belt	
97	Blue-spotted wood dove	Turtur afer (Linnaeus, 1766)	AF: Sub-Saharan Africa	
98	Tambourine dove	Turtur tympanistria (Temminck, 1809)	AF: Sub-Saharan Africa, Comoros	
99	Blue-headed wood dove	Turtur brehmeri (Hartlaub, 1865)	AF: Equatorial Africa	
100	Namaqua dove	Oena capensis (Linnaeus, 1766)	AF: Sub-Saharan Africa, Arabian Peninsula, and Madagascar	
101	Common emerald dove	Chalcophaps indica (Linnaeus, 1758)	OR, AU: southern China to New Guinea	
102	Pacific emerald dove	Chalcophaps longirostris Gould, 1848	AU: Australasia	
103	Stephan's emerald dove	Chalcophaps stephani Reichenbach, 1851	AU: Sulawesi, New Guinea, and Solomon Islands	
104	New Guinea bronzewing	Henicophaps albifrons Gray, GR, 1862	AU: New Guinea	
105	New Britain bronzewing	Henicophaps foersteri Rothschild & Hartert, EJO, 1906	AU: Bismarck Archipelago	
106	Common bronzewing	Phaps chalcoptera (Latham, 1790)	AU: Australia	
107	Brush bronzewing	Phaps elegans (Temminck, 1809)	AU: southern Australia	
108	Flock bronzewing	Phaps histrionica (Gould, 1841)	AU: Australia	
109	Crested pigeon	Ocyphaps lophotes (Temminck, 1822)	AU: Australia	
110	Spinifex pigeon	Geophaps plumifera Gould, 1842	AU: Australia	
111	Squatter pigeon	Geophaps scripta (Temminck, 1821)	AU: northeast Australia	
112	Partridge pigeon	Geophaps smithii (Jardine & Selby, 1830)	AU: northern Australia	
113	Thick-billed ground pigeon	Trugon terrestris Gray, GR, 1849	AU: New Guinea	
114	Wonga pigeon	Leucosarcia melanoleuca (Latham, 1801)	AU: eastern Australia	
115	Chestnut-quilled rock pigeon	Petrophassa rufipennis Collett, 1898	AU: northern Australia	
116	White-quilled rock pigeon	Petrophassa albipennis Gould, 1841	AU: north-western Australia	
117	Diamond dove	Geopelia cuneata (Latham, 1801)	AU: Australia	
118	Zebra dove	Geopelia striata (Linnaeus, 1766)	OR: Malay Peninsula, Sumatra, and Java	
119	Peaceful dove	Geopelia placida Gould, 1844	AU: Australia and New Guinea	
120	Barred dove	Geopelia maugeus (Temminck, 1809)	AU: Lesser Sundas and Moluccas	
121	Bar-shouldered dove	Geopelia humeralis (Temminck, 1821)	AU: Australia and New Guinea	
122	Inca dove	Columbina inca (Lesson, RP, 1847)	NA, MA: southwestern USA to Costa Rica	
123	Scaled dove	Columbina squammata (Lesson, RP, 1831)	SA: northern and eastern South America	
124	Common ground dove	Columbina passerina (Linnaeus, 1758)	NA, MA, SA: southern USA into Brazil	
125	Plain-breasted ground dove	Columbina minuta (Linnaeus, 1766)	MA, SA: southern Central America and northern South America	
126	Ecuadorian ground dove	Columbina buckleyi (Sclater, PL & Salvin, 1877)	SA: western Ecuador and northwestern Peru	
127	Ruddy ground dove	Columbina talpacoti (Temminck, 1810)	MA, SA: Mexico to Argentina	
128	Picui ground dove	Columbina picui (Temminck, 1813)	SA: Brazil to Chile and Argentina	
129	Croaking ground dove	Columbina cruziana (Prévost, 1842)	SA: northern Ecuador to Chile	
130	Blue-eyed ground dove	Columbina cyanopis (Pelzeln, 1870)	SA: Cerrado of Brazil	
131	Blue ground dove	Claravis pretiosa (Ferrari-Pérez, 1886)	MA, SA: Mexico to Argentina	
132	Purple-winged ground dove	Paraclaravis geoffroyi (Temminck, 1811)	SA: southern Atlantic Forest (Brazil to Argentina)	
133	Maroon-chested ground dove	Paraclaravis mondetoura (Bonaparte, 1856)	MA, SA: Mexico to Bolivia	
134	Bare-faced ground dove	Metriopelia ceciliae (Lesson, RP, 1845)	SA: Altiplano of Peru, Chile, and Argentina	
135	Moreno's ground dove	Metriopelia morenoi (Sharpe, 1902)	SA: Argentina	
136	Black-winged ground dove	Metriopelia melanoptera (Molina, 1782)	SA: Andes	
137	Golden-spotted ground dove	Metriopelia aymara (Prévost, 1840)	SA: Altiplano of Peru, Chile, and Argentina	
138	Long-tailed ground dove	Uropelia campestris (Spix, 1825)	SA: Brazil and Bolivia	
139	Blue-headed quail-dove	Starnoenas cyanocephala (Linnaeus, 1758)	NA: Cuba	
140	Purple quail-dove	Geotrygon purpurata (Salvin, 1878)	SA: northwestern Colombia to northwestern Ecuador	
141	Sapphire quail-dove	Geotrygon saphirina Bonaparte, 1855	SA: western Amazon Basin	
142	Crested quail-dove	Geotrygon versicolor (Lafresnaye, 1846)	NA: Jamaica	
143	Ruddy quail-dove	Geotrygon montana (Linnaeus, 1758)	MA, SA: Central America and northern South America	
144	Violaceous quail-dove	Geotrygon violacea (Temminck, 1809)	MA, SA: southern Central America and northern South America	
145	Grey-fronted quail-dove	Geotrygon caniceps (Gundlach, 1852)	NA: Cuba	
146	White-fronted quail-dove	Geotrygon leucometopia (Chapman, 1917)	NA: Hispaniola	
147	Key West quail-dove	Geotrygon chrysia Bonaparte, 1855	NA: northern Caribbean	
148	Bridled quail-dove	Geotrygon mystacea (Temminck, 1811)	NA: Puerto Rico, Virgin Islands, and northern Lesser Antilles	
149	Olive-backed quail-dove	Leptotrygon veraguensis (Lawrence, 1866)	MA, SA: Costa Rica to Ecuador	
150	White-tipped dove	Leptotila verreauxi Bonaparte, 1855	NA, MA, SA: southern Texas to Argentina	
151	Yungas dove	Leptotila megalura Sclater, PL & Salvin, 1879	SA: Bolivia and Argentina	
152	Grey-fronted dove	Leptotila rufaxilla (Richard & Bernard, 1792)	SA: Colombia to Argentina	
153	Grey-headed dove	Leptotila plumbeiceps Sclater, PL & Salvin, 1868	MA, SA: Mexico to Colombia	
154	Pallid dove	Leptotila pallida Berlepsch & Taczanowski, 1884	SA: western Colombia and Ecuador	
155	Azuero dove	Leptotila battyi Rothschild, 1901	MA: Panama	
156	Grenada dove	Leptotila wellsi (Lawrence, 1884)	NA: Grenada	
157	Caribbean dove	Leptotila jamaicensis (Linnaeus, 1766)	NA, MA: Cayman Islands, Jamaica, Yucatán Peninsula	
158	Grey-chested dove	Leptotila cassinii Lawrence, 1867	MA, SA: Guatemala to Colombia	
159	Ochre-bellied dove	Leptotila ochraceiventris Chapman, 1914	SA: Ecuador and Peru	
160	Tolima dove	Leptotila conoveri Bond, J & Meyer de Schauensee, 1943	SA: Colombian Andes	
161	Tuxtla quail-dove	Zentrygon carrikeri (Wetmore, 1941)	MA: southeastern Mexico	
162	Buff-fronted quail-dove	Zentrygon costaricensis (Lawrence, 1868)	MA: Costa Rica and Panama	
163	Purplish-backed quail-dove	Zentrygon lawrencii (Salvin, 1874)	MA: Costa Rica and Panama	
164	White-faced quail-dove	Zentrygon albifacies (Sclater, PL, 1858)	MA: Mexico to Nicaragua	
165	White-throated quail-dove	Zentrygon frenata (Tschudi, 1843)	SA: Andes from Colombia to northwestern Argentina	
166	Lined quail-dove	Zentrygon linearis (Prévost, 1843)	SA: Colombia, Venezuela, and Trinidad and Tobago	
167	Chiriqui quail-dove	Zentrygon chiriquensis (Sclater, PL, 1856)	MA: Costa Rica and Panama	
168	Russet-crowned quail-dove	Zentrygon goldmani (Nelson, 1912)	MA, SA: Panama and Colombia	
169	Mourning dove	Zenaida macroura (Linnaeus, 1758)	NA, MA: North America to Panama	
170	Socorro dove	Zenaida graysoni (Lawrence, 1871)	MA: Soccoro Island (Mexico)	
171	Eared dove	Zenaida auriculata (des Murs, 1847)	SA: South America	
172	Zenaida dove	Zenaida aurita (Temminck, 1809)	NA: West Indies and Yucatán Peninsula	
173	Galápagos dove	Zenaida galapagoensis Gould, 1841	SA: Galápagos Islands	
174	White-winged dove	Zenaida asiatica (Linnaeus, 1758)	NA, MA: southwestern USA to Panama; Greater Antilles	
175	West Peruvian dove	Zenaida meloda (Tschudi, 1843)	SA: South American west coast	
176	Nicobar pigeon	Caloenas nicobarica (Linnaeus, 1758)	OR, AU: Andaman Islands to Philippines and Solomon Islands	
177	Spotted green pigeon	Caloenas maculata (Gmelin, JF, 1789) (extinct)	South Pacific or Indian Ocean island(?)	
178	Sulawesi ground dove	Gallicolumba tristigmata (Bonaparte, 1855)	AU: Sulawesi	
179	Cinnamon ground dove	Gallicolumba rufigula (Pucheran, 1853)	AU: New Guinea	
180	Luzon bleeding-heart	Gallicolumba luzonica (Scopoli, 1786)	OR: Luzon (Philippines)	
181	Mindanao bleeding-heart	Gallicolumba crinigera (Reichenbach, 1851)	OR: Philippines	
182	Mindoro bleeding-heart	Gallicolumba platenae (Salvadori, 1893)	OR: primarily Mindoro (Philippines)	
183	Negros bleeding-heart	Gallicolumba keayi (Clarke, WE, 1900)	OR: primarily Negros (Philippines)	
184	Sulu bleeding-heart	Gallicolumba menagei (Bourns & Worcester, 1894)	OR: Sulu (Philippines)	
185	Wetar ground dove	Pampusana hoedtii (Schlegel, 1871)	OR: Wetar and Timor	
186	White-breasted ground dove	Pampusana jobiensis (Meyer, AB, 1875)	AU: New Guinea, Bismarck Archipelago, and Solomon Islands	
187	White-fronted ground dove	Pampusana kubaryi (Finsch, 1880)	PO: Caroline Islands	
188	Polynesian ground dove	Pampusana erythroptera (Gmelin, JF, 1789)	PO: Tuamotu Archipelago	
189	White-throated ground dove	Pampusana xanthonura (Temminck, 1823)	PO: Mariana and Caroline Islands	
190	Norfolk ground dove	Pampusana norfolkensis (Forshaw, 2015) (extinct)	PO: Norfolk Island	
191	Shy ground dove	Pampusana stairi (Gray, GR, 1856)	PO: Tonga and neighboring islands	
192	Santa Cruz ground dove	Pampusana sanctaecrucis (Mayr, 1935)	AU: southern Solomon Islands and Vanuatu	
193	Tanna ground dove	Pampusana ferruginea (Forster, JR, 1844) (extinct)	PO: Tanna Islands (Vanuatu)	
194	Thick-billed ground dove	Pampusana salamonis (Ramsay, EP, 1882) (extinct)	AU: Makira and Ramos (Solomon Islands)	
195	Marquesan ground dove	Pampusana rubescens (Vieillot, 1818)	PO: Marquesas Islands	
196	Bronze ground dove	Pampusana beccarii (Salvadori, 1876)	AU: New Guinea, Bismarck Archipelago, and Solomon Islands	
197	Palau ground dove	Pampusana canifrons (Hartlaub & Finsch, 1872)	AU: Palau	
198	Choiseul pigeon	Microgoura meeki Rothschild, 1904 (extinct)	AU: Choiseul (Solomon Islands)	
199	Pheasant pigeon	Otidiphaps nobilis Gould, 1870	AU: New Guinea	
200	Western crowned pigeon	Goura cristata (Pallas, 1764)	AU: western New Guinea	
201	Scheepmaker's crowned pigeon	Goura scheepmakeri Finsch, 1876	AU: southeastern New Guinea	
202	Sclater's crowned pigeon	Goura sclaterii Salvadori, 1876	AU: southern New Guinea	
203	Victoria crowned pigeon	Goura victoria (Fraser, 1844)	AU: northern New Guinea	
204	Dodo	Raphus cucullatus (Linnaeus, 1758) (extinct)	IO: Mauritius Island	
205	Rodrigues solitaire	Pezophaps solitaria (Gmelin, JF, 1789) (extinct)	IO: Rodrigues Island	
206	Tooth-billed pigeon	Didunculus strigirostris (Jardine, 1845)	PO: Samoa	
207	White-eared brown dove	Phapitreron leucotis (Temminck, 1823)	OR: Philippines	
208	Amethyst brown dove	Phapitreron amethystinus Bonaparte, 1855	OR: Philippines	
209	Tawitawi brown dove	Phapitreron cinereiceps (Bourns & Worcester, 1894)	OR: Tawi-Tawi Islands (Philippines)	
210	Mindanao brown dove	Phapitreron brunneiceps (Bourns & Worcester, 1894)	OR: Mindanao and Basilan (Philippines)	
211	Cinnamon-headed green pigeon	Treron fulvicollis (Wagler, 1827)	OR: Malay Peninsula to Borneo	
212	Little green pigeon	Treron olax (Temminck, 1823)	OR: Malay Peninsula and Greater Sundas	
213	Pink-necked green pigeon	Treron vernans (Linnaeus, 1771)	OR: Southeast Asia mainland to Philippines and Sulawesi	
214	Orange-breasted green pigeon	Treron bicinctus (Jerdon, 1840)	OR: south and southeast Asia to Bali	
215	Sri Lanka green pigeon	Treron pompadora (Gmelin, JF, 1789)	OR: Sri Lanka	
216	Grey-fronted green pigeon	Treron affinis (Jerdon, 1840)	OR: southern India	
217	Ashy-headed green pigeon	Treron phayrei (Blyth, 1862)	OR: Himalayas to Southeast Asia	
218	Andaman green pigeon	Treron chloropterus Blyth, 1845	OR: Andaman and Nicobar Islands	
219	Philippine green pigeon	Treron axillaris (Bonaparte, 1855)	OR: Philippines	
220	Buru green pigeon	Treron aromaticus (Gmelin, JF, 1789)	OR: Buru Island (Indonesia)	
221	Thick-billed green pigeon	Treron curvirostra (Gmelin, JF, 1789)	OR: Nepal to Philippines and Borneo	
222	Grey-cheeked green pigeon	Treron griseicauda Bonaparte, 1855	OR: Sulawesi, Java, and Bali (Indonesia)	
223	Sumba green pigeon	Treron teysmannii Schlegel, 1879	AU: Sumba (Indonesia)	
224	Flores green pigeon	Treron floris Wallace, 1864	AU: Lesser Sundas	
225	Timor green pigeon	Treron psittaceus (Temminck, 1808)	AU: Timor (Indonesia)	
226	Large green pigeon	Treron capellei (Temminck, 1822)	OR: Malay Peninsula to Borneo and Java	
227	Yellow-footed green pigeon	Treron phoenicopterus (Latham, 1790)	OR: Pakistan to Southeast Asia	
228	Bruce's green pigeon	Treron waalia (Meyer, FAA, 1793)	AF, EU: Sub-Saharan belt and Arabian Peninsula	
229	Madagascar green pigeon	Treron australis (Linnaeus, 1771)	AF: Madagascar	
230	Comoro green pigeon	Treron griveaudi Benson, 1960	AF: Comoros	
231	African green pigeon	Treron calvus (Temminck, 1811)	AF: Sub-Saharan Africa	
232	Pemba green pigeon	Treron pembaensis Pakenham, 1940	AF: Pemba Island (Tanzania)	
233	Sao Tome green pigeon	Treron sanctithomae (Gmelin, JF, 1789)	AF: São Tomé	
234	Pin-tailed green pigeon	Treron apicauda Blyth, 1846	OR: Himalayas to Southeast Asia	
235	Sumatran green pigeon	Treron oxyurus (Temminck, 1823)	OR: Sumatra and Java	
236	Yellow-vented green pigeon	Treron seimundi (Robinson, 1910)	OR: Laos, Vietnam, and Malay Peninsula	
237	Wedge-tailed green pigeon	Treron sphenurus (Vigors, 1832)	OR: Himalayas to Bali and Lombok	
238	White-bellied green pigeon	Treron sieboldii (Temminck, 1835)	EU, OR: Japan to Southeast Asia	
239	Ryukyu green pigeon	Treron permagnus Stejneger, 1887	OR: Ryukyu Islands of Japan	
240	Taiwan green pigeon	Treron formosae Swinhoe, 1863	OR: Taiwan and northern Philippines	
241	Banded fruit dove	Ptilinopus cinctus (Temminck, 1809)	AU: Bali and Lesser Sundas	
242	Black-banded fruit dove	Ptilinopus alligator Collett, 1898	AU: northern Australia	
243	Red-naped fruit dove	Ptilinopus dohertyi Rothschild, 1896	OR: Sumba (Indonesia)	
244	Pink-headed fruit dove	Ptilinopus porphyreus (Temminck, 1822)	OR: Sumatra and Java	
245	Flame-breasted fruit dove	Ptilinopus marchei Oustalet, 1880	OR: Luzon (Philippines)	
246	Cream-breasted fruit dove	Ptilinopus merrilli (McGregor, 1916)	OR: northern Philippines	
247	Yellow-breasted fruit dove	Ptilinopus occipitalis Gray, GR, 1844	OR: Philippines	
248	Red-eared fruit dove	Ptilinopus fischeri Brüggemann, 1876	OR: Sulawesi	
249	Jambu fruit dove	Ptilinopus jambu (Gmelin, JF, 1789)	OR: Malay Peninsula and Greater Sundas	
250	Maroon-chinned fruit dove	Ptilinopus subgularis Meyer, AB & Wiglesworth, 1896	AU: Banggai Islands (Indonesia)	
251	Oberholser's fruit dove	Ptilinopus gularis (Quoy & Gaimard, 1832)	AU: Sulawesi	
252	Sula fruit dove	Ptilinopus mangoliensis Rothschild, 1898	AU: Sula Islands (Indonesia)	
253	Black-chinned fruit dove	Ptilinopus leclancheri (Bonaparte, 1855)	OR: Philippines and Taiwan	
254	Scarlet-breasted fruit dove	Ptilinopus bernsteinii Schlegel, 1863	AU: northern Moluccas	
255	Wompoo fruit dove	Ptilinopus magnificus (Temminck, 1821)	AU: New Guinea and Queensland	
256	Pink-spotted fruit dove	Ptilinopus perlatus (Temminck, 1835)	AU: New Guinea	
257	Ornate fruit dove	Ptilinopus ornatus Schlegel, 1871	AU: New Guinea	
258	Tanna fruit dove	Ptilinopus tannensis (Latham, 1790)	AU: Vanuatu	
259	Orange-fronted fruit dove	Ptilinopus aurantiifrons Gray, GR, 1858	AU: New Guinea	
260	Wallace's fruit dove	Ptilinopus wallacii Gray, GR, 1858	AU: Wallacea	
261	Superb fruit dove	Ptilinopus superbus (Temminck, 1809)	AU: Moluccas, Melanesia, and northeastern Australia	
262	Many-colored fruit dove	Ptilinopus perousii Peale, 1849	PO: Fiji, Tonga, and Samoa	
263	Crimson-crowned fruit dove	Ptilinopus porphyraceus (Temminck, 1821)	PO: Fiji, Tonga, and Samoa	
264	Purple-capped fruit dove	Ptilinopus ponapensis Finsch, 1878	PO: Chuuk and Pohnpei (Caroline Islands)	
265	Kosrae fruit dove	Ptilinopus hernsheimi Finsch, 1880	PO: Kosrae (Caroline Islands)	
266	Palau fruit dove	Ptilinopus pelewensis Hartlaub & Finsch, 1868	PO: Palau	
267	Lilac-crowned fruit dove	Ptilinopus rarotongensis Hartlaub & Finsch, 1871	PO: Cook Islands	
268	Mariana fruit dove	Ptilinopus roseicapilla (Lesson, RP, 1831)	PO: Guam and northern Marianas	
269	Rose-crowned fruit dove	Ptilinopus regina Swainson, 1825	AU: Lesser Sundas and Australia	
270	Silver-capped fruit dove	Ptilinopus richardsii Ramsay, EP, 1882	AU: Solomon Islands	
271	Raiatea fruit-dove	Ptilinopus chrysogaster Gray, GR, 1854	PO: western Society Islands	
272	Grey-green fruit dove	Ptilinopus purpuratus (Gmelin, JF, 1789)	PO: eastern Society Islands	
273	Makatea fruit dove	Ptilinopus chalcurus Gray, GR, 1860	PO: Tuamotus	
274	Atoll fruit dove	Ptilinopus coralensis Peale, 1849	PO: Tuamotus	
275	Red-bellied fruit dove	Ptilinopus greyi Bonaparte, 1857	AU: Solomon Islands to New Caledonia	
276	Rapa fruit dove	Ptilinopus huttoni Finsch, 1874	PO: Rapa Iti	
277	White-capped fruit dove	Ptilinopus dupetithouarsii (Néboux, 1840)	PO: Marquesas Islands	
278	Red-moustached fruit dove	Ptilinopus mercierii (des Murs & Prévost, 1849) (extinct)	PO: Marquesas Islands	
279	Henderson fruit dove	Ptilinopus insularis North, 1908	PO: Henderson Island (Pitcairn Islands)	
280	Coroneted fruit dove	Ptilinopus coronulatus Gray, GR, 1858	AU: New Guinea	
281	Beautiful fruit dove	Ptilinopus pulchellus (Temminck, 1835)	AU: New Guinea	
282	Blue-capped fruit dove	Ptilinopus monacha (Temminck, 1824)	AU: northern Moluccas	
283	White-bibbed fruit dove	Ptilinopus rivoli (Prévost, 1843)	AU: Moluccas to Bismarck Archipelago	
284	Geelvink fruit dove	Ptilinopus speciosus Schlegel, 1871	AU: islands in Geelvink Bay, New Guinea	
285	Yellow-bibbed fruit dove	Ptilinopus solomonensis Gray, GR, 1870	AU: New Guinea, Bismarck Archipelago, and New Britain	
286	Claret-breasted fruit dove	Ptilinopus viridis (Linnaeus, 1766)	AU: Moluccas, New Guinea, and Solomon Islands	
287	White-headed fruit dove	Ptilinopus eugeniae (Gould, 1856)	AU: Makira and neighboring islands (Solomon Islands)	
288	Orange-bellied fruit dove	Ptilinopus iozonus Gray, GR, 1858	AU: New Guinea	
289	Knob-billed fruit dove	Ptilinopus insolitus Schlegel, 1863	AU: Bismarck Archipelago	
290	Grey-headed fruit dove	Ptilinopus hyogastrus (Temminck, 1824)	AU: northern Moluccas	
291	Carunculated fruit dove	Ptilinopus granulifrons Hartert, EJO, 1898	AU: central Moluccas	
292	Black-naped fruit dove	Ptilinopus melanospilus (Salvadori, 1875)	OR, AU: Philippines to Sulawesi and Bali	
293	Dwarf fruit dove	Ptilinopus nainus (Temminck, 1835)	AU: New Guinea	
294	Negros fruit dove	Ptilinopus arcanus Ripley & Rabor, 1955	OR: Negros (Philippines)	
295	Orange dove	Ptilinopus victor (Gould, 1872)	PO: Fiji	
296	Golden dove	Ptilinopus luteovirens (Hombron & Jacquinot, 1841)	PO: Fiji	
297	Whistling dove	Ptilinopus layardi Elliot, DG, 1878	PO: Fiji	
298	Cloven-feathered dove	Drepanoptila holosericea (Temminck, 1809)	AU: New Caledonia	
299	Mauritius blue pigeon	Alectroenas nitidissima (Scopoli, 1786) (extinct)	IO: Mauritius Island	
300	Madagascar blue pigeon	Alectroenas madagascariensis (Linnaeus, 1766)	AF: Madagascar	
301	Comoro blue pigeon	Alectroenas sganzini (Bonaparte, 1854)	AF: Comoros and Aldabra	
302	Seychelles blue pigeon	Alectroenas pulcherrimus (Scopoli, 1786)	AF: Seychelles	
303	Pink-bellied imperial pigeon	Ducula poliocephala (Gray, GR, 1844)	OR: Philippines	
304	White-bellied imperial pigeon	Ducula forsteni (Bonaparte, 1854)	AU: Sulawesi	
305	Mindoro imperial pigeon	Ducula mindorensis (Whitehead, J, 1896)	OR, EU: Mindoro (Philippines)	
306	Grey-headed imperial pigeon	Ducula radiata (Quoy & Gaimard, 1832)	AU: Sulawesi	
307	Spotted imperial pigeon	Ducula carola (Bonaparte, 1854)	OR: Philippines	
308	Green imperial pigeon	Ducula aenea (Linnaeus, 1766)	OR: India to Philippines, Borneo, and Lesser Sundas	
309	Enggano imperial pigeon	Ducula oenothorax (Salvadori, 1892)	OR : Enggano (w of s Sumatra)	
310	Nicobar imperial pigeon	Ducula nicobarica (Pelzeln, 1865)	OR: Nicobar Islands	
311	Spectacled imperial pigeon	Ducula perspicillata (Temminck, 1824)	AU: Moluccas	
312	Seram imperial pigeon	Ducula neglecta (Schlegel, 1866)	AU: Seram Island	
313	Elegant imperial pigeon	Ducula concinna (Wallace, 1865)	AU: Wallacea	
314	Pacific imperial pigeon	Ducula pacifica (Gmelin, JF, 1789)	PO: Bismarck Archipelago to Cook Islands	
315	Micronesian imperial pigeon	Ducula oceanica (Desmarest, 1826)	PO: Micronesia	
316	Polynesian imperial pigeon	Ducula aurorae (Peale, 1849)	PO: French Polynesia	
317	Nuku Hiva imperial pigeon	Ducula galeata (Bonaparte, 1855)	PO: Nuku Hiva	
318	Red-knobbed imperial pigeon	Ducula rubricera (Bonaparte, 1854)	AU: Bismark Archipelago and Solomon Islands	
319	Spice imperial pigeon	Ducula myristicivora (Scopoli, 1786)	AU: Widi Island (northeast Moluccas) and western Papuan islands	
320	Geelvink imperial pigeon	Ducula geelvinkiana (Schlegel, 1873)	AU: islands in Geelvink Bay, New Guinea	
321	Purple-tailed imperial pigeon	Ducula rufigaster (Quoy & Gaimard, 1832)	AU: New Guinea	
322	Cinnamon-bellied imperial pigeon	Ducula basilica Bonaparte, 1854	AU: Moluccas	
323	Finsch's imperial pigeon	Ducula finschii (Ramsay, EP, 1882)	AU: Bismark Archipelago	
324	Rufescent imperial pigeon	Ducula chalconota (Salvadori, 1874)	AU: New Guinea	
325	Island imperial pigeon	Ducula pistrinaria Bonaparte, 1855	AU: Bismarck Archipelago and Solomon Islands	
326	Pink-headed imperial pigeon	Ducula rosacea (Temminck, 1836)	AU: Lesser Sundas	
327	Christmas imperial pigeon	Ducula whartoni (Sharpe, 1887)	OR: Christmas Island	
328	Grey imperial pigeon	Ducula pickeringii (Cassin, 1855)	OR: Borneo to Philippines	
329	Barking imperial pigeon	Ducula latrans (Peale, 1849)	PO: Fiji	
330	Chestnut-bellied imperial pigeon	Ducula brenchleyi (Gray, GR, 1870)	AU: Solomon Islands	
331	Vanuatu imperial pigeon	Ducula bakeri (Kinnear, 1928)	AU: Vanuatu	
332	Goliath imperial pigeon	Ducula goliath (Gray, GR, 1859)	AU: New Caledonia	
333	Pinon's imperial pigeon	Ducula pinon (Gaimard, 1823)	AU: New Guinea	
334	Black imperial pigeon	Ducula melanochroa (Sclater, PL, 1878)	AU: Bismarck Archipelago	
335	Collared imperial pigeon	Ducula mullerii (Temminck, 1835)	AU: Aru Islands and New Guinea	
336	Zoe's imperial pigeon	Ducula zoeae (Desmarest, 1826)	AU: New Guinea	
337	Malabar imperial pigeon	Ducula cuprea (Jerdon, 1840)	OR: southwestern India	
338	Mountain imperial pigeon	Ducula badia (Raffles, 1822)	OR: Himalayas to Java	
339	Dark-backed imperial pigeon	Ducula lacernulata (Temminck, 1822)	OR, AU: Java and Lesser Sundas	
340	Timor imperial pigeon	Ducula cineracea (Temminck, 1835)	AU: Timor and Wetar	
341	Pied imperial pigeon	Ducula bicolor (Scopoli, 1786)	OR: Southeast Asia to Philippines and New Guinea	
342	Silver-tipped imperial pigeon	Ducula luctuosa (Temminck, 1824)	OR: Sulawesi	
343	Torresian imperial pigeon	Ducula spilorrhoa (Gray, GR, 1858)	AU: Aru Islands, New Guinea, and Torres Strait Islands and northern Australia	
344	Yellowish imperial pigeon	Ducula subflavescens (Finsch, 1886)	AU: Bismarck Archipelago and Admiralty Islands	
345	Topknot pigeon	Lopholaimus antarcticus (Shaw, 1793)	AU: eastern Australia	
346	New Zealand pigeon	Hemiphaga novaeseelandiae (Gmelin, JF, 1789)	AU: New Zealand	
347	Chatham Islands pigeon	Hemiphaga chathamensis (Rothschild, 1891)	AU: Chatham Island	
348	Sombre pigeon	Cryptophaps poecilorrhoa (Brüggemann, 1876)	AU: Sulawesi	
349	Papuan mountain pigeon	Gymnophaps albertisii Salvadori, 1874	AU: Bacan Islands, New Guinea, and Bismarck Archipelago	
350	Buru mountain pigeon	Gymnophaps mada (Hartert, EJO, 1899)	AU: Buru Island (Indonesia)	
351	Seram mountain pigeon	Gymnophaps stalkeri (Ogilvie-Grant, 1911)	AU: Seram Island (Indonesia)	
352	Pale mountain pigeon	Gymnophaps solomonensis Mayr, 1931	AU: Solomon Islands	
