= Maroon-chinned fruit dove =

Maroon-chinned fruit dove has been split into 3 species:

- Banggai fruit dove, Ptilinopus subgularis
- Oberholser's fruit dove, Ptilinopus epius
- Sula fruit dove, Ptilinopus mangoliensis
