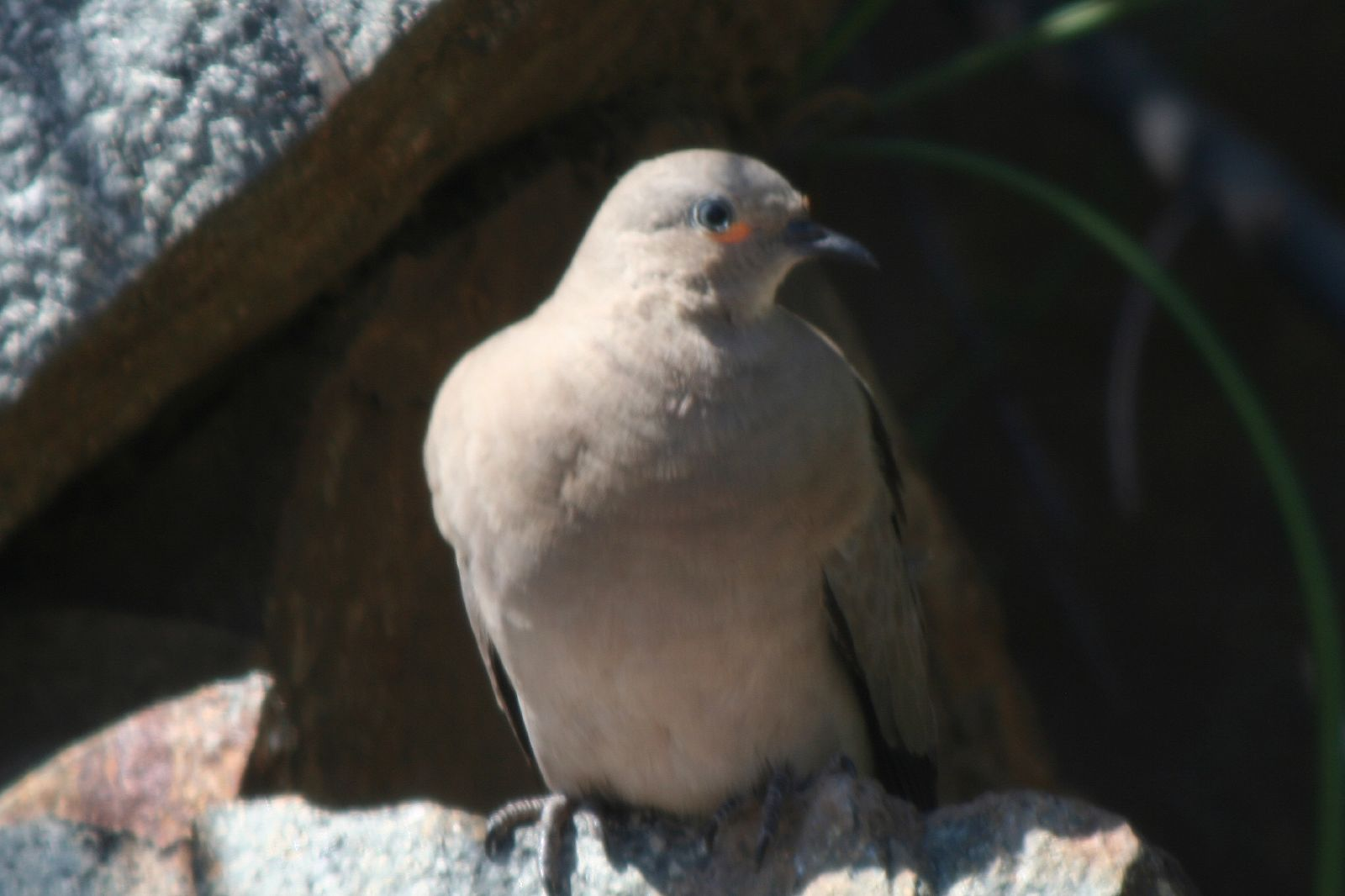
- Black-winged ground dove

Scientific classification
- Kingdom: Animalia
- Phylum: Chordata
- Class: Aves
- Order: Columbiformes
- Family: Columbidae
- Subfamily: Claravinae
- Genus: Metriopelia; Bonaparte, 1855

Type species
- Columba melanoptera Gmelin, 1789

Species
- See text

= Metriopelia =

Genus of birds

Metriopelia is a genus of ground doves containing four species that live in the dry, upland habitats along the Andean mountain chain in South America. They have large wings and three species have orange skin around the eyes.

The genus was introduced by the French naturalist Charles Lucien Bonaparte in 1855 with the black-winged ground dove (Metriopelia melanoptera) as the type species. The name of the genus combines the Ancient Greek metrios meaning "modest" with peleia meaning "dove".

The four species in the genus are:

Genus Metriopelia – Bonaparte, 1855 – four species
Common name	Scientific name and subspecies	Range	Size and ecology	IUCN status and estimated population
Bare-faced ground dove	Metriopelia ceciliae (Lesson, 1845)	Argentina, Bolivia, Chile, and Peru	Size: Habitat: Diet:	LC
Black-winged ground dove	Metriopelia melanoptera (Molina, 1782) Two subspecies: M. m. melanoptera; M. m. saturatior.	Argentina, Bolivia, Chile, Colombia, Ecuador, and Peru.	Size: Habitat: Diet:	LC
Golden-spotted ground dove	Metriopelia aymara (Prévost, 1840)	Argentina, Bolivia, Chile, and Peru	Size: Habitat: Diet:	LC
Moreno's ground dove	Metriopelia morenoi (Sharpe, 1902)	Argentina	Size: Habitat: Diet:	LC
