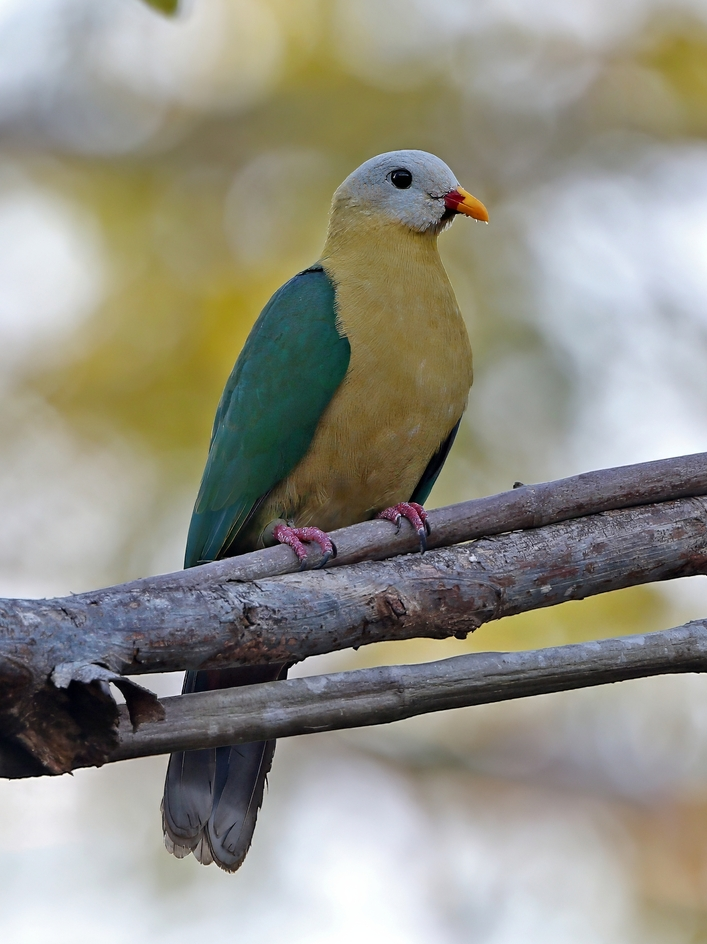
- Sula fruit dove Ramphiculus mangoliensis

Scientific classification
- Kingdom: Animalia
- Phylum: Chordata
- Class: Aves
- Order: Columbiformes
- Family: Columbidae
- Tribe: Ptilinopodini
- Genus: Ramphiculus; Bonaparte, 1854

Type species
- Ptilonopus occipitalis Gray, 1844

= Ramphiculus =

Genus of birds

Ramphiculus is a genus of fruit doves in the family Columbidae. They are restricted to the Philippines and Sulawesi apart from the Jambu fruit dove that occurs on the Malay Peninsula, Sumatra and Borneo, and the black-chinned fruit dove which extends north to Taiwan. These are colourful frugivorous doves that are found in forests and woodlands.

== Taxonomy ==
The genus Ramphiculus was introduced in 1854 by the French naturalist Charles Lucien Bonaparte who listed two species but did not specify a type species. In 1855 the English zoologist George Gray designated the type as Ptilonopus occipitalis Gray GR, 1844, the yellow-breasted fruit dove. The genus name is a diminutive of the Ancient Greek ῥαμφη/rhamphē meaning "bill".

The species placed in this genus were formerly placed in the genus Ptilinopus. A molecular genetic study published in 2014 found that the fruit dove genus Ptilinopus was paraphyletic. In a step towards creating monophyletic genera, two species were moved from Ptilinopus to Megaloprepia and nine species were moved from Ptilinopus to Ramphiculus.

== Species ==
The genus contains 9 species.

Image	Common name	Scientific name	Distribution
	Yellow-breasted fruit dove	Ramphiculus occipitalis	Philippines (except Palawan group and Sulu Archipelago)
	Flame-breasted fruit dove	Ramphiculus marchei	montane forest of Luzon (northern Philippines)
	Cream-bellied fruit dove	Ramphiculus merrilli	Luzon group (north Philippines)
	Red-eared fruit dove	Ramphiculus fischeri	montane Sulawesi
	Jambu fruit dove	Ramphiculus jambu	peninsular Thailand, Malay Peninsula, Sumatra, Borneo and western Java
	Oberholser's fruit dove	Ramphiculus gularis	lowland forest of Sulawesi
	Banggai fruit dove	Ramphiculus subgularis	Peleng and Banggai Islands, in Banggai Island (off eastern Sulawesi)
	Sula fruit dove	Ramphiculus mangoliensis	Sula Islands (Taliabu, Seho, and Mangole)
	Black-chinned fruit dove	Ramphiculus leclancheri	Philippines and Taiwan
