= Yellow-breasted fruit dove =

- Nominate subspecies

Conservation status
- Least Concern (IUCN 3.1)

Scientific classification
- Kingdom: Animalia
- Phylum: Chordata
- Class: Aves
- Order: Columbiformes
- Family: Columbidae
- Genus: Ramphiculus
- Species: R. occipitalis

Binomial name
- Ramphiculus occipitalis (G.R. Gray, 1844)

Synonyms
- Ptilinopus occipitalis

Species of bird

The yellow-breasted fruit dove (Ramphiculus occipitalis), known locally as balorinay, is a species of bird in the family Columbidae. It is endemic to the Philippines. Its natural habitat is tropical moist lowland forest. While it is listed as least concern in IUCN, it is declining due to habitat loss, hunting, and trapping for the illegal wildlife trade. This species was formerly placed in the genus Ptilinopus.

It is illegal to hunt, capture, or keep yellow-breasted fruit-doves under Philippine Law RA 9147.

== Taxonomy ==
The yellow-breasted fruit dove was formally described in 1844 by the English zoologist George Gray under the binomial name Ptilopus occipitalis. The type locality is the island of Luzon in the Philippines. The specific epithet occipitalis is from Latin, meaning "of the back of the head". The yellow-breasted fruit dove was formerly placed in the genus Ptilinopus. A molecular genetic study published in 2014 found that the fruit dove genus Ptilinopus was paraphyletic. In a move towards creating monophyletic genera, nine species including the yellow-breasted fruit dove were moved from Ptilinopus to Ramphiculus. Alternative names for the yellow-breasted fruit dove include sulphur-breasted fruit dove.

Two subspecies are recognised. They are recognised only on the basis on minor differences in size and plumage, and may be better treated as monotypic.

- R. o. occipitalis (Gray, GR, 1844) – lowland forest of northern and central Philippines
- R. o. incognitus (Tweeddale, A, 1877) – mountains of Mindanao (southeastern Philippines)

== Description ==
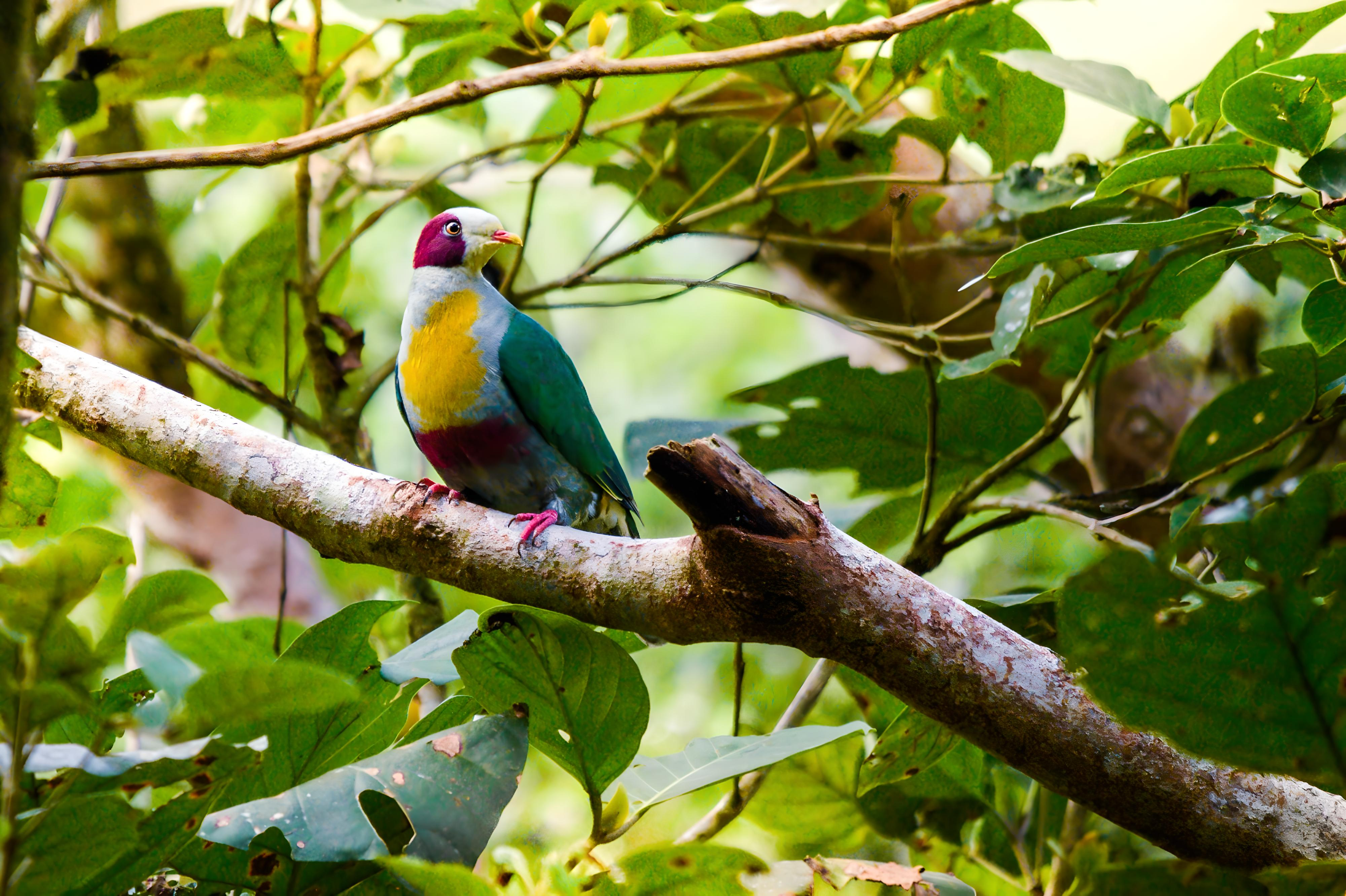
A wild ssp. occipitalis

It is locally known as siete colores, which means 7 colors and has been nicknamed by birdwatchers as sapin-sapin, which is a multicolored Filipino desert.

The yellow-breasted fruit dove is one of nine species in the genus Ramphiculus. Based on genetic analysis, this species' closest relatives are the Black-chinned fruit dove and Jambu fruit dove.

== Ecology and behavior ==
It is a frugivore.The Philippine green pigeon usually occurs singly or in small groups with other doves to feed on fruiting trees. Its flight is fast and direct, with the regular beats and an occasional sharp flick of the wings that are characteristic of pigeons in general.

== Habitat and conservation status ==
Its natural habitat is moist tropical primary lowland forest up to 1,800 meters above sea level.

The IUCN has classified the species as being of least concern but the population is believed to be declining due to deforestation from land conversion, Illegal logging and slash-and-burn farming. This species also experiences hunting pressure for both meat and the pet trade.
