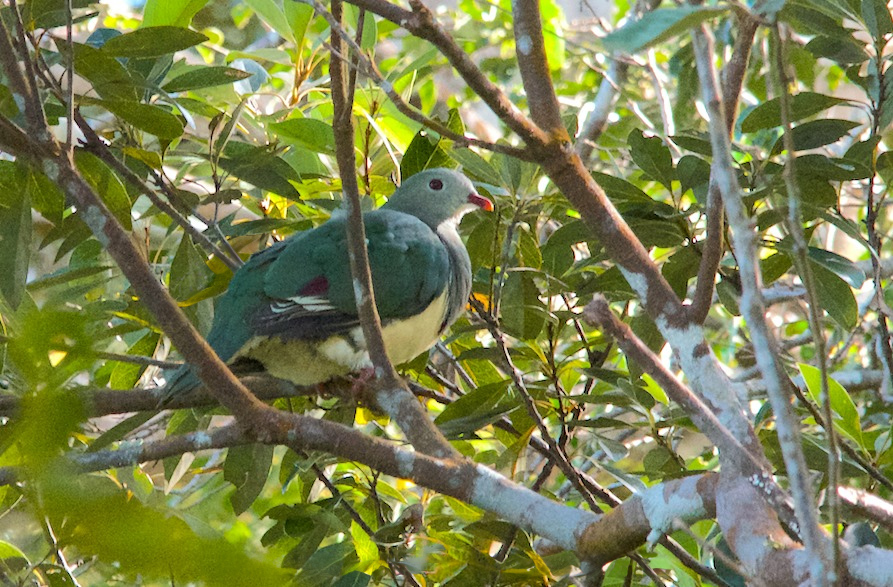
- Cream-breasted Fruit Dove merilli seen in the wild in South Sierra Madre.
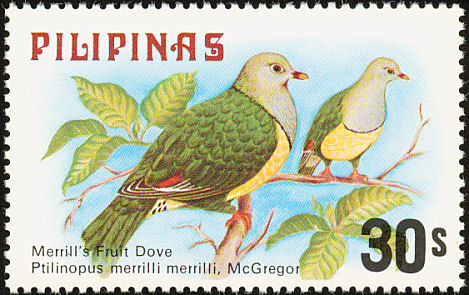
- A stamp of the merilli sub-species

Conservation status
- Near Threatened (IUCN 3.1)

Scientific classification
- Kingdom: Animalia
- Phylum: Chordata
- Class: Aves
- Order: Columbiformes
- Family: Columbidae
- Genus: Ramphiculus
- Species: R. merrilli

Binomial name
- Ramphiculus merrilli (McGregor, 1916)

Synonyms
- Ptilinopus merrilli

= Cream-bellied fruit dove =

Species of bird

The cream-bellied fruit dove (Ramphiculus merrilli) or cream-breasted fruit dove, is a species of bird in the family Columbidae. It is a large and primarily greenish dove with a distinctive red wing patch and cream coloured breast which it was named after. It is endemic to the Philippines found only on the islands of Luzon, Catanduanes and Polillo Islands. Its natural habitat is tropical moist lowland to montane forests of up to 1,300 masl. It is threatened by habitat loss and trapping for the pet trade. This species was formerly placed in the genus Ptilinopus.

It is illegal to hunt, capture or keep cream-bellied fruit-doves under Philippine Law RA 9147.

== Description and taxonomy ==
The cream-bellied fruit dove was formally described in 1916 by the Australian/American ornithologist Richard Crittenden McGregor as Leucotreron merrilli based on a specimen collected near Paete, Laguna Province, Luzon in the Philippines. The specific epithet was chosen to honour the American botanist Elmer Drew Merrill.

A fairly large dove of lowland and low-elevation montane forest on the island of Luzon. Has green upperparts, a gray head and chest and the eponymous cream-belly and breast. It also has a purple spot across the flight feathers. Its call is described as a ringing or quivering series of coos" This species does not exhibit sexual dimorphism.

The cream-bellied fruit dove was formerly one of over 50 species placed in the genus Ptilinopus. A molecular genetic study published in 2014 found that the fruit dove genus Ptilinopus was paraphyletic. In a move towards creating monophyletic genera, nine species including the cream-bellied fruit dove were moved from Ptilinopus to Ramphiculus. Within the genus, it is most closely allied with the flame-breasted fruit dove.

It was formerly placed in the obsolete genus Leucotreron. The species' generic name comes from the Greek ptilon (feather) and pous (foot). Alternative names for the cream-bellied fruit dove include Merrill's fruit dove.

=== Subspecies ===
Two subspecies are recognised:

- P. m. merrilli – (MacGregor, RC, 1916): The nominate subspecies, found in southern Luzon from the southern part of the Sierra Madres down to Bicol and Catanduanes region
- P. m. faustinoi – (Manuel, CG, 1936): Found in the mountains of northern Luzon starting from Quirino. Has a red crown patch and a whiter chin.

== Ecology and behavior ==
It is a frugivore. Usually occurs singly or in small groups even with other doves. Its flight is fast and direct, with the regular beats and an occasional sharp flick of the wings that are characteristic of pigeons in general.

Breeding mainly occurs in May to June, which is generally the breeding time for Philippine forest birds. Nests have been found with a single egg, but there is not enough data to assume average clutch size

== Habitat and conservation status ==
Its natural habitat is moist tropical primary forest up to 1,300 meters above sea level.

The IUCN has classified this species as near-threatened with the population on the declinedue to deforestation from land conversion, Illegal logging and slash-and-burn farming. This species also experiences hunting pressure for both meat and the pet trade. Birds of the World believes that this species should be uplisted to vulnerable as it has always been considered uncommon even in 1946 and has a fairly limited range despite being found across Luzon. More studies and surveys are recommended to better understand its biology, population and conservation status.

It is found in multiple protected areas such as Northern Sierra Madre Natural Park, Bulusan Volcano Natural Park, Mount Banahaw, Aurora Memorial National Park and Kalbario–Patapat Natural Park but despite this legal protection, deforestation and hunting continue even within these areas.
