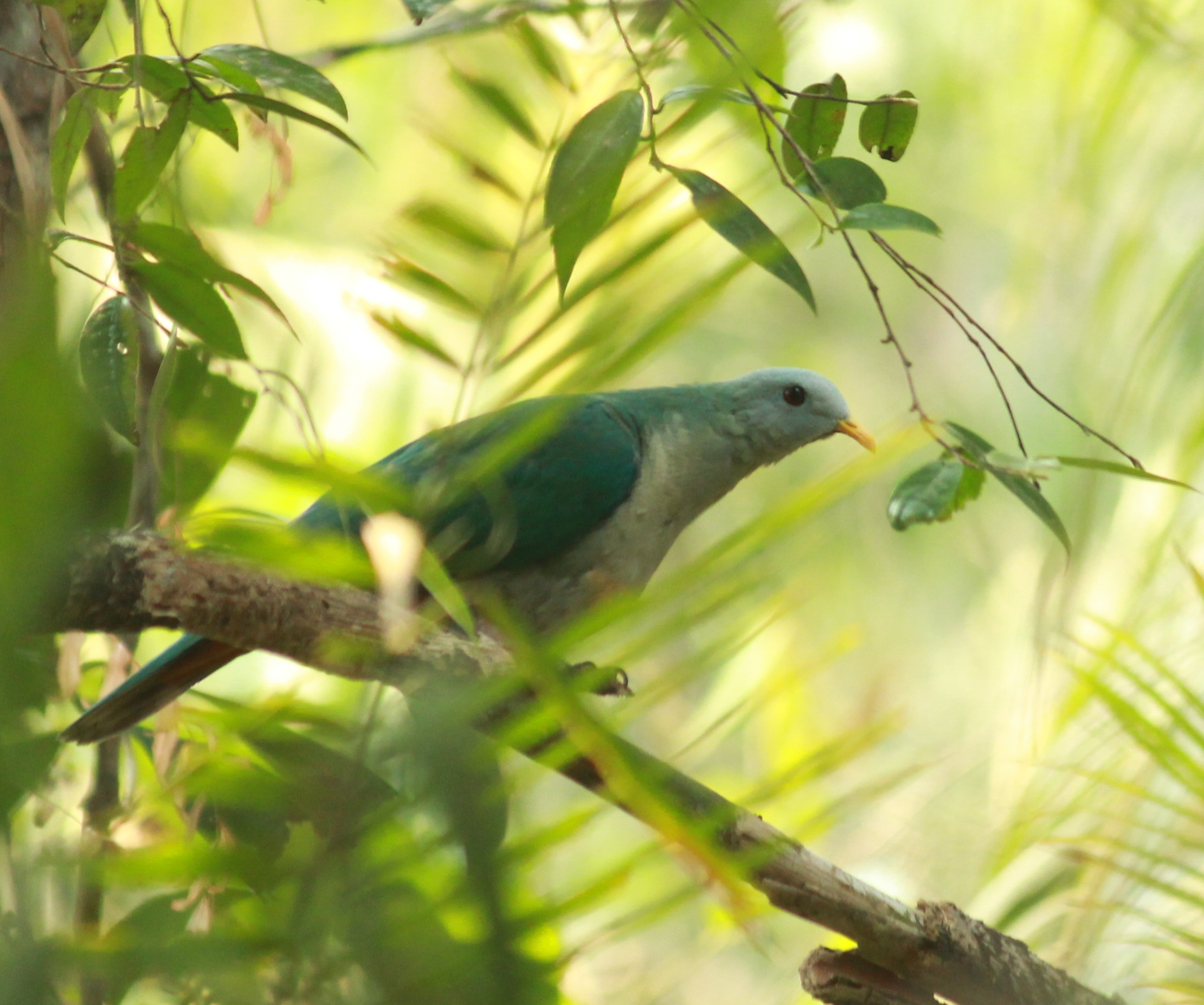

Conservation status
- Near Threatened (IUCN 3.1)

Scientific classification
- Kingdom: Animalia
- Phylum: Chordata
- Class: Aves
- Order: Columbiformes
- Family: Columbidae
- Genus: Ramphiculus
- Species: R. subgularis

Binomial name
- Ramphiculus subgularis (Meyer & Wiglesworth, 1896)

Synonyms
- Ptilinopus subgularis

= Banggai fruit dove =

Species of bird

The Banggai fruit dove (Ptilinopus subgularis), also known as the maroon-chinned fruit dove, is a species of bird in the family Columbidae. It is endemic to the Banggai Islands. Its natural habitat is subtropical or tropical moist lowland forests. This species was formerly placed in the genus Ptilinopus. It is threatened by habitat loss.

== Taxonomy ==
Prior to 2014, Ramphiculus subgularis or Ptilinopus subgularis was known as the maroon-chinned fruit dove, and also encompassed what is now Oberholser's fruit dove (Ptilinopus epia) and the Sula fruit dove (Ptilinopus mangoliensis), following Sibley and Monroe (1990, 1993).

The Banggai fruit dove was formerly placed in the genus Ptilinopus. A molecular genetic study published in 2014 found that the fruit dove genus Ptilinopus was paraphyletic. In a move towards creating monophyletic genera, nine species including the Banggai fruit dove were moved from Ptilinopus to Ramphiculus.

== Description ==
The Banggai fruit dove is a large gray and green dove that lives in the Banggai Islands. It is also a species in the bird family Columbidae. The bird's upperparts are forest green like and the bottom fades to a pale gray. It also features a deep red vent on the side, a small maroon chin, and a maroon base accented by the yellow beak. The fruit dove's chest is also buff and flares out slightly. The legs and feet of the bird can range from red to purple-red. There are few differences between the male and female birds, but the females tend to have more green on their necks.

Some of the Banggai fruit doves have slight variations. They can have various combinations of their color balance. The pale underside is more magnified in some and not as much in others. However, the maroon colored chin and maroon based yellow beaks are distinguishing factors. These attributes are more limited in range of qualities. In terms of location, the bird is found in select locations in the Indonesian islands, specifically the Banggai Islands.

== Distribution and habitat ==
They are found in Indonesia and are natural to the Banggai Islands. The birds mainly thrive in the forest regions. Specifically, the subtropical or tropical moist lowlands. However, this environment is degrading and leaving the Banggai Fruit Dove without a home. The cause of this environmental degradation is mainly subject to global climate change. The factors of climate change that are having the greatest impact are earthquakes, droughts, volcanic eruptions, and mudslides.

== Vocalization ==
The song of the Banggai fruit dove is described as a long series of "whoop" notes. There are typically around 20 notes in the series and the call will last for 2.7 seconds. It may be shorter or longer, but when broken down that comes to 0.07 seconds per note.

== Conservation status ==
The Banggai fruit dove is threatened by habitat loss and is considered to be Near Threatened by the IUCN. As of 2024, the population has not been estimated, but is believed to be decreasing.
