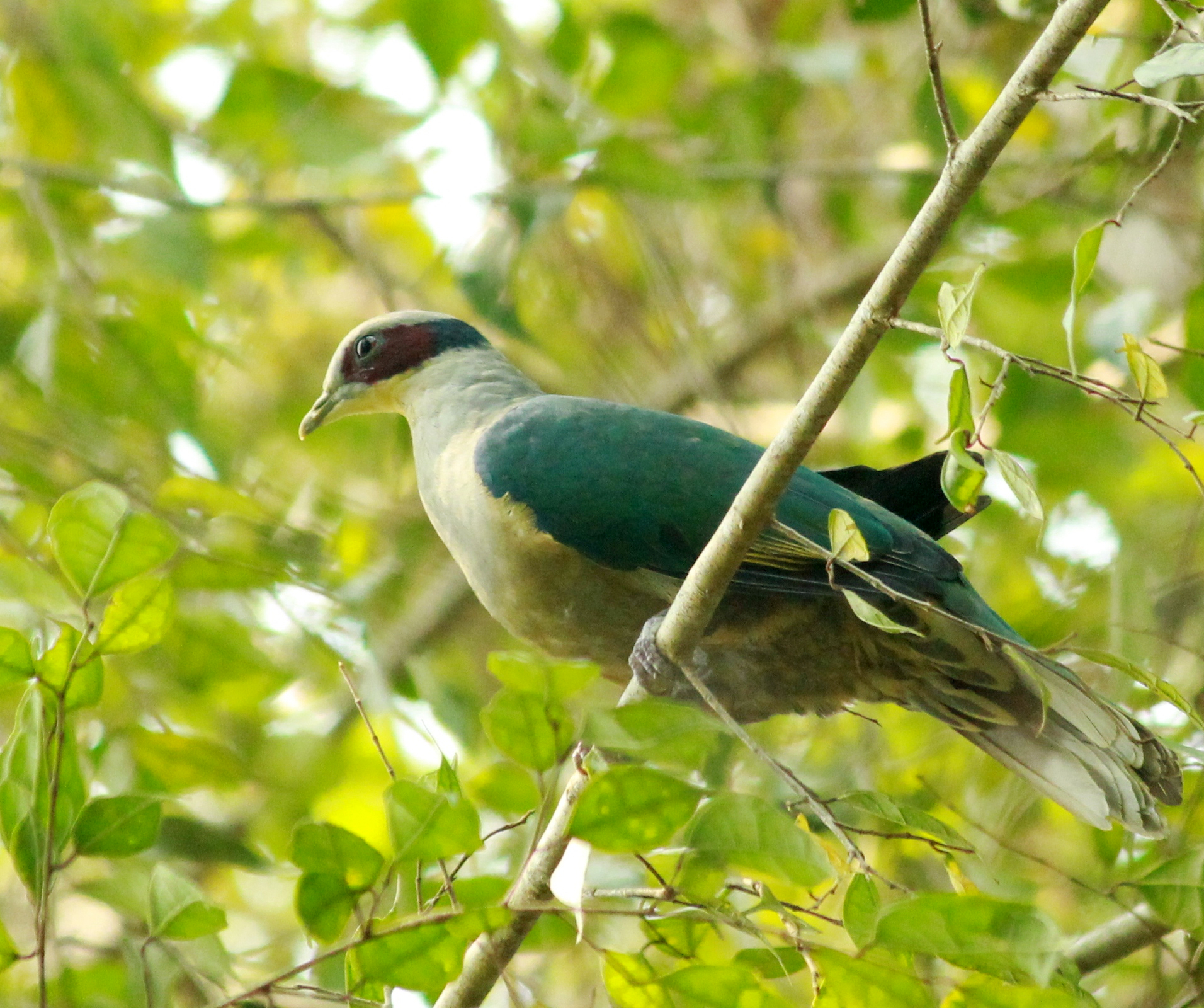

Conservation status
- Least Concern (IUCN 3.1)

Scientific classification
- Kingdom: Animalia
- Phylum: Chordata
- Class: Aves
- Order: Columbiformes
- Family: Columbidae
- Genus: Ramphiculus
- Species: R. fischeri

Binomial name
- Ramphiculus fischeri (Brüggemann, 1876)

Synonyms
- Ptilinopus fischeri Leucotreron fischeri Ramphiculus meridionalis

= Red-eared fruit dove =

Species of bird

Red-eared Fruit-Dove at Lore Lindu NP, Sulawesi

The red-eared fruit dove (Ramphiculus fischeri) is a species of bird in the pigeon family. It is endemic to the island of Sulawesi, Indonesia. This species was formerly placed in the genus Ptilinopus.

== Distribution ==
Its natural habitat is subtropical or tropical moist montane forests. They are found at elevations between 1,000–3,000 m (3,300–9,800 ft).

== Subspecies ==
Three subspecies are recognised; they differ in the colour of the upperparts:

- R. f. fischeri (Brüggemann, F, 1876) – montane forest of northern Sulawesi. Wing coverts, back, rump and tail green.
- R. f. centralis (Meyer, AB, 1903) – montane forest of central and southeastern Sulawesi. Wing coverts, rump and tail green, back brown.
- R. f. meridionalis (Meyer, AB & Wiglesworth, LW, 1893) – southwestern Sulawesi (Lompobattang Massif). Rump and tail green, wing coverts and back brown. This subspecies has previously been treated as a separate species, the Lompobattang fruit dove (Ramphiculus meridionalis) by the HBW/BirdLife International taxonomy.

== Status ==
It is listed as least concern by the IUCN although their populations are currently decreasing.

== See also ==
- Fauna of Indonesia
- List of least concern birds
