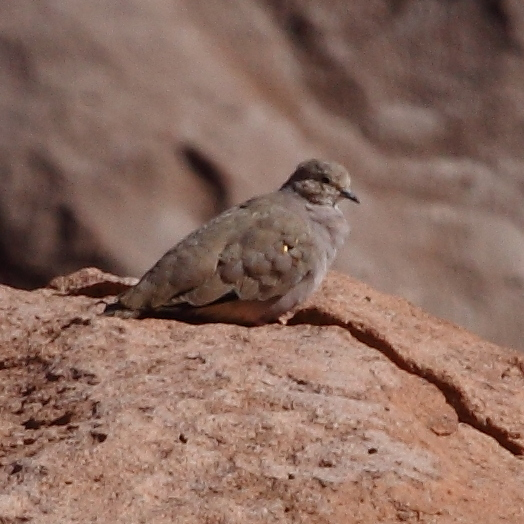
- Golden-spotted ground dove at, San Pedro de Atacama, Antofagasta Region, Chile

Conservation status
- Least Concern (IUCN 3.1)

Scientific classification
- Kingdom: Animalia
- Phylum: Chordata
- Class: Aves
- Order: Columbiformes
- Family: Columbidae
- Genus: Metriopelia
- Species: M. aymara

Binomial name
- Metriopelia aymara (Prévost, 1840)

= Golden-spotted ground dove =

Species of bird

The golden-spotted ground dove (Metriopelia aymara) is a species of bird in the family Columbidae. It is found in Argentina, Bolivia, Chile, and Peru.

== Taxonomy and systematics ==
The golden-spotted ground dove was placed in the monotypic genus Leptophaps by some authors. It has no subspecies.

== Description ==
The adult golden-spotted ground dove's upperparts are pale fawn brown with a reddish pink tinge. Its throat is white, its belly buff, and the underparts between them reddish pink. The inner tail feathers are grayish brown with black tips and the outer ones purplish black. The closed wing shows a row of the eponymous iridescent golden spots, two purplish black patches, and a purplish black swath at the tips of the flight feathers. The eye is brown, and uniquely in its genus, is not surrounded by bare skin. Juveniles are paler than the adults, have little or no pink, and do not have the golden spots on the wing.

== Distribution and habitat ==
The golden-spotted ground dove is found from Ancash in central Peru east to west-central Bolivia and south to Chile's Coquimbo Region and Argentina's Mendoza Province. It inhabits the arid and semi-arid parts of the puna zone of the Andes. There it is found on the plains, along lake shores, and amid grass tussocks. It flocks in Polylepis woodland or rocky terrain during the nesting season. In elevation it mostly ranges between 2,800 and 5,000 m (9,200 and 16,400 ft) but can be found as low as 300 m (980 ft) in the southern part of its range.

== Behavior ==
=== Feeding ===
The golden-spotted ground dove feeds on the ground, usually in small flocks but sometimes large ones. Its diet has not been studied.

=== Breeding ===
The golden-spotted ground dove usually places its nest in grass but may also site it in trees or among rocks. Nests with eggs have been found between April and August and juveniles from July to as late as December. The clutch size is two.

=== Vocalization ===
No details of the golden-spotted ground dove's vocalizations have been published. Its wings rattle during takeoff.

== Status ==
The IUCN has assessed the golden-spotted ground dove as being of Least Concern. It "appears to be locally common in some areas" but its biology and ecology are almost unknown.
