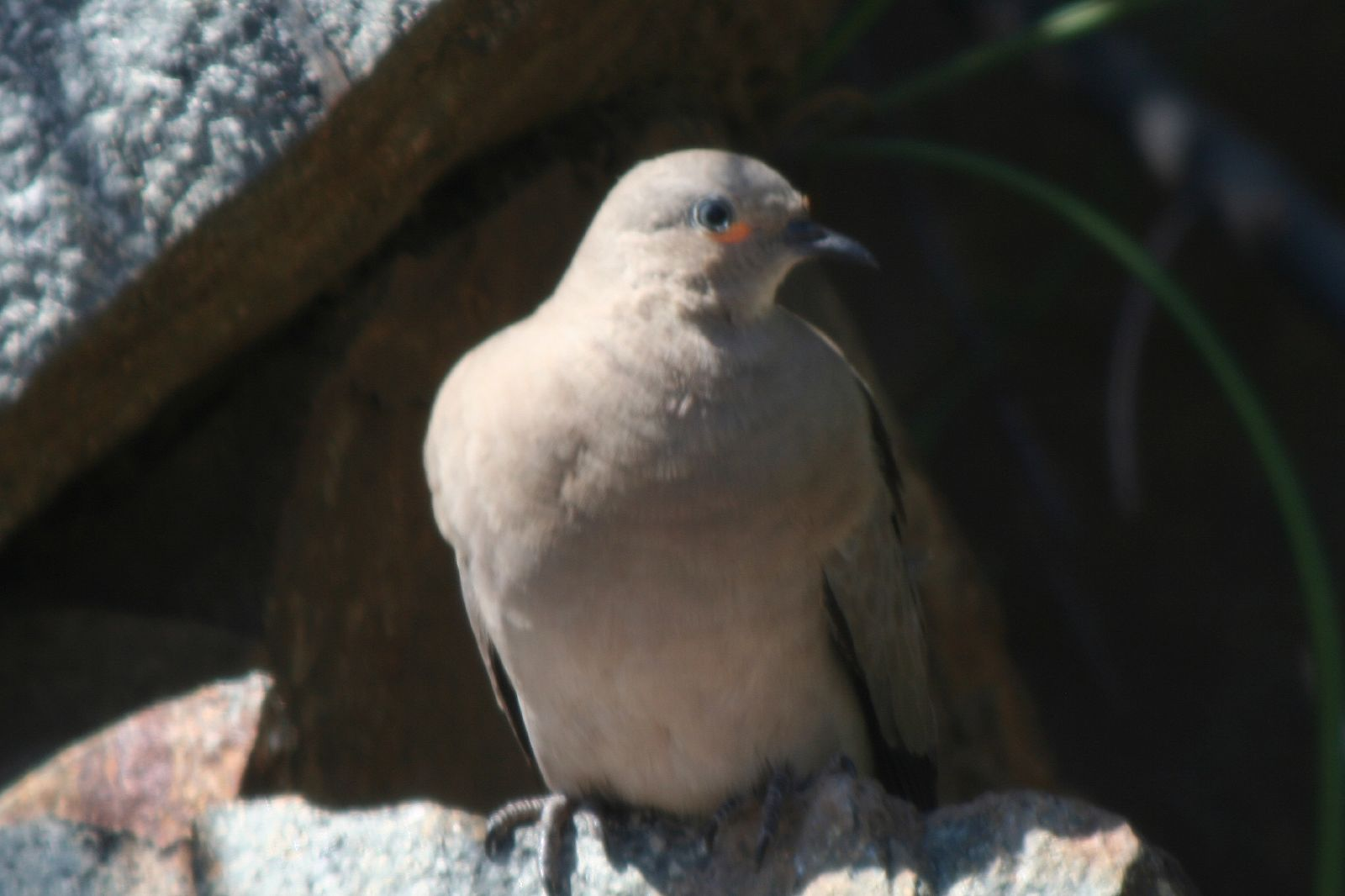

Conservation status
- Least Concern (IUCN 3.1)

Scientific classification
- Kingdom: Animalia
- Phylum: Chordata
- Class: Aves
- Order: Columbiformes
- Family: Columbidae
- Genus: Metriopelia
- Species: M. melanoptera

Binomial name
- Metriopelia melanoptera (Molina, 1782)

= Black-winged ground dove =

Species of bird

The black-winged ground dove (Metriopelia melanoptera) is a species of bird in the family Columbidae. It lives in Argentina, Bolivia, Chile, Colombia, Ecuador, and Peru and is usually found in grassy areas near tree lines but roosts in Polylepis forest and Puya colonies. Throughout most of its range, it occurs at altitudes between 2,000 and 4,400 m (6,600 and 14,400 ft) but between 900 and 4,900 m (3,000 and 16,100 ft) in Chile. It moves to lower elevations in winter.

== Taxonomy and systematics ==
The black-winged ground dove has two subspecies, the nominate M. m. melanoptera and M. m. saturatior.

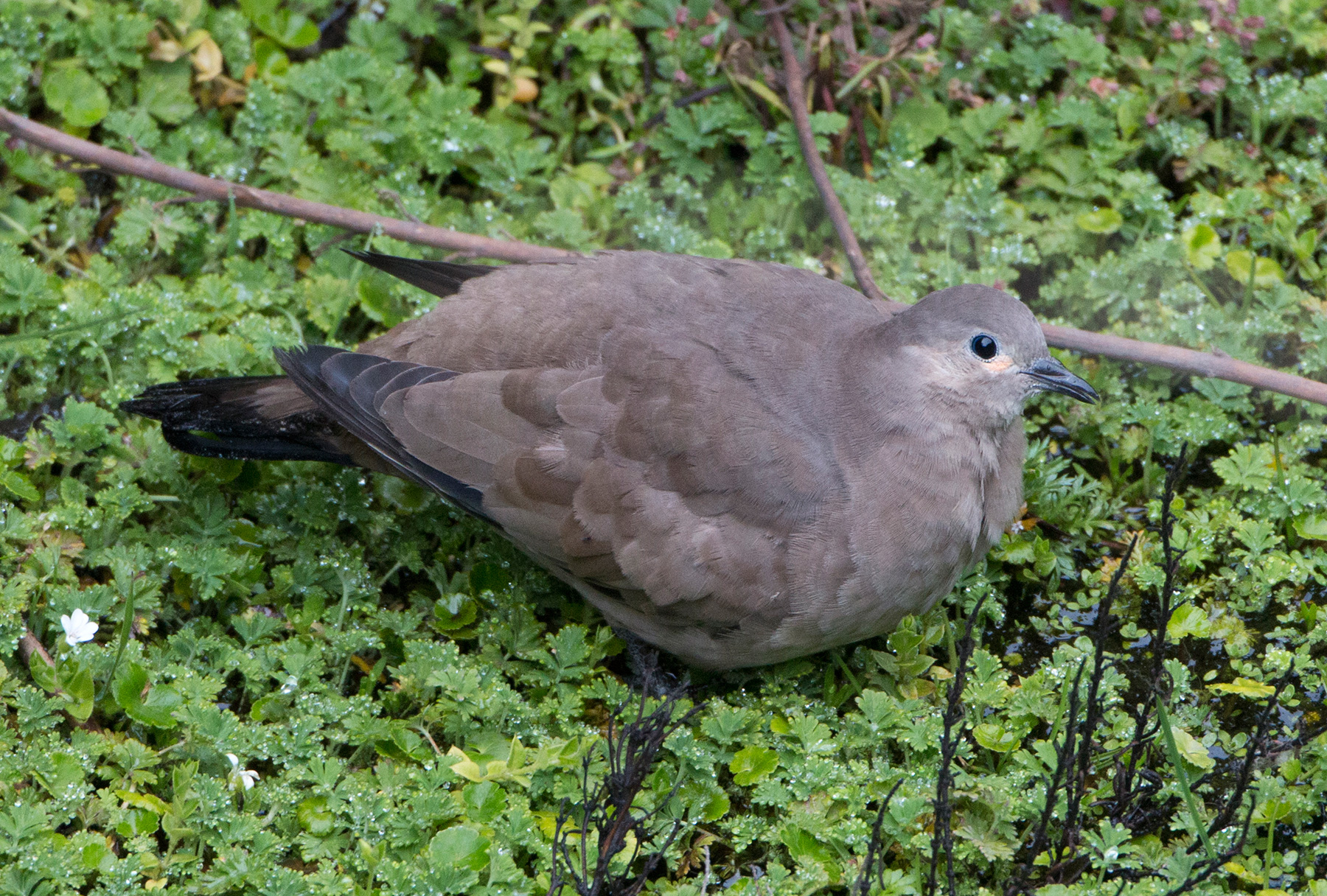
Black-winged ground dove, lower slopes of Chimborazo, Ecuador

== Description ==
The black-winged ground dove is 21 to 23 cm (8.3 to 9.1 in) long. Males weigh 89.1 to 114 g (3.14 to 4.02 oz) and females 86 to 96.1 g (3.03 to 3.39 oz). The nominate adult male is grayish brown or earth brown above with a faint pink tinge. The throat is whitish and the underparts fawn pink with gray flanks. The closed wing shows a white edge and some pale gray. The eye color is highly variable as is the bare skin that surrounds it. The adult female's upperparts are a duller brown than the male's and the underparts less pink. Juveniles do not have the adults' pink tinge, and many feathers have buff edges. M. m. saturatior differs from the nominate by being darker and grayer above and less pink below.

=== Distribution and habitat ===
The nominate subspecies of black-winged ground dove is a year-round resident from central Peru and adjacent Bolivia south through most of Chile and western Argentina. It breeds but does not winter on Tierra del Fuego. M. m. saturatior is found in the Andes of southwestern Colombia south to Ecuador's Azuay Province.

The black-winged ground dove inhabits páramo in Colombia and Ecuador and puna in Peru, Bolivia, Chile, and Argentina. It is typically found in grassy areas near treeline but roosts in Polylepis woodland and Puya stands. In much of its range it occurs between 2,000 and 4,400 m (6,600 and 14,400 ft) but from 900 to 4,900 m (3,000 to 16,100 ft) in Chile. It moves to the lower elevations in winter.

== Behavior ==
=== Feeding ===
The black-winged ground dove feeds on the ground in small flocks. Its primary food appears to be grass seeds but details are lacking.

=== Breeding ===
The black-winged ground dove's breeding season varies with latitude. In Colombia and Ecuador, eggs have been found between August and October. In the south the season continues past October to February. Its nest is a fragile platform of sticks, usually in bushes, bromeliads, or cacti but sometimes on the ground. The clutch size is two.

=== Vocalization ===
The black-winged ground dove's song is a "series of relatively high-pitched, double notes 'rrree-up...rrree-up...rrreee-up...'." It also gives a short "piu" call.

== Status ==
The IUCN has assessed the black-winged ground dove as being of Least Concern. It "[a]ppears to be generally common and locally numerous" and its bleak habitat is not heavily affected by humans except by cutting of Polylepis for firewood.
