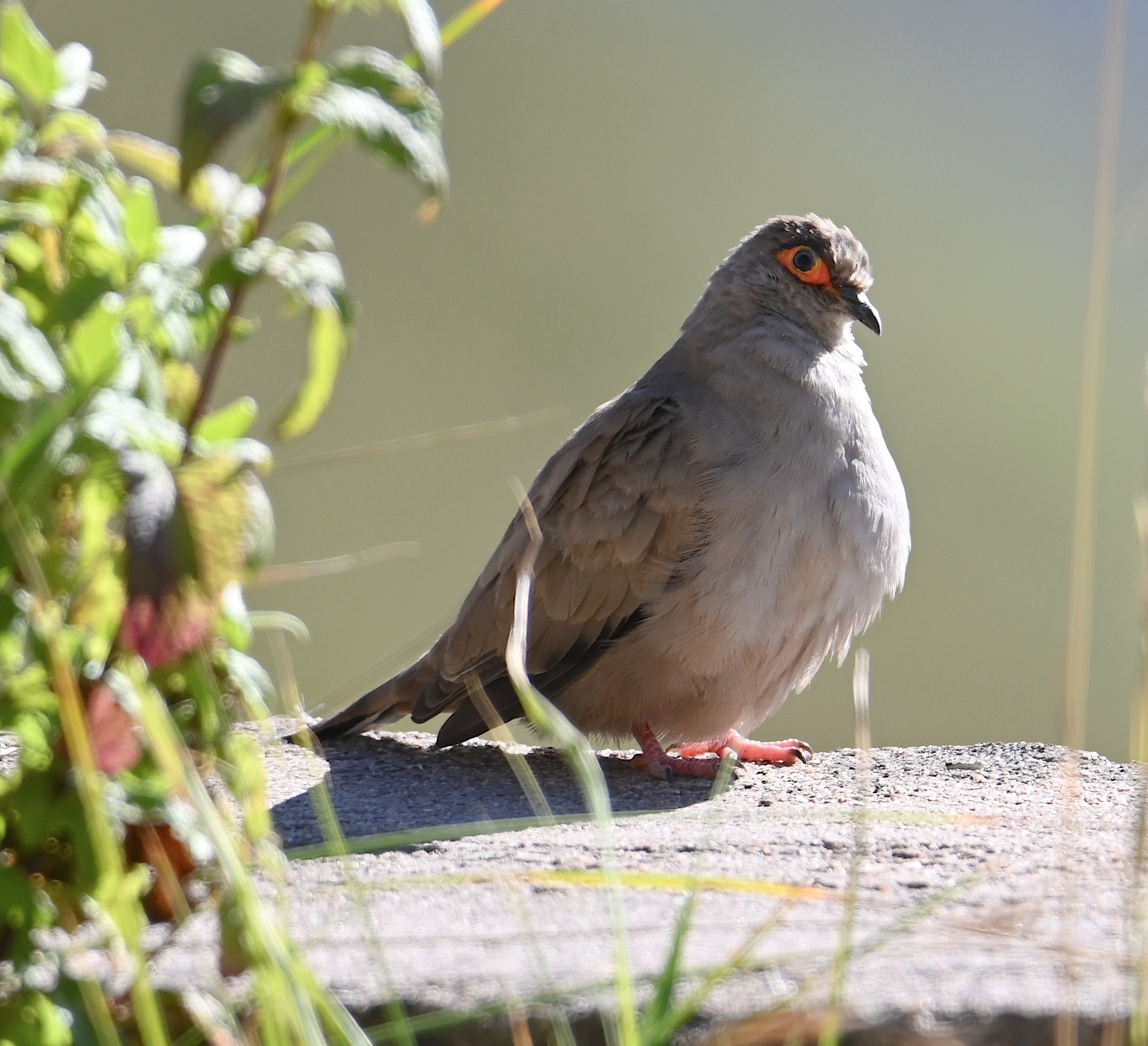

Conservation status
- Least Concern (IUCN 3.1)

Scientific classification
- Kingdom: Animalia
- Phylum: Chordata
- Class: Aves
- Order: Columbiformes
- Family: Columbidae
- Genus: Metriopelia
- Species: M. morenoi

Binomial name
- Metriopelia morenoi (Sharpe, 1902)

Synonyms
- Gymnopelia morenoi

= Moreno's ground dove =

Species of bird

Moreno's ground dove (Metriopelia morenoi) or the bare-eyed ground dove, is a species of bird in the family Columbidae. It is endemic to Argentina.

== Taxonomy and systematics ==
The Moreno's ground dove and its sister species bare-faced ground dove (Metriopelia ceciliae) were previously placed in genus Gymnopelia. It is monotypic.

== Description ==
Moreno's ground dove is about 17 cm (6.7 in) long. The adult's upperparts are mostly dull brown with a grayish head and shoulders. Its throat is light gray darkening to brownish gray on the breast and belly, buffy at the vent, and reddish brown on the undertail coverts. The outer tail feathers are black with white tips. Its eye is blue surrounded by bright orange bare skin that in turn is surrounded by a thin black line. The sexes are essentially alike except that the female's eye surround is paler. The juvenile's plumage is similar to the adults' but many feathers have rufous fringes.

== Distribution and habitat ==
Moreno's ground dove is found only in northwestern Argentina. It inhabits temperate and puna grassland characterized by cactus, scrub, and at lower elevation scattered trees. In elevation it ranges from at least 1,800 to 3,200 m (5,900 to 10,500 ft).

== Behavior ==
=== Feeding ===
Moreno's ground dove is known to feed on the ground, usually in small groups, but its diet has not been documented.

=== Breeding ===
Moreno's ground dove lays its two eggs in cavities in earthen banks. No other information about its breeding phenology has been published.

=== Vocalization ===
Though the bare-faced ground dove's vocalizations are not well known, it "has been recorded producing cooing calls: a series of 3–5 soft and nasal 'cuEec cuEec cuEec', as well as a faster and deeper sounding series of 'coo coo coo coo coo'."

== Status ==
The IUCN has assessed Moreno's ground dove as being of Least Concern. However, it has a very small range and is "[v]ery poorly known and little studied."
