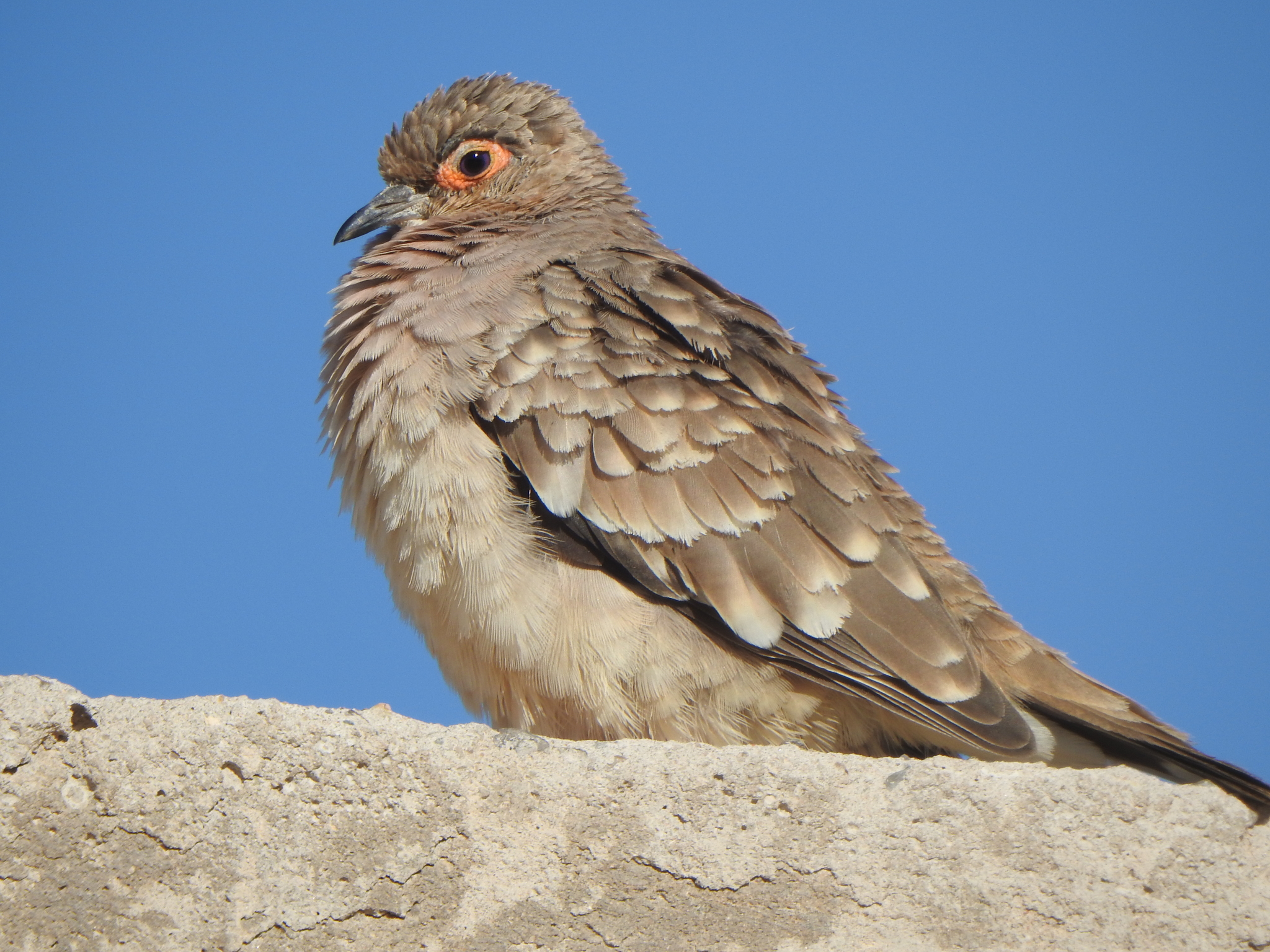

Conservation status
- Least Concern (IUCN 3.1)

Scientific classification
- Kingdom: Animalia
- Phylum: Chordata
- Class: Aves
- Order: Columbiformes
- Family: Columbidae
- Genus: Metriopelia
- Species: M. ceciliae

Binomial name
- Metriopelia ceciliae (Lesson, 1845)
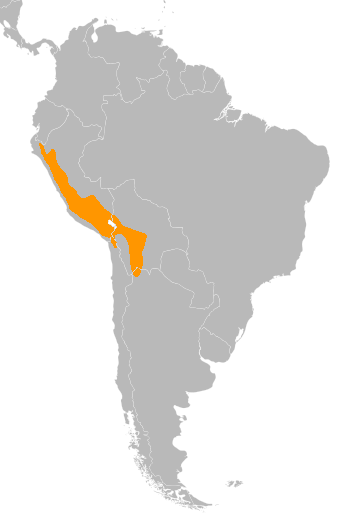
- Geographic range

Synonyms
- Gymnopelia ceciliae

= Bare-faced ground dove =

Species of bird

The bare-faced ground dove (Metriopelia ceciliae) is a species of bird in the family Columbidae. It is found in Argentina, Bolivia, Chile, and Peru.

== Taxonomy and systematics ==
The bare-faced ground dove and its sister species Moreno's ground dove (Metriopelia morenoi) were previously placed in genus Gymnopelia. Three subspecies are recognized, the nominate Metropelia ceciliae ceciliae, M. c. obsoleta, and M. c. zimmeri. However, the Cornell Lab of Ornithology's Birds of the World considers M. c. obsoleta to be "doubtfully valid".

== Description ==
The bare-faced ground dove is 16 to 17 cm (6.3 to 6.7 in) long and weighs about 66 g (2.3 oz). The nominate subspecies is brown or grayish brown above, with white or buffy tips on feathers giving a spotted appearance. Its neck and breast are gray with a reddish or pinkish tinge and its belly is buffy. The outer tail feathers are black with white tips. The eye is blue or bluish white surrounded by bare yellow to orange skin that is itself surrounded by narrow black feathers. Male and female plumages are essentially alike though the female's breast is less pink. Juveniles are similar to the adults. M. c. obsoleta is paler and grayer than the nominate, and M. c. zimmeri is darker, browner, and has a yellow to blue eye.

== Distribution and habitat ==
The nominate subspecies of bare-faced ground dove is found in western Peru, M. c. obsoleta in northern Peru, and M. c. zimmeri in southern Peru, western Bolivia, northern Chile, and northwestern Argentina. They inhabit arid and semi-arid landscapes of sandy soil with little vegetation. In higher elevation areas it frequents human habitations, apparently because the surrounding countryside is treeless, and it is also common in major urban areas such as Lima. In elevation it generally ranges between 2,000 and 4,500 m (6,600 and 14,800 ft) but is found much lower in western Peru.

== Behavior ==
=== Feeding ===
The bare-faced ground dove is known to feed on the ground, usually in small groups, but its diet has not been documented.

=== Breeding ===
The bare-faced ground dove nests on the ground, on cliffs, or in holes in buildings. Essentially nothing else is known about its breeding phenology.

=== Vocalization ===
Though the bare-faced ground dove's vocalizations are not well known, it "has been recorded producing a series of five similar ascending and later abruptly descending double-sounding cooing notes" and a "Wo ow" sound "like a growling wow".

== Status ==
The IUCN has assessed the bare-faced ground dove as being of Least Concern. It is "[considered] common throughout most of its range" and "[h]as not obviously suffered adverse effects from man".
