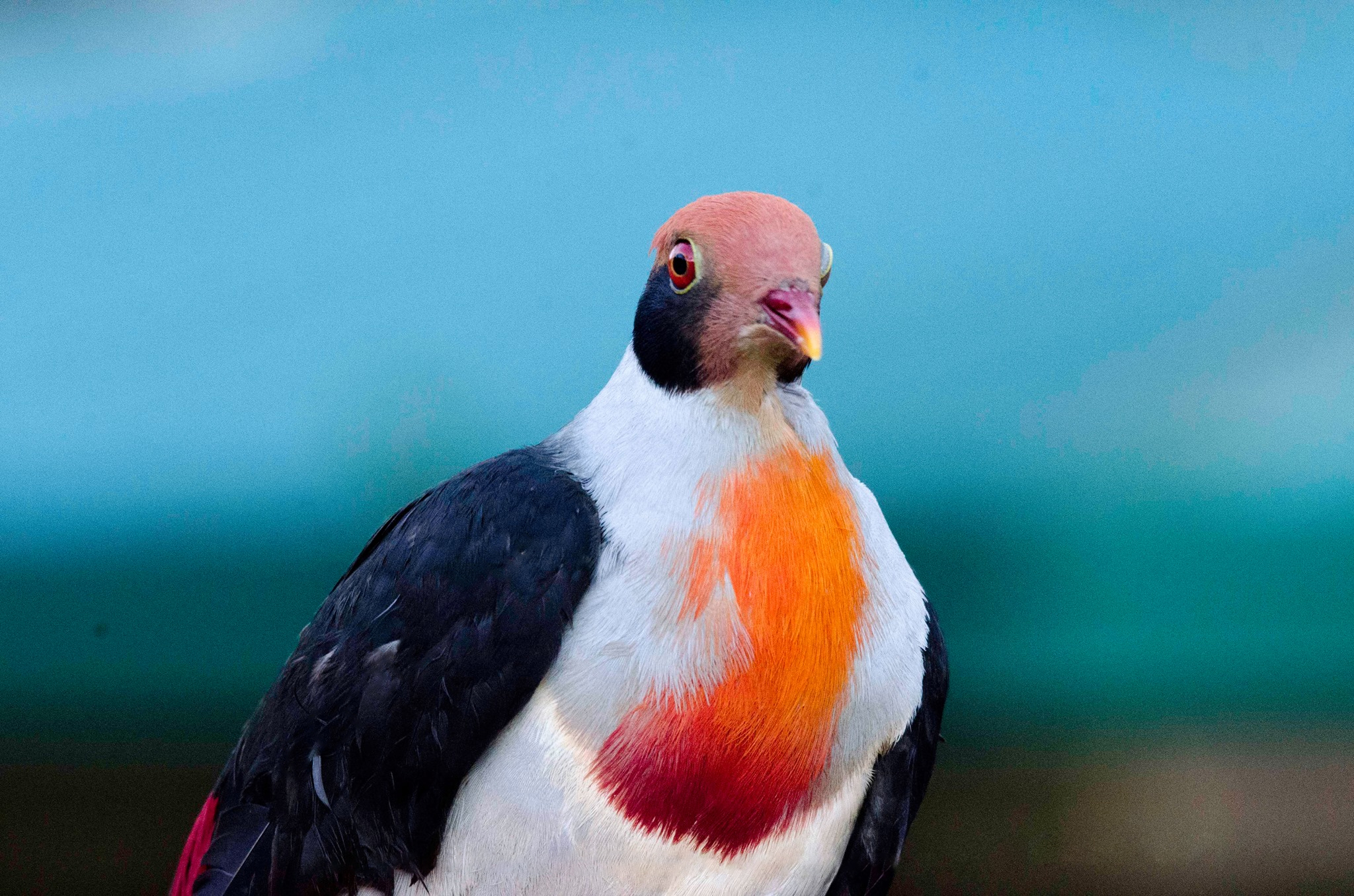

Conservation status
- Near Threatened (IUCN 3.1)

Scientific classification
- Kingdom: Animalia
- Phylum: Chordata
- Class: Aves
- Order: Columbiformes
- Family: Columbidae
- Genus: Ramphiculus
- Species: R. marchei

Binomial name
- Ramphiculus marchei (Oustalet, 1880)

Synonyms
- Ptilinopus marchei

= Flame-breasted fruit dove =

Species of bird

The flame-breasted fruit dove (Ramphiculus marchei) is a species of bird in the family Columbidae. It is endemic to the Philippines where it is only found in the mountains of Luzon. It is the largest fruit dove in the country and rivals the size of Imperial pigeons. It is identified with its red hood, black wings with a red patch on its secondaries and its unmistakable flame-coloured breast. Its natural habitats are in upper areas of the tropical moist lowland forest and in mid to upper montane forest. It is threatened by habitat loss, poaching for the pet trade and hunting for food. This species was formerly placed in the genus Ptilinopus.

It is illegal to hunt, capture or keep flame-breasted fruit-doves under Philippine Law RA 9147.

== Description and taxonomy ==
It is described on EBird as "A fairly large dove. Pale gray from the belly to the sides of the chest and neck, with a sooty back and cheek, an orange chest patch with dark red below, and a pink crown and mark across the flight feathers. Similar to the Yellow-breasted Fruit-Dove, but Flame-breasted has an orange rather than yellow chest and a dark pink crown. Song is a deep, rising-then-falling 'oo-woo'. Takes flight with loud wing claps." This species exhibit some sexual dimorphism in which females have more pronounced green on tail, rump and wings. It reaches sizes of up to 38 centimetres (15 in) long and weighs around 330 grams (12 oz).

This was named in honor of Antoine-Alfred Marche who was a French naturalist and explorer. This species is monotypic. Due to its red chest, it is often mistaken to be a Bleeding-heart dove, however this fruit dove is significantly larger and does not have the same ground dwelling habits of the bleeding-heart.

== Ecology and behavior ==
It is a frugivore. Usually occurs singly or in small groups even with other doves. Its flight is fast and direct, with the regular beats and an occasional sharp flick of the wings that are characteristic of pigeons in general.

Breeding mainly occurs in May to June, which is generally the breeding time for Philippine forest birds. Nests have been found with a single egg, but there is not enough data to assume average clutch size

== Habitat ==
It has been recorded in lowland and hill dipterocarp, mid-montane and mossy forest ranging from 450 to 2,300 meters above sea level. However, it is chiefly found above 1,000 meters above sea level in mid-montane forest It is found only in good quality primary forest as it not tolerant and unable to thrive in secondary forest.

== Conservation status ==
As of 2025, the International Union for Conservation of Nature lists this species as Near-threatened with a revised population estimate of 8,000 to 15,000 mature individuals. This was downlisted from vulnerable in previous years. This is not because the population has increased but rather the general belief that this bird is overlooked and not as endangered as originally thought . The rate of habitat loss in montane forest now much lower and has supposedly slowed down.

It is threatened by habitat loss, poaching for the pet trade, nest disturbance and hunting for food. They have been seen being sold in illegal online markets on Facebook for approximately 6,000 persos (~100 USD) which is 10x the minimum daily wage in Manila. Habitat loss is its main threat with wholesale clearance of forest habitats as a result of logging, agricultural conversion and mining activities occurring within the range. Forest cover in the Sierra Madre has declined by 83% since the 1930s and most remaining areas are under logging concessions and may suffer further from major road-building plans. The National List of Threatened Terrestrial Fauna of the Philippines has classified it as Endangered.

It is found in some protected areas like Mount Pulag, Mounts Banahaw–San Cristobal Protected Landscape and Northern Sierra Madre Natural Park. The entire Apayao province is listed as one of the UNESCO Biosphere Reserves of Southeast Asia. Despite this, habitat destruction and poaching continues even within these protected areas.

A large majority of sight records accounting for more than 80% of all Ebird records are either in Mount Polis and along the Sierra Madre mountain range near Infanta. While this is a case of observer and location bias, these 2 areas still represent an important habitat and subpopulation for this bird. Unfortunately, both areas have undergone significant habitat destruction due to road construction, land conversion into resorts and farmland and poaching.

The International Union for Conservation of Nature recommends more surveys be done to know the full extent of this bird and to make key habitats on Mt. Cetaceo (Cagayan Valley), Infanta, Quezon and Mount Polis as formally protected areas and to promote stricter enforcement of laws designed to stop hunting and trade.

Under the Philippine law RA9147, it is completely illegal to hunt these birds or to capture and keep them as pets. As it is endangered species on the Philippine Red List, any violations have harsher punishments including "imprisonment of four (4) years and one (1) day to six (6) years and/or a fine of Fifty thousand pesos (P50,000.00) to Five hundred thousand pesos (P500,000.00), if inflicted or undertaken against endangered species"
