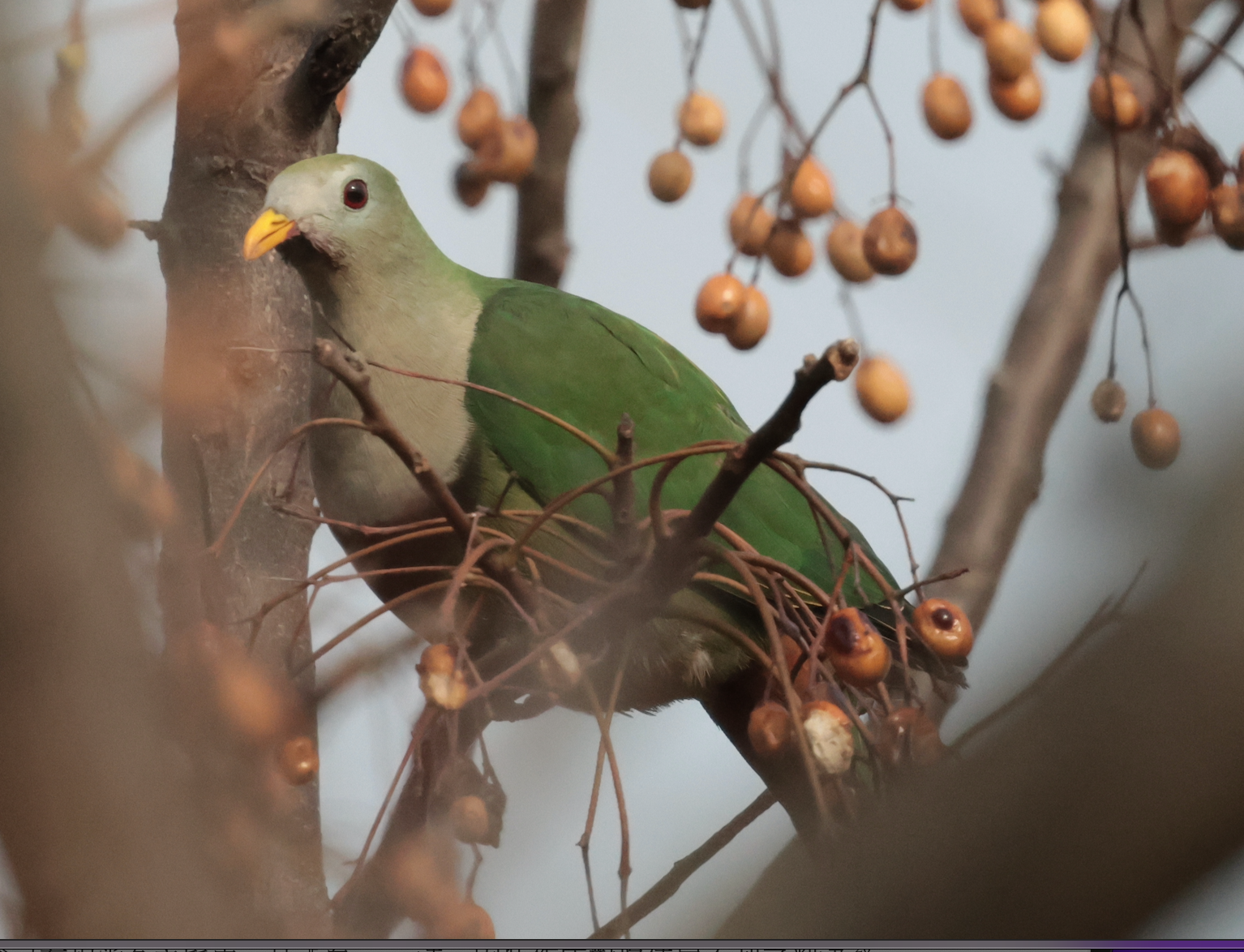
- Male
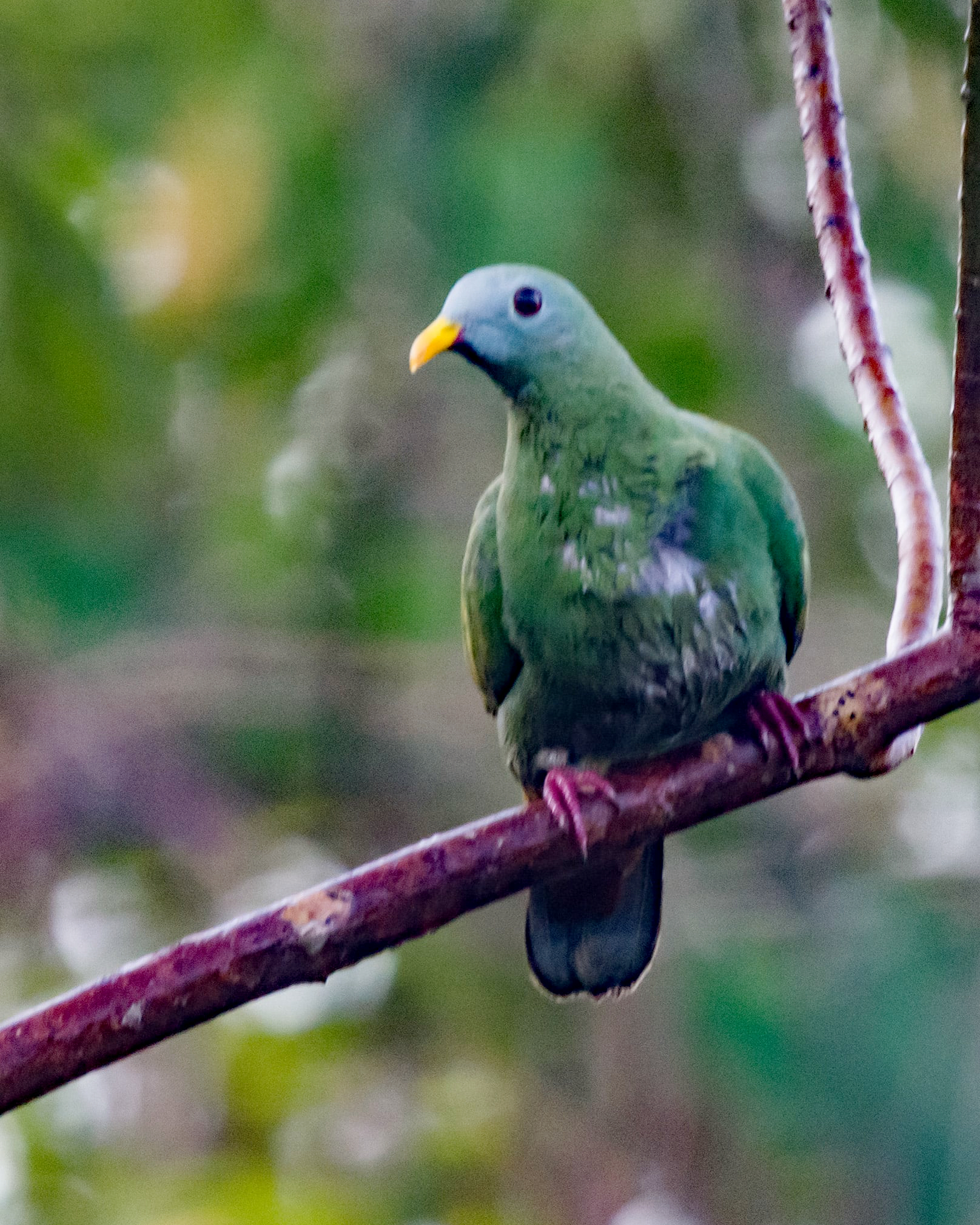
- Female

Conservation status
- Least Concern (IUCN 3.1)

Scientific classification
- Kingdom: Animalia
- Phylum: Chordata
- Class: Aves
- Order: Columbiformes
- Family: Columbidae
- Genus: Ramphiculus
- Species: R. leclancheri

Binomial name
- Ramphiculus leclancheri (Bonaparte, 1855)

Synonyms
- Ptilinopus leclancheri

= Black-chinned fruit dove =

Species of bird

The black-chinned fruit dove (Ramphiculus leclancheri), also known as the black-throated fruit dove or Leclancher's dove, is a species of bird in the family Columbidae. It is found in the lowland forests of the Philippines and Taiwan. This species was formerly placed in the genus Ptilinopus.

== Taxonomy ==
The black-chinned fruit dove was formerly placed in the genus Ptilinopus. A molecular genetic study published in 2014 found that the fruit dove genus Ptilinopus was paraphyletic. In a move towards creating monophyletic genera, nine species including the black-chinned fruit dove were moved from Ptilinopus to Ramphiculus.

Four subspecies are recognized:

- R. l. taiwanus (Ripley, SD, 1962) – Taiwan; Batan, Calayan and Camiguin Norte islands (northern Philippines)
- R. l. longialis (Manuel, CG, 1936) – Lan yü Island (just south of Taiwan); Batan, Calayan, and Camiguin Norte islands
- R. l. leclancheri (Bonaparte, CLJL, 1855) – Philippines (except Palawan, Basilan, and Sulu Archipelago)
- R. l. gironieri (Verreaux, JP & des Murs, MAPO, 1862) – Palawan (southwestern Philippines)

== Description ==
It is a medium-sized (up to 27 cm (11 in) long) bird of the family Columbidae. The male is a colorful bird with a green belly and wings, a brown tail, a whitish grey head and neck with a purple base, red iris and a small black patch under its yellow bill. The female has a green head, neck and breast.

== Behaviour and ecology ==
The diet consists mainly of fruits. The female usually lays a single white egg in a nest made of twigs.

== Distribution and habitat ==
Its natural habitats at tropical moist lowland primary forest and secondary forest up to 1,000 meters above sea level. It is found in lowland forests up to 700 meters above sea level in Taiwan and the Philippines, where it is fairly common. On Taiwan, it is very rare, known only from four specimens.

== Conservation status ==
IUCN has assessed this bird as least-concern species with the population believed to be declining due to deforestation in the Philippines continues throughout the country due to slash and burn farming, mining, illegal logging and habitat conversion. It is also caught for the illegal wildlife trade and hunted for meat.
