= Friedrich Brüggemann =

German zoologist and entomologist

Friedrich Brüggemann (1850, Bremen – 1878, London ) was a German zoologist and entomologist

Friedrich Brüggemann was an Assistant in the zoological Institute in Jena

Later he was engaged in work on the corals in the collection of the British Museum. He died of lung haemorrhage at the age of 28.

== Works ==
Coleoptera

- 1873 "Systematisches Verzeichniss der bisher in der Gegend von Bremen gefundenen Käferarten". Abhandl. Naturw. Ver. Bremen, 3: 441–524.

Corals

- 1877. "Notes on Stony Corals in the Collection of the British Museum". Annals and Magazine of Natural History. Ser. 4, Vol. xix. pp. 415–422.
- 1879 "Corals. An account of the petrological, botanical, and zoological collections made in Kerguelen's Land and Rodriguez during the Transit of Venus expeditions, carried out by order of Her Majesty's government in the years 1874–75". Phil Trans R Soc Lond 168: 569–579.

Birds

- 1876 Beiträge zur Ornithologie von Celebes und Sangir Abhandlungen des Naturwissenschaftlichen Vereins zu Bremen
- 1877 Über eine Vogelsammlung von Südost-Borneo Abhandlungen des Naturwissenschaftlichen Vereins zu Bremen
- 1877 Nachträgliche Notizen zur Ornithologie von Celebes Abhandlungen des Naturwissenschaftlichen Vereins zu Bremen
- 1878 Weitere Mitteilungen über die Ornithologie von Zentral-Borneo Abhandlungen des Naturwissenschaftlichen Vereins zu Bremen
