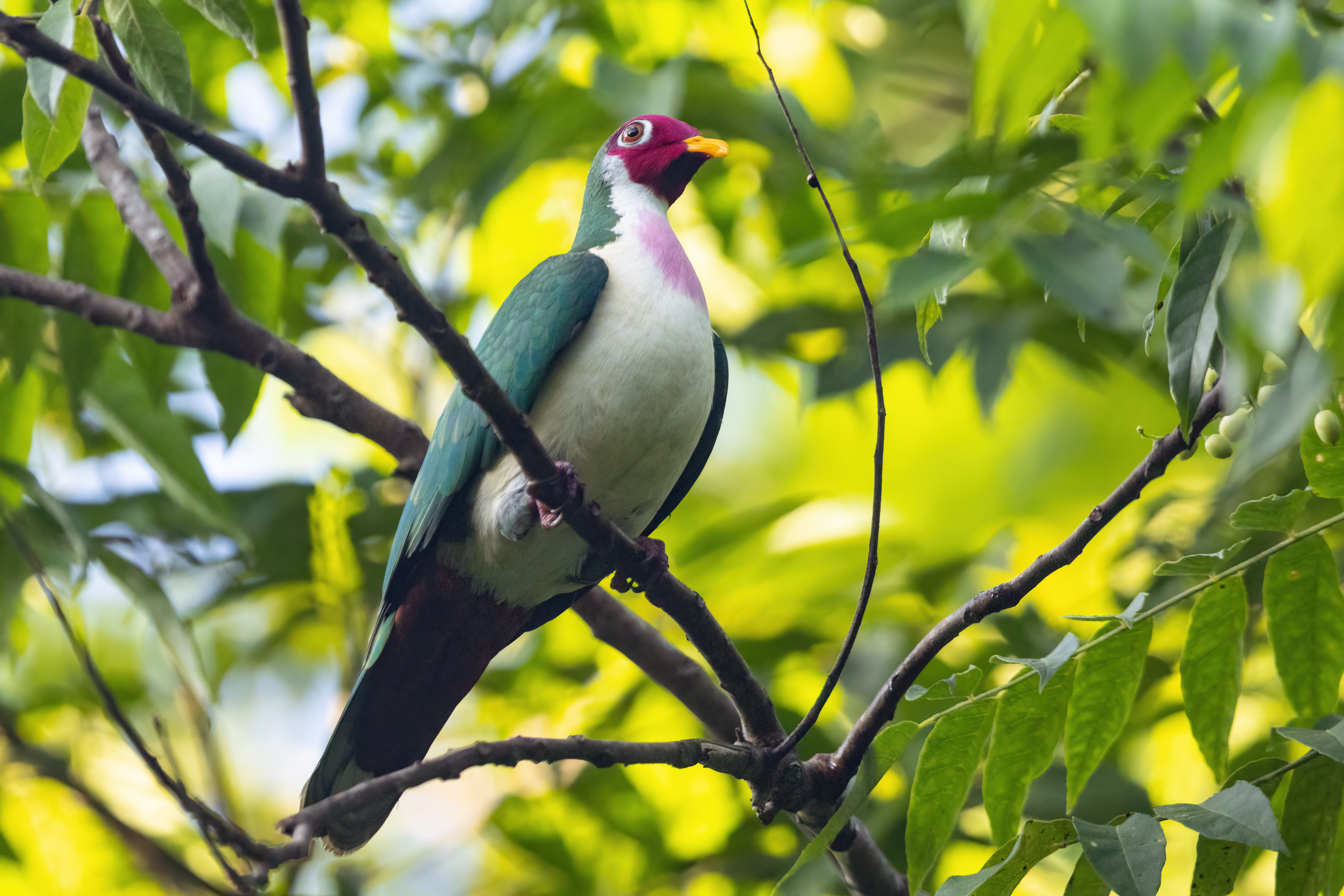

Conservation status
- Vulnerable (IUCN 3.1)

Scientific classification
- Kingdom: Animalia
- Phylum: Chordata
- Class: Aves
- Order: Columbiformes
- Family: Columbidae
- Genus: Ramphiculus
- Species: R. jambu

Binomial name
- Ramphiculus jambu (Gmelin, JF, 1789)

Synonyms
- Ptilinopus jambu

= Jambu fruit dove =

Species of bird

The jambu fruit dove (Ramphiculus jambu) is a smallish colourful fruit dove. It is a resident breeding species in southern Thailand, Malaysia, Brunei and the Indonesian islands of Kalimantan, Sumatra and Java. This species was formerly placed in the genus Ptilinopus.

== Taxonomy ==
The jambu fruit dove was formally described in 1789 by the German naturalist Johann Friedrich Gmelin in his revised and expanded edition of Carl Linnaeus's Systema Naturae. He placed it with all the other doves and pigeons in the genus Columba and coined the binomial name Columba jambu. Gmelin gave the locality as Java, he based his description on the "pooni-jamboo" that had been first described in 1783 by the Irish orientalist William Marsden in his book The History of Sumatra. Punai jambu is the Malay name for the species which William wrote comes from the colour of its head which is similar to the flower of the Malay rose apple (Eugenia malaccense) tree or known to him later as jambu merah; this word jambu was used as the bird's specific epithet. The species is monotypic: no subspecies are recognised.

The jambu fruit dove was formerly placed in the genus Ptilinopus. A molecular genetic study published in 2014 found that the fruit dove genus Ptilinopus was paraphyletic. In a move towards creating monophyletic genera, nine species including the jambu fruit dove were moved from Ptilinopus to Ramphiculus.

== Description ==
Male feeding on the ground

The jambu fruit dove is 23–27 cm (9.1–10.6 in) long and weighs about 42 g (1.5 oz). It is a plump small-headed bird with soft feathers and very distinctive colouring including a white eye ring, orange bill and red legs in both male and female birds.

The adult male has a crimson face with a black chin, unmarked dark green upperparts and ivory white underparts, with a pink patch on the breast and a chocolate brown undertail. The female differs from the male by having a dull purple face with a dark chin. The underparts are dull green with a white belly and cinnamon or buff undertail.

The immature jambu fruit dove resembles the female but has a green face. The young male acquires its full adult plumage in about 39 weeks from fledging. Immature males are similar in appearance to females. The call is a soft, low coo.

== Distribution and habitat ==
The jambu fruit dove is found on the Malay Peninsula through Sumatra (including Riau Archipelago) and the islands of Nias, Bangka and Belitung) to Borneo and perhaps in west Java. It inhabits mangrove swamps and lowland rain forests up to 1,500 m (4,900 ft) and is also found in secondary woodland.

== Behaviour and ecology ==
The jambu fruit dove is a shy and inconspicuous bird, camouflaged against the forest canopy by its green plumage. It is usually seen alone or in pairs, but a sizable flock may gather when feeding at a fruit tree. It eats fruit directly from the tree, or from the ground if items have been dropped by hornbills or monkeys. Like other doves, but unlike most birds, it can drink by sucking.

=== Breeding ===
The male holds a breeding territory, advertised by raising its wings, bobbing its body and cooing. It will defend its territory with a quick peck if the territorial display fails. The female builds a flimsy nest of twigs, roots and grasses, which are collected by her mate, in a tree and lays one or sometimes two white eggs which are incubated for about 20 days to hatching, with a further 12 or more days to fledging.

== Relationship with humans ==
The Temoq people in Pahang, Malaysia believe that the female jambu fruit dove is a form of their creator ancestor Maq Sidi.

== Conservation status ==
Extensive deforestation in Indonesia and Malaysia means that this dove is now threatened, and sustenance hunting is expected to be further depleting its population. The jambu fruit dove is evaluated as Vulnerable on the IUCN Red List of Threatened Species.
