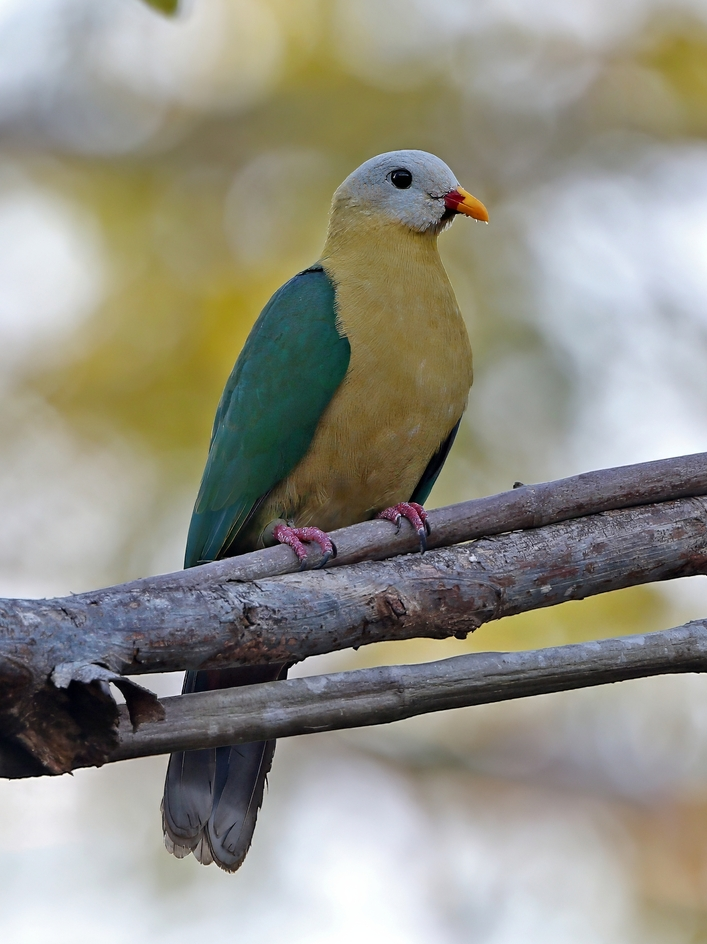

Conservation status
- Near Threatened (IUCN 3.1)

Scientific classification
- Kingdom: Animalia
- Phylum: Chordata
- Class: Aves
- Order: Columbiformes
- Family: Columbidae
- Genus: Ramphiculus
- Species: R. mangoliensis

Binomial name
- Ramphiculus mangoliensis (Rothschild, 1898)

Synonyms
- Ptilinopus mangoliensis

= Sula fruit dove =

Species of bird

The Sula fruit dove (Ramphiculus mangoliensis) is a species of bird in the family Columbidae. It is endemic to the Sula Islands. Its natural habitat is subtropical or tropical moist lowland forests. It is threatened by habitat loss.

The Sula fruit dove was formerly placed in the genus Ptilinopus. A molecular genetic study published in 2014 found that the fruit dove genus Ptilinopus was paraphyletic. In a move towards creating monophyletic genera, nine species including the Sula fruit dove were moved from Ptilinopus to Ramphiculus.
