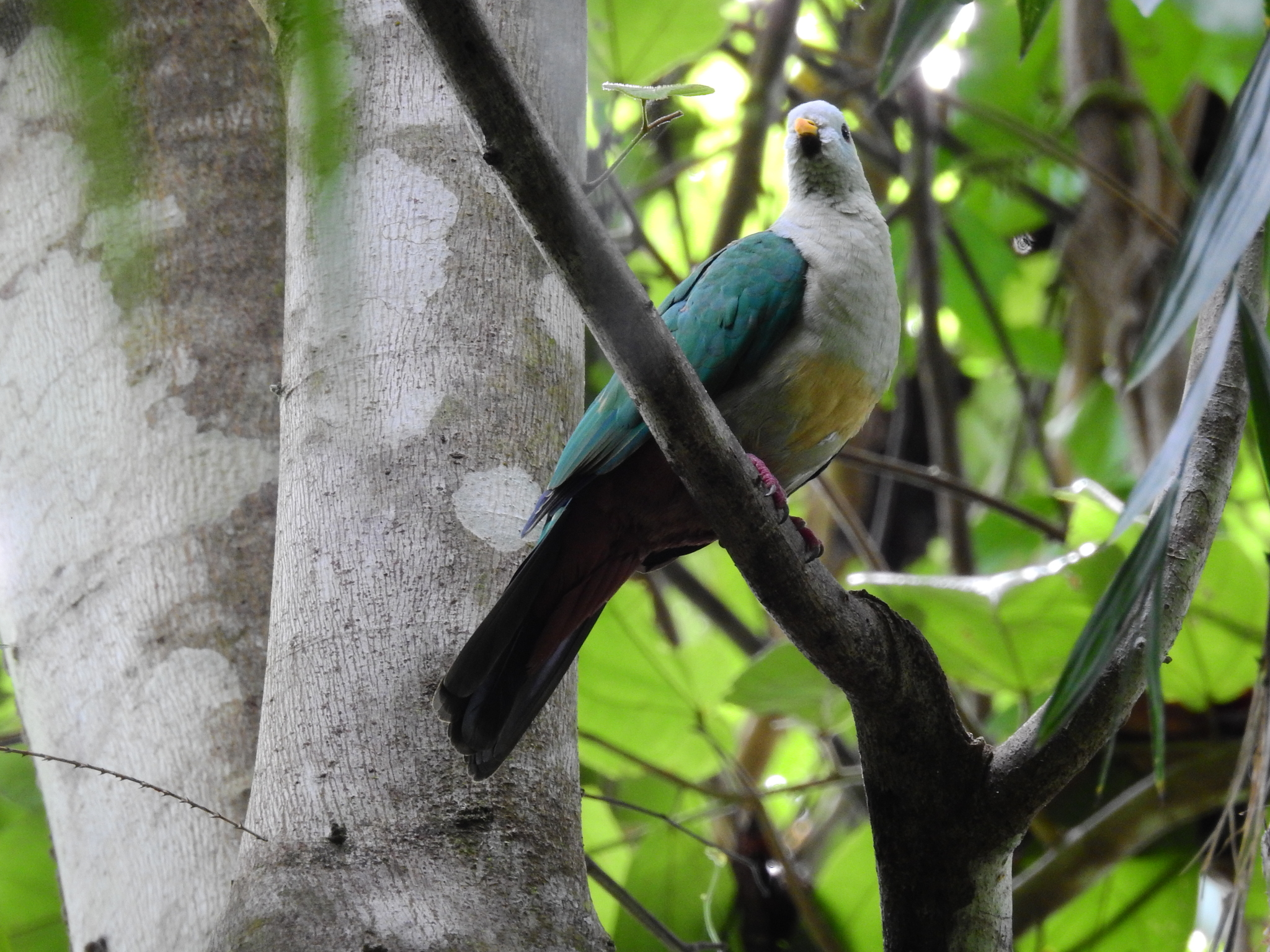

Conservation status
- Least Concern (IUCN 3.1)

Scientific classification
- Kingdom: Animalia
- Phylum: Chordata
- Class: Aves
- Order: Columbiformes
- Family: Columbidae
- Genus: Ramphiculus
- Species: R. gularis

Binomial name
- Ramphiculus gularis (Quoy & Gaimard, 1832)

Synonyms
- Ptilinopus epius Oberholser, 1918

= Oberholser's fruit dove =

Species of bird

Oberholser's fruit dove (Ramphiculus gularis) is a species of bird in the family Columbidae. It was formerly named P. epius, but it has since been revised to the earlier name P. gularis. It is endemic to Sulawesi. Its natural habitat is subtropical or tropical moist lowland forests. It is threatened by habitat loss.

Oberholser's fruit dove was formerly placed in the genus Ptilinopus. A molecular genetic study published in 2014 found that the fruit dove genus Ptilinopus was paraphyletic. In a move towards creating monophyletic genera, nine species including Oberholser's fruit dove were moved from Ptilinopus to Ramphiculus.
