= Southern beardless tyrannulet =

In 2026 the southern beardless tyrannulet (Camptostoma obsoletum) was split into six species:

- Southeastern beardless tyrannulet (Camptostoma obsoletum)
- Pacific beardless tyrannulet (Camptostoma sclateri)
- Venezuelan beardless tyrannulet (Camptostoma pusillum)
- Cauca beardless tyrannulet (Camptostoma caucae)
- Amazonian beardless tyrannulet (Camptostoma napaeum)
- Panama beardless tyrannulet (Camptostoma flaviventre)
