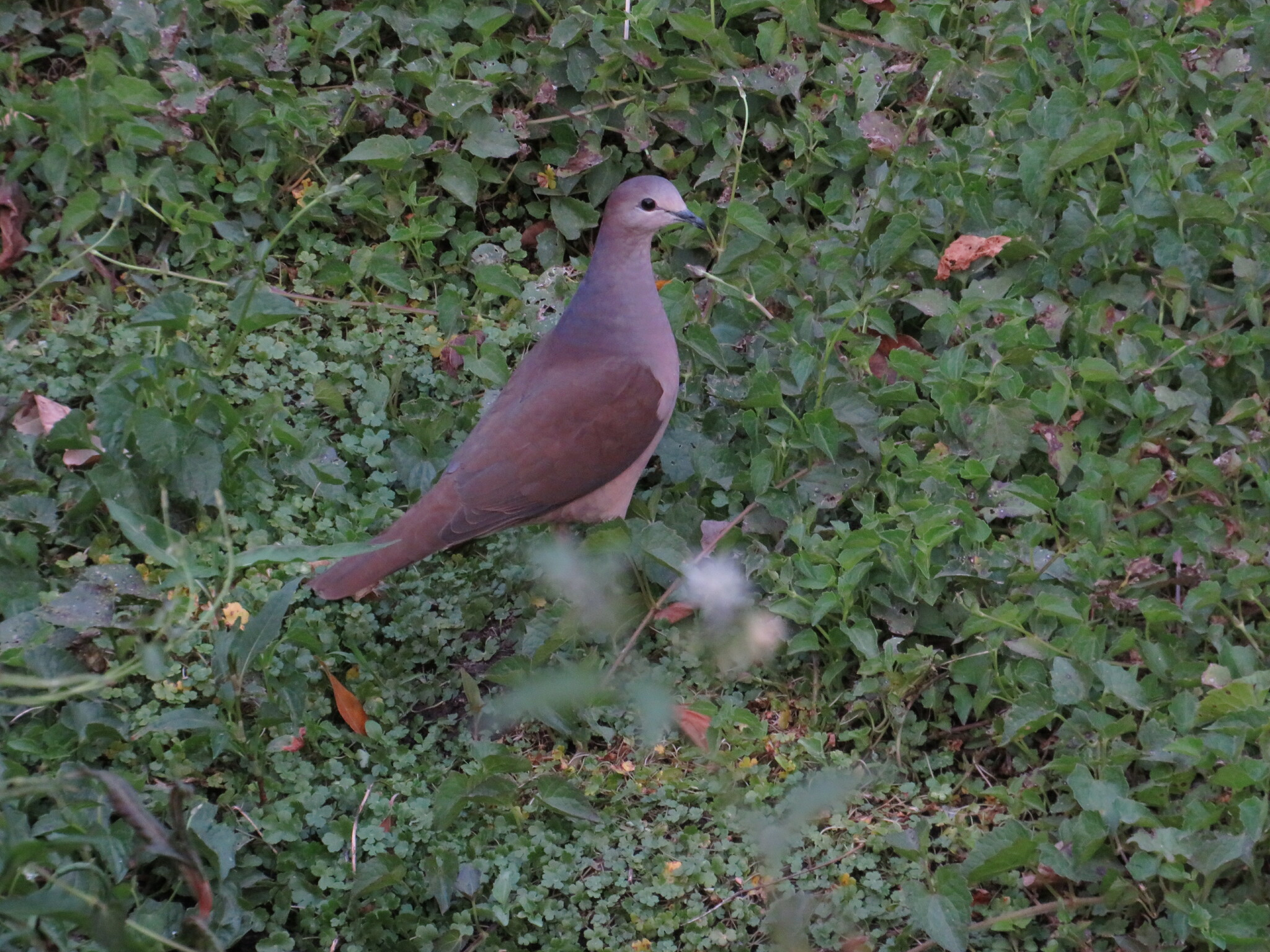

Conservation status
- Least Concern (IUCN 3.1)

Scientific classification
- Domain: Eukaryota
- Kingdom: Animalia
- Phylum: Chordata
- Class: Aves
- Order: Columbiformes
- Family: Columbidae
- Genus: Leptotila
- Species: L. megalura

Binomial name
- Leptotila megalura Sclater, PL & Salvin, 1879

= Yungas dove =

Species of bird

The Yungas dove (Leptotila megalura), also known as the white-faced dove or large-tailed dove, is a species of bird in the family Columbidae. It is found in Argentina and Bolivia.

== Taxonomy and systematics ==
The Yungas dove is monotypic. However, the southern population has sometimes been suggested as a distinct subspecies. The Yungas dove and the grey-fronted dove (L. rufaxilla) are sister species.

== Description ==
The Yungas dove is 29 to 32 cm (11 to 13 in) long. The adult's forehead is grayish and its crown bluish gray. The eye is very dark and is surrounded by white feathers; the rest of the face is buff or pinkish buff. Its upperparts and tail are a dark ruddy brown with a purple gloss on the hindneck and upper mantle. Its breast and the sides of the neck are grayish pink lightening to white on the belly. The adult sexes are similar; the juvenile is duller and its wing coverts appear scaly.

== Distribution and habitat ==
The Yungas dove is found in the Bolivian and Southern Andean Yungas on the east slope of the Andes of Bolivia and northwestern Argentina. It inhabits humid subtropical and tropical woodlands including secondary forest. It is also found in semi-arid Prosopis woodlands. In elevation it ranges between 900 and 2,800 m (3,000 and 9,200 ft).

== Behavior ==
=== Feeding ===
Details of the Yungas dove's foraging behavior and diet have not been published.

=== Breeding ===
Little is known about the Yungas dove's breeding phenology. It nests in bushes or trees, and the clutch size is two eggs.

=== Vocalization ===
The Yungas dove's song is "four (occasionally five) mournful monotonous notes on same pitch...'woooo-o-o-oooooo'."

== Status ==
The IUCN has assessed the Yungas dove as being of Least Concern. However, it is "generally uncommon in much of its range" and its biology and ecology are very poorly known.
