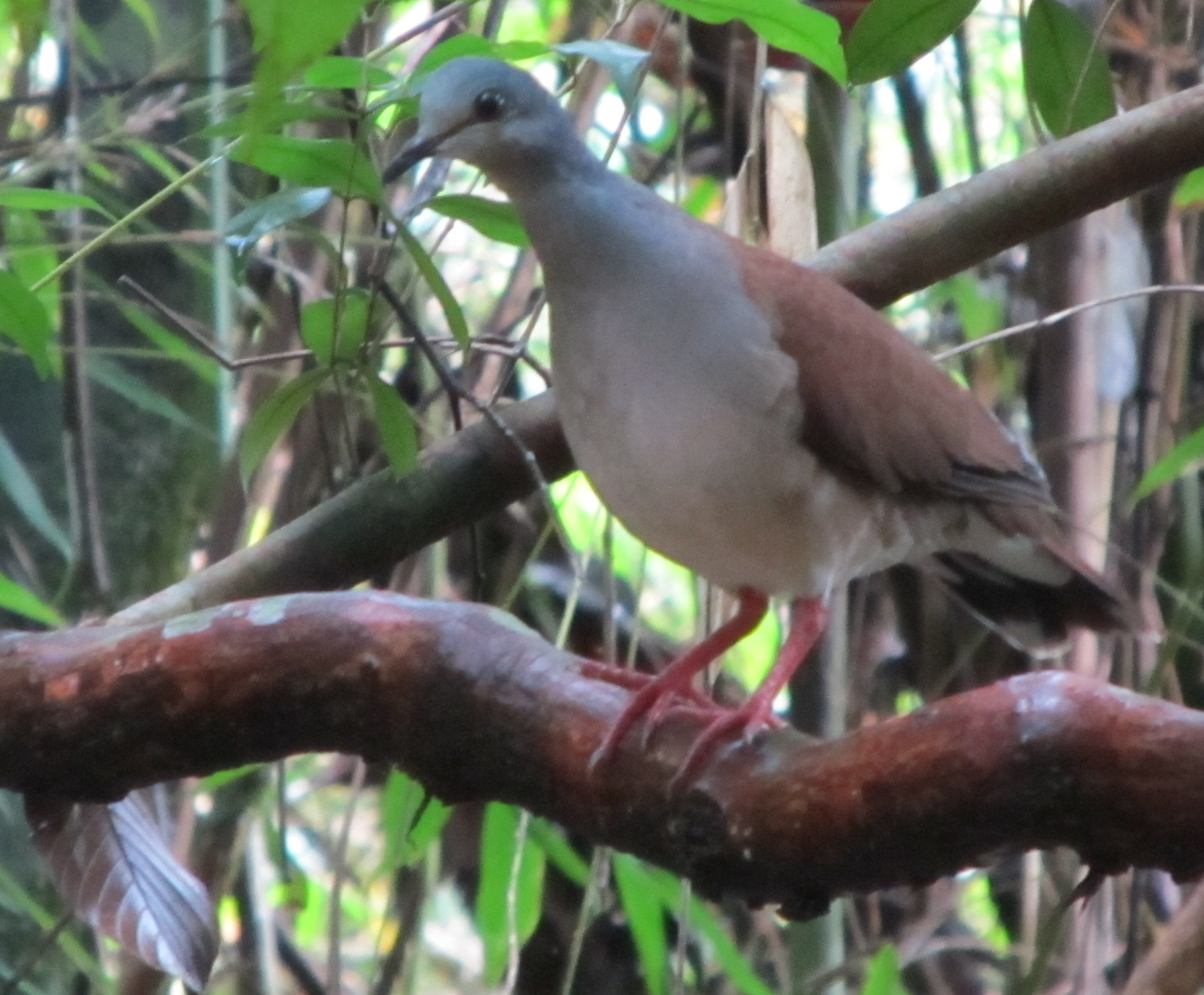

Conservation status
- Vulnerable (IUCN 3.1)

Scientific classification
- Kingdom: Animalia
- Phylum: Chordata
- Class: Aves
- Order: Columbiformes
- Family: Columbidae
- Genus: Leptotila
- Species: L. battyi

Binomial name
- Leptotila battyi Rothschild, 1901

= Azuero dove =

Species of bird

The Azuero dove or brown-backed dove (Leptotila battyi) is a species of bird in the family Columbidae. It is endemic to Panama.

== Taxonomy and systematics ==
The Azuero dove, the grey-fronted dove (Leptotila rufaxilla) and pallid dove (L. pallida) of South America, the grey-headed dove (L. plumbeiceps) of South and Central America, and the Grenada dove (L. wellsi) of Grenada were at one time thought to be a single species.

The International Ornithological Committee (IOC) and the Handbook of the Birds of the World (HBW) recognize two subspecies, the nominate L. b. battyi and L. l. malae. The American Ornithological Society (AOS) and the Clements taxonomy include those subspecies in the grey-headed dove.

== Description ==
The Azuero dove is 23.5 to 25.5 cm (9.3 to 10.0 in) long. The adult male of the nominate subspecies has a pale gray forehead, a slate gray crown and nape, and a brownish gray hindneck. The rest of the face and the throat are reddish gray. The breast is shades of pink and the belly and vent white. The upperparts are chestnut brown. The central tail feathers are also chestnut brown and the outer ones brownish black with brownish white tips. The eye is yellow or greenish yellow surrounded by bare red skin. The bill is black and the legs and feet are dull red or pinkish red. The adult female is very similar but duller on the back and breast. The juvenile's forehead, crown, neck, and upper breast are brown with cinnamon markings. Adults of L. l. malae are mostly a darker brown than the nominate and are paler gray on the head and breast.

== Distribution and habitat ==
The nominate subspecies of Azuero dove is found only on Coiba Island off the south-central Panamanian coast. L. l. malae is found on the Pacific slope of west central Panama and Cébaco Island off its shore. It inhabits tall forest and wooded swamps. On the mainland it is mostly found in hilly areas including Cerro Hoya but has a wider elevational range on Coiba.

== Behavior ==
=== Feeding ===
The Azuero dove forages on the ground, usually in groups of two or three, but little else is known about its feeding habits or diet.

=== Breeding ===
Essentially nothing is known about the Azuero dove's breeding phenology.

=== Vocalization ===
The Azuero dove's advertising call is "a repeated single cooing note".

== Status ==
The IUCN has assessed the Azuero dove as Vulnerable. It has a very small and fragmented range and its mainland habitat is shrinking, though on Coiba the habitat is reverting to forest from pasture and agriculture.
