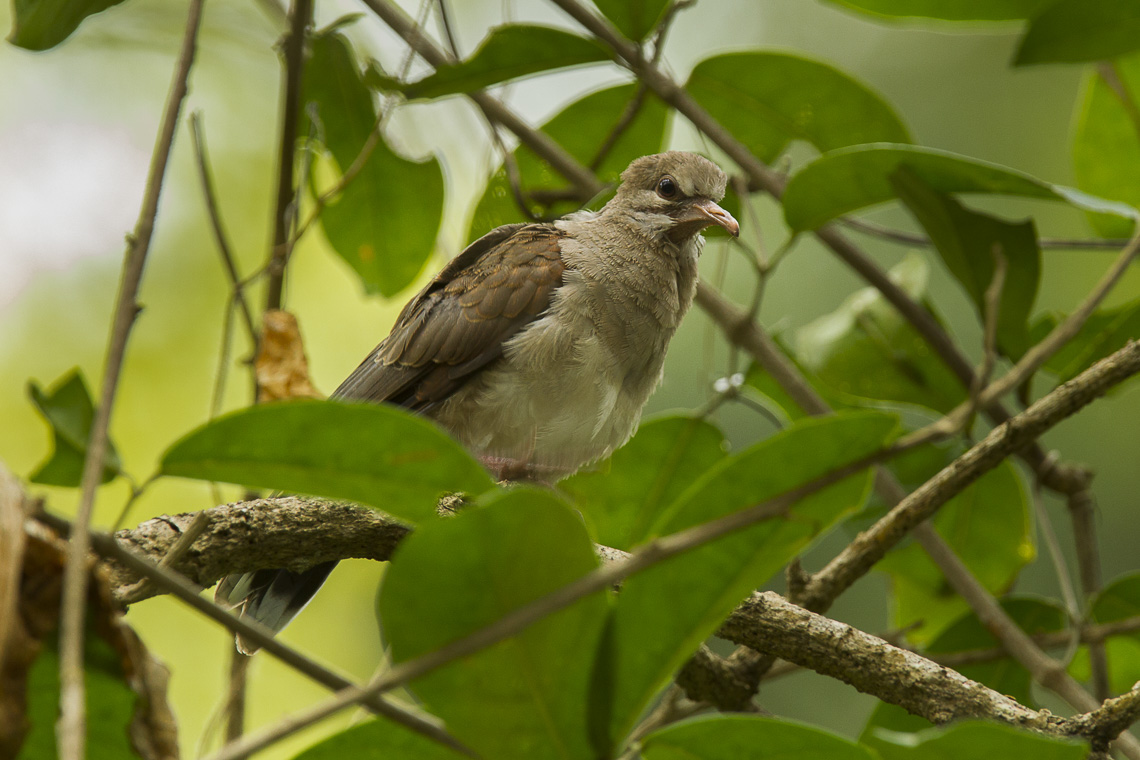

Conservation status
- Least Concern (IUCN 3.1)

Scientific classification
- Kingdom: Animalia
- Phylum: Chordata
- Class: Aves
- Order: Columbiformes
- Family: Columbidae
- Genus: Leptotila
- Species: L. pallida

Binomial name
- Leptotila pallida Berlepsch & Taczanowski, 1884

= Pallid dove =

Species of bird

The pallid dove (Leptotila pallida) is a species of bird in the family Columbidae. It is found in Colombia, Ecuador, and Peru.

== Taxonomy and systematics ==
The pallid dove is monotypic. It, the grey-fronted dove (Leptotila rufaxilla) of South America, the grey-headed dove (L. plumbeiceps) of South and Central America, the Azuero dove (Leptotila battyi) of Panama, and the Grenada dove (L. wellsi) of Grenada were at one time thought to be a single species. It has also been treated as a subspecies of grey-fronted dove.

== Description ==
The pallid dove is 23 to 26 cm (9.1 to 10.2 in) long. The male has a white forehead, face, and throat, a gray crown, and a purplish gray nape and hindneck. The sides of the neck and the breast are pale red and the belly white. Its upperparts are chestnut-brown with some chestnut-red markings. The hindneck and upper mantle have some purple iridescence. The outer tail feathers are dark chestnut with white tips. The eye is yellow and surrounded by bare red skin. The bill is black and the legs and feet pinkish red to brownish red. The female has less of a reddish tone on the upperparts and its pink and gray areas are duller.

== Distribution and habitat ==
The pallid dove is found in the tropical lowlands of western South America, from the Chocó Department of west-central Colombia through Ecuador into far northwestern Peru's Department of Tumbes. It is a bird of the Chocó bioregion of endemism, where it inhabits both primary and secondary tropical evergreen forest and dryer semi-deciduous woodland. In elevation it ranges from sea level up to 800 m (2,600 ft).

== Behavior ==
=== Feeding ===
The pallid dove is usually seen singly or in pairs. Very little is known about its foraging habits or diet, but it has been recorded feeding on the ground and eating bananas at a feeder.

=== Breeding ===
Essentially nothing is known about the pallid dove's breeding phenology.

=== Vocalization ===
The pallid dove's song is "a single mournful monotonous note 'wooOOOoo' which fades in and out" and is very similar to that of the grey-fronted dove.

== Status ==
The IUCN has assessed the pallid dove as being of Least Concern. It has a fairly large range, is reportedly locally common throughout it, and occurs in several protected areas. However, its biology and ecology are poorly known.
