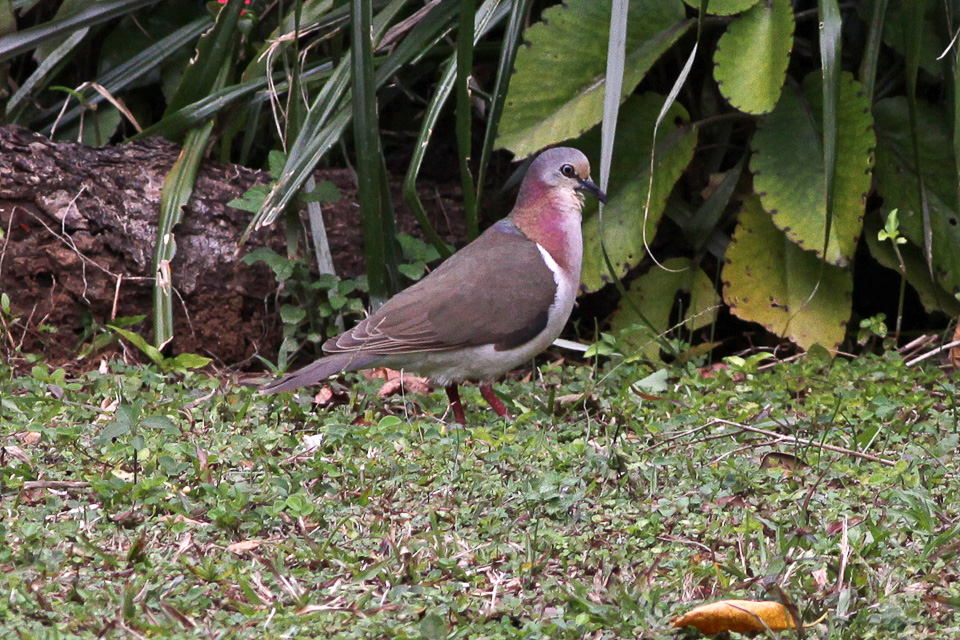

Conservation status
- Least Concern (IUCN 3.1)

Scientific classification
- Kingdom: Animalia
- Phylum: Chordata
- Class: Aves
- Order: Columbiformes
- Family: Columbidae
- Genus: Leptotila
- Species: L. jamaicensis

Binomial name
- Leptotila jamaicensis (Linnaeus, 1766)

Synonyms
- Columba jamaicensis Linnaeus, 1766

= Caribbean dove =

Species of bird

The Caribbean dove (Leptotila jamaicensis) is a species of bird in the family Columbidae. It is found in Belize, the Cayman Islands, Colombia (San Andrés island), Honduras (Bay Islands), Jamaica, and Mexico (Yucatán Peninsula). It has been introduced to the Bahamas.

== Taxonomy and systematics ==
In the 18th century, the Caribbean dove was described under the name "white-bellied dove" by several naturalists including John Ray in 1713, Hans Sloane in 1725 and Patrick Browne in 1756. In 1760, the French zoologist Mathurin Jacques Brisson included a description of the Caribbean dove in his six volume Ornithologie. He used the French name Le pigeon de la Jamaïque and the Latin Columba jamaicensis. Although Brisson coined Latin names for species, these do not conform to the binomial system and are not recognised by the International Commission on Zoological Nomenclature. When in 1766 the Swedish naturalist Carl Linnaeus updated his Systema Naturae for the twelfth edition, he included the Caribbean dove and placed it with the other pigeons in the genus Columba. Linnaeus included a brief description, used Brisson's Latin name Columba jamaicensis as the binomial name and cited the earlier authors. The species is now placed in the genus Leptotila that was introduced by the English naturalist William Swainson in 1837 with the Caribbean dove as the type species. A molecular genetic study has shown that the Caribbean dove is most closely related to the white-tipped dove (L. verreauxi).

Four subspecies are recognised:

- L. j. collaris (Cory, 1886)
- L. j. gaumeri (Lawrence, 1885)
- L. j. jamaicensis (Linnaeus, 1766)
- L. j. neoxena (Cory, 1887)

== Description ==
The Caribbean dove is 29 to 33 cm (11 to 13 in) long and weighs 117 to 190 g (4.1 to 6.7 oz). The adult male of the nominate subspecies has a white forehead, face, and throat; a gray hindcrown; and an iridescent purple nape. The mantle and the sides of the neck are rosy red with an iridescent green and/or purple gloss. The entire underparts are white. The upperparts are olive-brown with a white band showing in front of the folded wing. The tail's inner feathers are grayish brown and the outer ones black with white tips. The eye is white or white with a red ring and is surrounded by bare dull purple skin. The legs and feet are red. The female is similar to the male but with duller iridescence. Juveniles are similar to the adults but duller and many feathers have reddish edges.

L. j. collaris is similar to the nominate subspecies but is smaller on average. L. j. gaumeri is slightly smaller than the nominate; its upperparts' olive cast is darker, the breast has a reddish cast, and the iridescence is less bright. L. j. neoxena is intermediate in size and color between the nominate and L. j. gaumeri.

== Distribution and habitat ==
The subspecies of the Caribbean dove are found thus:

- L. j. collaris - Cayman Islands
- L. j. gaumeri - Mexico's northern Yucatán Peninsula, Isla Mujeres, Isla Holbox, and Cozumel; Belize's Ambergris Caye; Barbareta, Roatán, and Little Hog islands of Honduras
- L. j. jamaicensis - Jamaica; introduced to New Providence, Bahamas
- L. j. neoxena - Colombia's San Andrés island off eastern Nicaragua

In most of its range, the Caribbean dove inhabits semi-arid lowlands, with a preference for areas with some shrub or tree cover. In Jamaica, it inhabits dry limestone forest, especially foothills secondary forest, and is found as high as 2,000 m (6,600 ft) in the Blue Mountains.

== Behavior ==
=== Feeding ===
The Caribbean dove forages on the ground. In Jamaica, it has been documented feeding on seeds and small snails.

=== Breeding ===
The Caribbean dove's breeding season spans from March to May. It usually places its nest low to the ground in a tree or shrub, but has nested higher and on the ground. Its usual clutch is two eggs.

=== Vocalization ===
The Caribbean dove's song is "a rather rhythmic series of four mournful monotonous notes, with emphasis on the last one 'wo-o-o-oooooo'."

== Status ==
The IUCN has assessed the Caribbean dove as being of Least Concern. Though it is uncommon on several of the smaller islands in its range, it is locally common in Jamaica and common on the Yucatán Peninsula.
