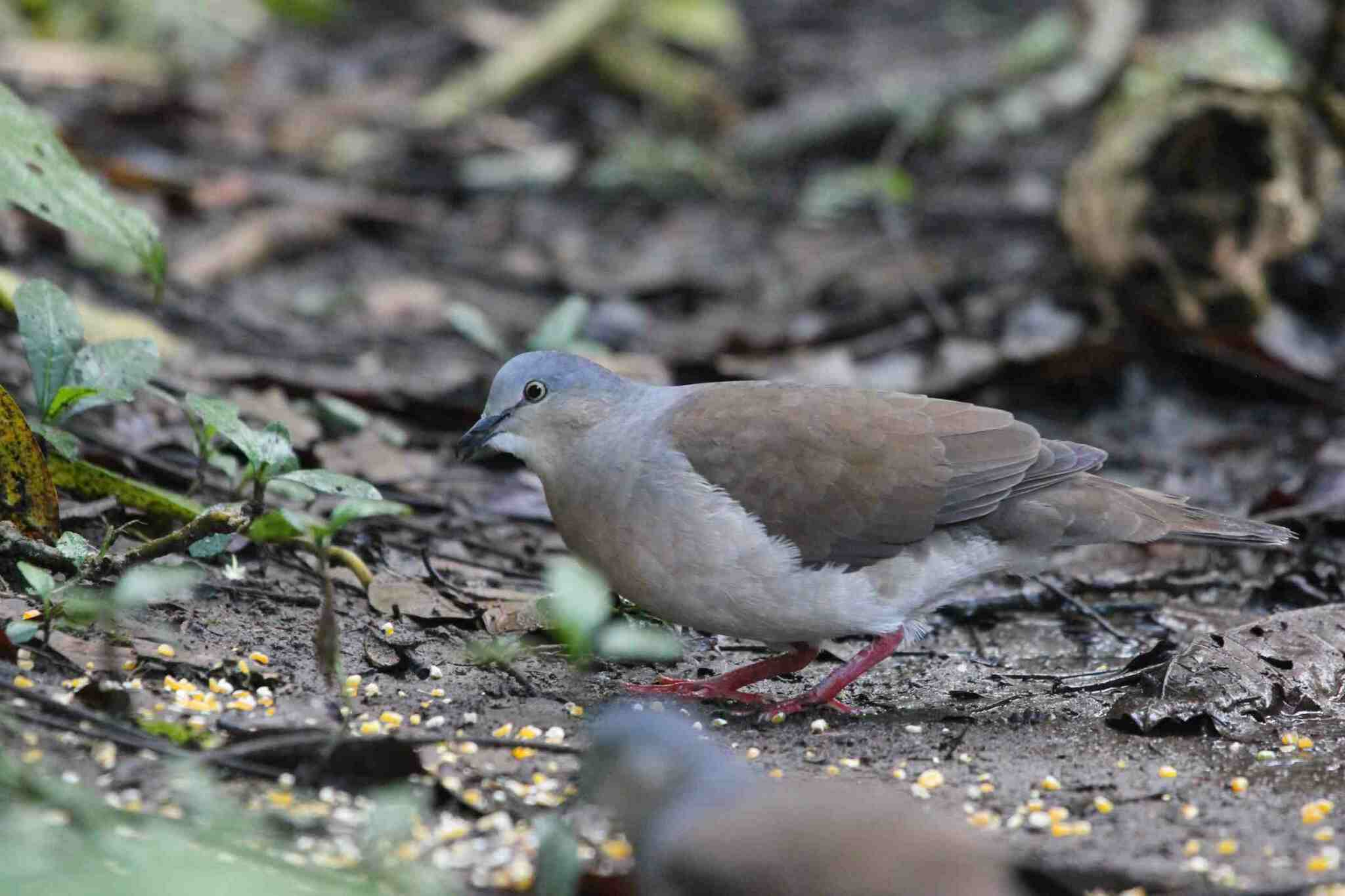

Conservation status
- Least Concern (IUCN 3.1)

Scientific classification
- Kingdom: Animalia
- Phylum: Chordata
- Class: Aves
- Order: Columbiformes
- Family: Columbidae
- Genus: Leptotila
- Species: L. plumbeiceps

Binomial name
- Leptotila plumbeiceps Sclater, PL & Salvin, 1868

= Grey-headed dove =

Species of bird

The grey-headed dove (Leptotila plumbeiceps) is a large New World dove. It is found from eastern Mexico to Colombia.

== Taxonomy and systematics ==
The grey-headed dove, the grey-fronted dove (Leptotila rufaxilla) and pallid dove (L. pallida) of South America, the Azuero dove (L. battyi) of Central America, and the Grenada dove (L. wellsi) of Grenada were at one time thought to be a single species. Grey-headed dove, grey-fronted dove, and pallid dove are possibly a superspecies.

The International Ornithological Committee (IOC) and the Handbook of the Birds of the World (HBW) recognize two subspecies, the nominate L. p. plumbiceps and L. p. notia. They also recognize the Azuero dove (L. battyi) with two subspecies, which the American Ornithological Society (AOS) and the Clements taxonomy include in the grey-headed dove.

== Description ==
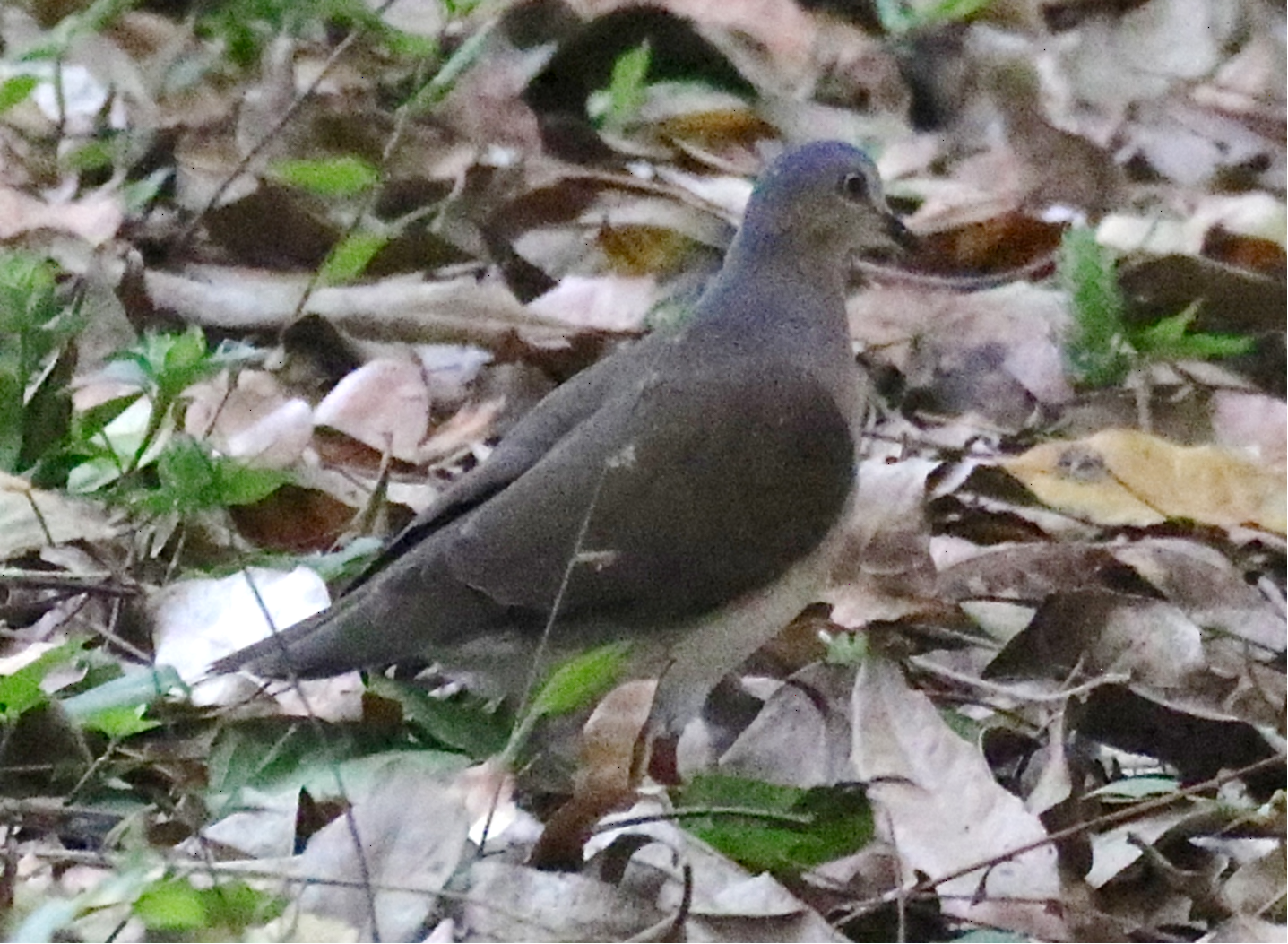
Chan Chich Lodge area - Belize

The grey-headed dove is 23.5 to 26 cm (9.3 to 10.2 in) long and weighs 139 to 205 g (4.9 to 7.2 oz). The adult male of the nominate subspecies has a pale bluish gray forehead and a slightly darker crown, nape, upper mantle, and sides of the neck. The rest of the face is pinkish buff. The throat and belly are white and the breast is pale pink. The upperparts are olive brown with a rufous wash. The central tail feathers are dark olive brown and the outer three are black with white tips. The bill is black and the legs and feet are pink. The adult female is very similar, with the addition of a wash of grayish fawn on the breast. The juvenile is a more intense olive above than the adult and its breast has a barred appearance. Adults of L. p. notia are darker than the nominate and their upperparts are more olive.

== Distribution and habitat ==
The nominate subspecies of grey-headed dove is found from eastern Mexico south to northern Nicaragua and discontinuously in southern Nicaragua, northwestern Costa Rica, and the western Andes of Colombia. L. p. notia is found on the Caribbean slope of western Panama.

The grey-headed dove inhabits the interior and edges of humid forest, both primary and secondary. In Colombia it appears to prefer dryer forest types. In elevation it ranges from sea level to 900 m (3,000 ft) in most of Central America, but is found as high as 1,500 m (4,900 ft) in Honduras. In Colombia it is mostly found between 1,000 and 1,800 m (3,300 and 5,900 ft) and up to 2,600 m (8,500 ft) on Puracé, an active volcano.

== Behavior ==
=== Feeding ===
No information has been published about the grey-headed dove's foraging behavior or diet.

=== Breeding ===
Specimens of grey-headed dove in breeding condition were taken in January on Puracé, but nothing else is known about the species' breeding phenology.

=== Vocalization ===
The grey-headed dove's song is "a single mournful monotonous note 'wooOOOoo' which fades in and out."

== Status ==
The IUCN has assessed the grey-headed dove as being of Least Concern. It has a large range and is considered to be fairly common to common in most of it but uncommon in Colombia. Its biology and ecology remain virtually unknown.

== Additional reading ==
- Stiles and Skutch, A guide to the birds of Costa Rica ISBN 0-8014-9600-4
