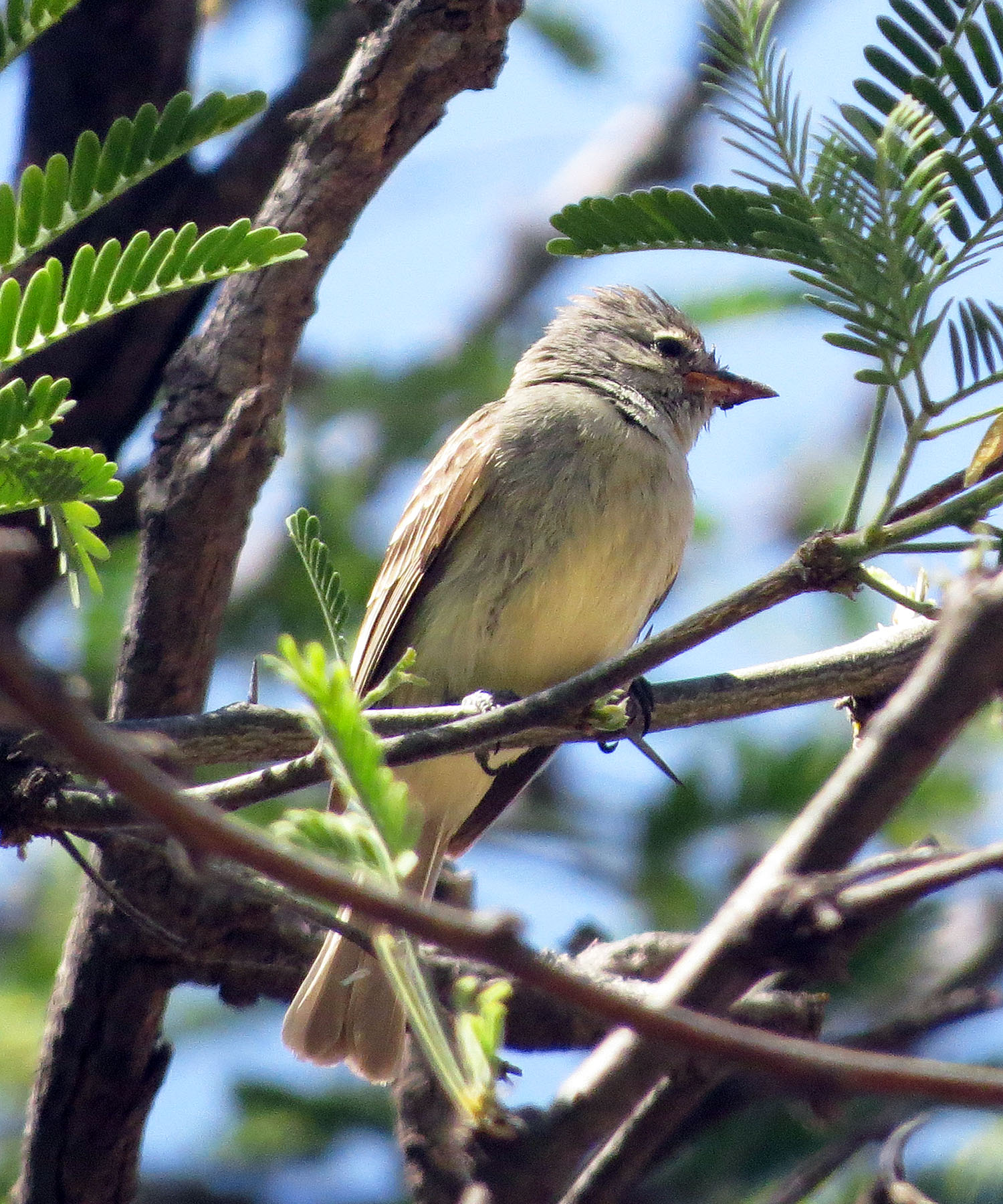

Conservation status
- Least Concern (IUCN 3.1)

Scientific classification
- Kingdom: Animalia
- Phylum: Chordata
- Class: Aves
- Order: Passeriformes
- Family: Tyrannidae
- Genus: Camptostoma
- Species: C. imberbe

Binomial name
- Camptostoma imberbe Sclater, PL, 1857
- Breeding Year-round

= Northern beardless tyrannulet =

Species of bird

The northern beardless tyrannulet (Camptostoma imberbe) is a small passerine bird in the tyrant flycatcher family. It breeds from southeasternmost Arizona and Texas of the United States through Mexico and Central America to northwestern Costa Rica.

== Taxonomy ==
The northern beardless tyrannulet was formally described in 1857 by the English zoologist Philip Sclater based on a specimen collected near San Andrés Tuxtla in the Mexican state of Veracruz. Sclater coined the binomial name Camptostoma imberbe where the specific epithet is from Latin imberbis meaning "beardless". Sclater explained: "The specific name imberbe refers to the entire absence of rictal bristles."

Two subspecies are recognised:

- C. i. imberbe Sclater, 1857 – southeastern Arizona to southern Texas, western Mexico, and northern Costa Rica
- C. i. thyellophilum Parkes & Phillips, 1999 – Yucatán Peninsula including the island of Cozumel

== Description ==
The northern beardless tyrannulet is 10.2 cm (4.0 in) long, and weighs 7.5 g (0.26 oz). The head is dark brown with an erectile crest and pale supercilium. The upperparts are grey-green becoming paler on the rump. The wings are brown with yellow feather-edging and two whitish wing bars. The tail is brown, the throat grey, the breast yellowish, and the abdomen yellow. The bill is pinkish. Sexes are similar, and this species always appears not as bright, especially with regard to the wing bars, as the closely related Panama beardless tyrannulet, Camptostoma flaviventre, with which it was once considered conspecific. However, the two forms overlap without interbreeding in Costa Rica.

The call is a loud whistled Fleeeeeerrr, sometimes broken up as a fleeer-it, or a flee-flee-flee-flee. In courtship, or when alarmed, the crests are raised, the tail flicked, and an excited call is made.

== Behaviour ==
=== Breeding ===
This species is found in light forests, cultivation and gardens with trees. The domed nest is made of plant fibre or leaves with a side entrance. The nest is placed by a tree fork. The typical clutch is two white eggs, which are marked with rufous and lilac mostly at the larger end. Incubation by the female is 14–15 days to hatching, with another 17 days to fledging.

=== Food and feeding ===
Northern beardless tyrannulets are active birds, feeding in a vireo or warbler-like fashion on insects, spiders and berries.

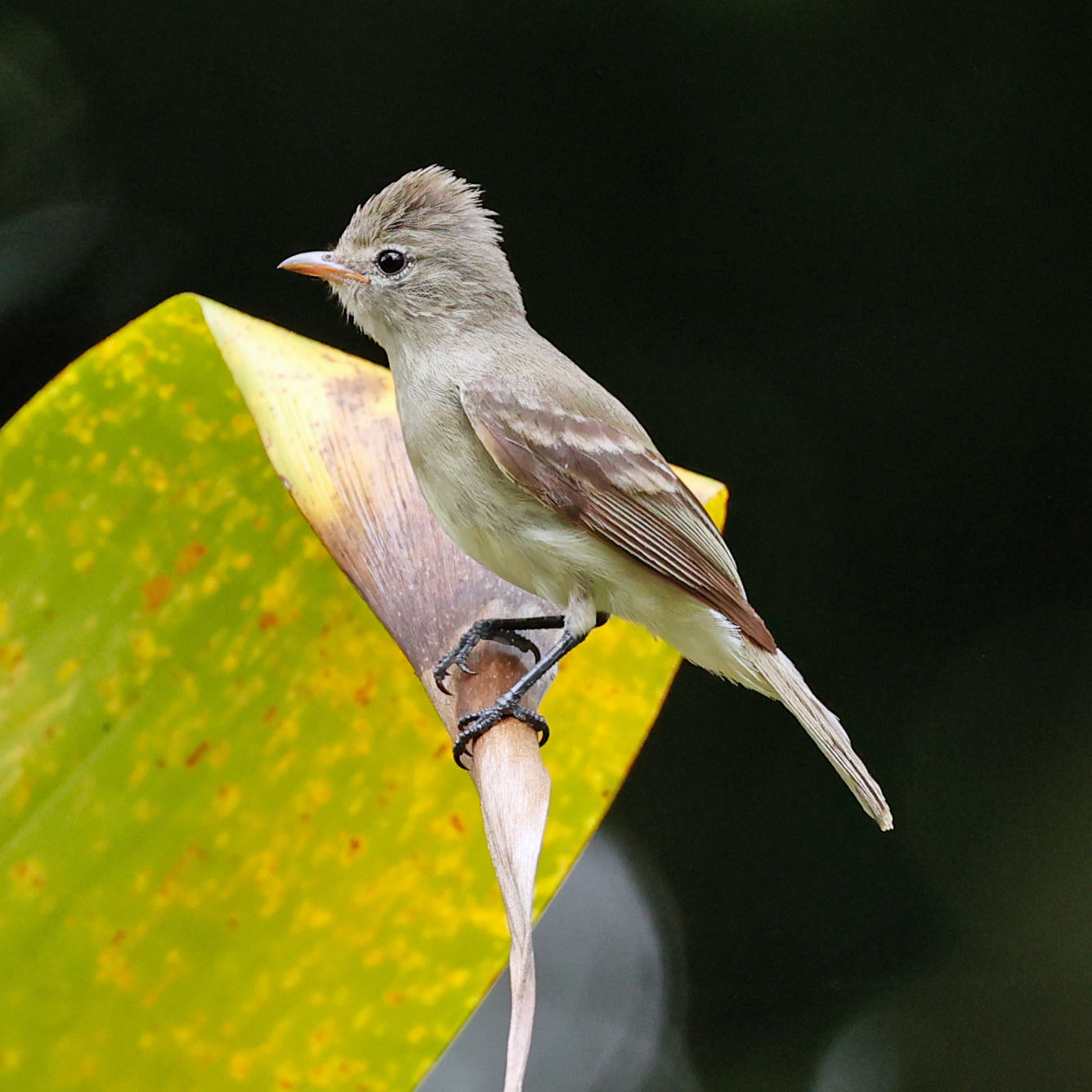
In Cano Negro, Costa Rica, on 12 March 2024.
