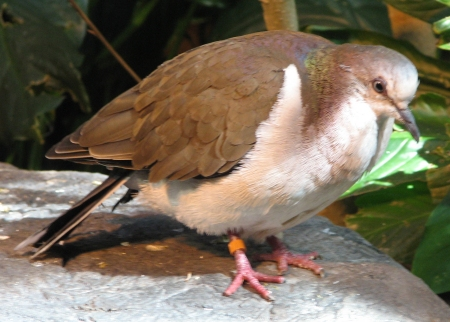
- Caribbean dove

Scientific classification
- Kingdom: Animalia
- Phylum: Chordata
- Class: Aves
- Order: Columbiformes
- Family: Columbidae
- Tribe: Zenaidini
- Genus: Leptotila; Swainson, 1837

Type species
- Peristera rufaxilla = Columba jamaicensis Selby, 1835

Species
- see text

= Leptotila =

Genus of birds

Leptotila is a genus of birds in the dove and pigeon family Columbidae. These are ground-foraging doves that live in the Americas.

== Taxonomy ==
The genus Leptotila was introduced by the English naturalist William Swainson in 1837 with the Caribbean dove Leptotila jamaicensis as the type species. The genus name combines the Ancient Greek leptos meaning "delicate" or "slender" with ptilon meaning "feather".

The genus contains the following 11 species:

- White-tipped dove, Leptotila verreauxi
- Yungas dove, Leptotila megalura
- Grey-fronted dove, Leptotila rufaxilla
- Grey-headed dove, Leptotila plumbeiceps
- Pallid dove, Leptotila pallida
- Azuero dove, Leptotila battyi – split from the grey-headed dove
- Grenada dove, Leptotila wellsi
- Caribbean dove, Leptotila jamaicensis
- Grey-chested dove, Leptotila cassinii
- Ochre-bellied dove, Leptotila ochraceiventris
- Tolima dove, Leptotila conoveri

- Zenaidini
  - Geotrygon – 9 species
  - - - Leptotila – 11 species
      - Leptotrygon – olive-backed quail-dove
    - - Zenaida – 7 species
      - Zentrygon – 8 species

Cladogram showing the position of genera in the tribe Zenaidini.
