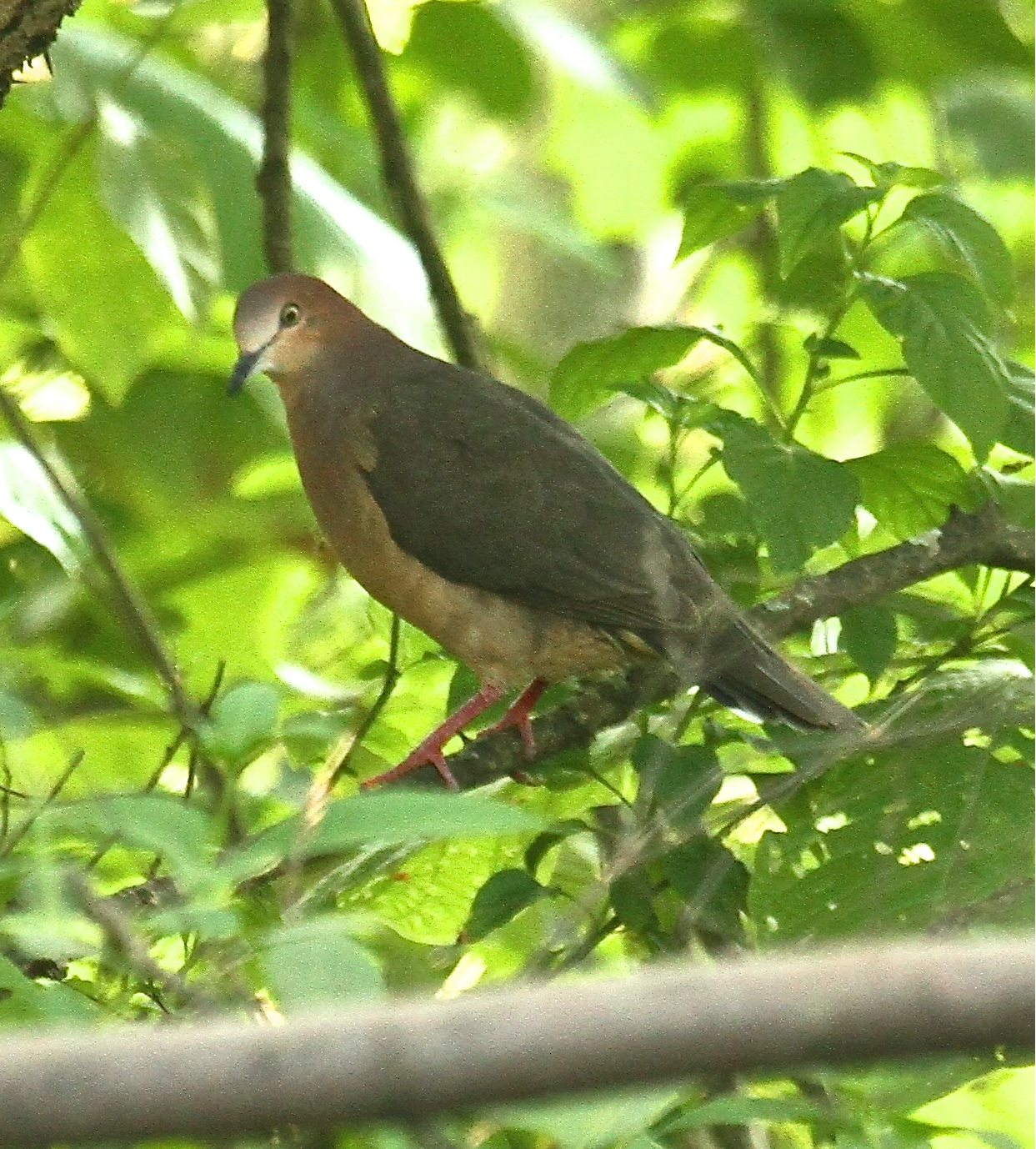

Conservation status
- Vulnerable (IUCN 3.1)

Scientific classification
- Kingdom: Animalia
- Phylum: Chordata
- Class: Aves
- Order: Columbiformes
- Family: Columbidae
- Genus: Leptotila
- Species: L. ochraceiventris

Binomial name
- Leptotila ochraceiventris Chapman, 1914

= Ochre-bellied dove =

Species of bird

The ochre-bellied dove or buff-bellied dove (Leptotila ochraceiventris) is a species of bird in the family Columbidae. It is found in Ecuador and Peru.

== Taxonomy and systematics ==
The ochre-bellied dove is monotypic. It is closely related to the grey-chested dove (Leptotila cassinii) and Tolima dove (Leptotila conoveri), and might form a superspecies with them.

== Description ==
The ochre-bellied dove is 23 to 25 cm (9.1 to 9.8 in) long and weighs about 146 g (5.1 oz). It has a whitish pink forehead, a rusty purple crown, and an iridescent purple hindneck. The rest of the upperparts are dark olive-brown with bronzy green or purple iridescence on the mantle. Its inner tail feathers are dark brown and the outer ones black with white tips. Its throat is white, its breast reddish, and its lower breast, flanks, and belly are buff. It has a yellow eye.

== Distribution and habitat ==
The ochre-bellied dove is found in the lowlands of western Ecuador and separately in the lowlands and Andes of southwestern Ecuador into northwestern Peru. It is a year round resident in some parts of its range but apparently makes seasonal movements in other parts. It inhabits a variety of landscapes including moist evergreen, semi-deciduous, and dry deciduous forests; lower montane forest; and humid cloudforest. In elevation it mostly ranges between 500 and 1,800 m (1,600 and 5,900 ft) but has been found as low as 80 m (260 ft) and as high as 2,625 m (8,612 ft).

== Behavior ==
=== Feeding ===
The ochre-bellied dove usually forages on the forest floor and up to 4 m (13 ft) above it. Its diet is not well known but it has been observed eating fruit plucked from trees. It is usually found alone or in pairs but also in groups of up to five with other doves at drinking pools.

=== Breeding ===
The ochre-bellied dove's breeding phenology is almost unknown. Based on observations of song activity and birds in breeding condition, it appears to nest between January and April and again in August and September.

=== Vocalization ===
The ochre-bellied dove's song is "a quite distinctive single slightly downslurred note 'wOOOooo', with a clear emphasis in the beginning, then gradually fading out."

== Status ==
The IUCN originally assessed the ochre-bellied dove as being Threatened but since 1994 has classed it as Vulnerable. It has a small population that is believed to be declining because of habitat loss. However, because it is tolerant of degraded habitats, the rate of decline might be slower than thought.
