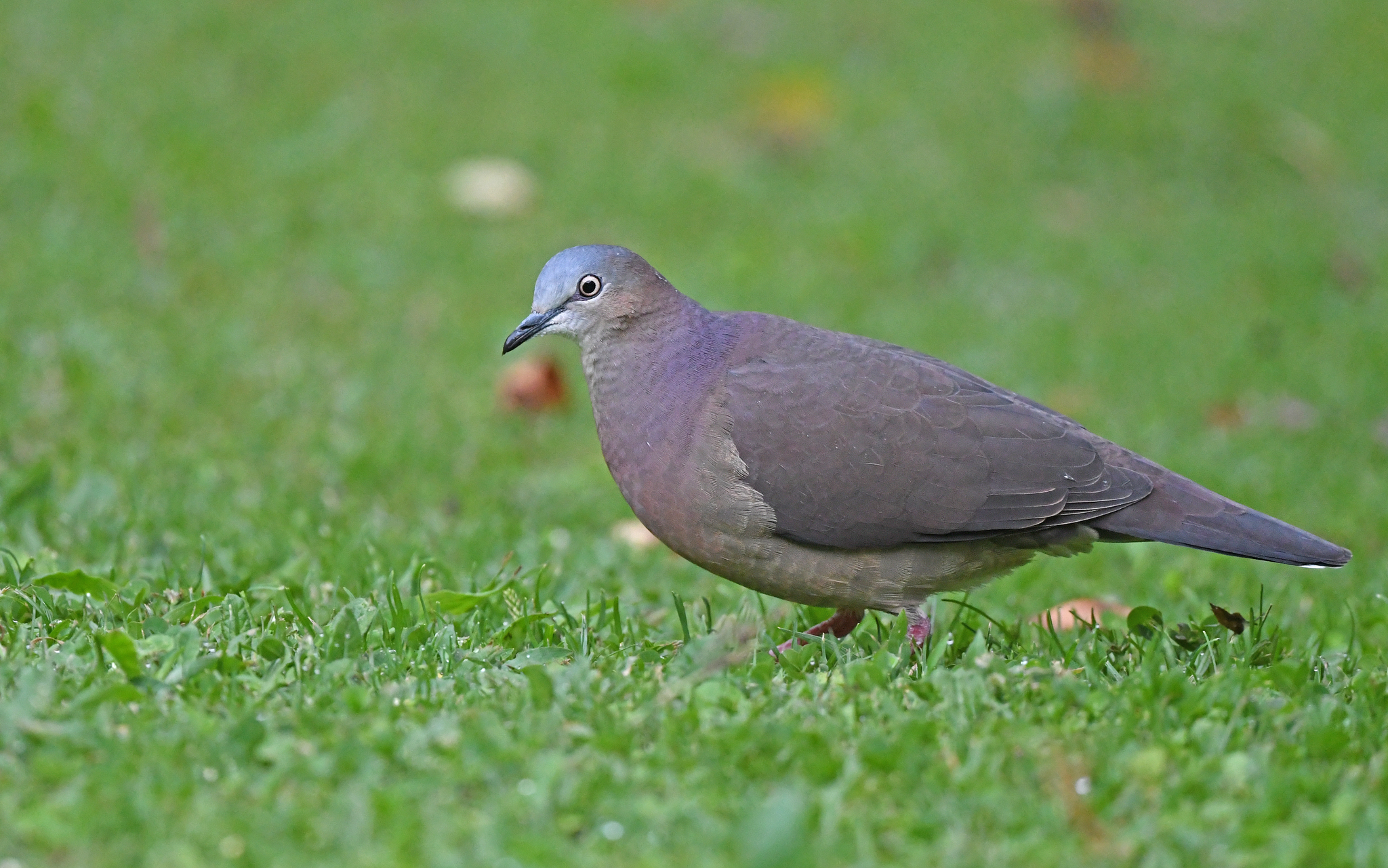

Conservation status
- Near Threatened (IUCN 3.1)

Scientific classification
- Kingdom: Animalia
- Phylum: Chordata
- Class: Aves
- Order: Columbiformes
- Family: Columbidae
- Genus: Leptotila
- Species: L. conoveri

Binomial name
- Leptotila conoveri Bond & Meyer de Schauensee, 1943

= Tolima dove =

Species of bird

The Tolima dove (Leptotila conoveri) is a species of bird in the family Columbidae. It is endemic to Colombia.

== Taxonomy and systematics ==
The Tolima dove is monotypic. It is closely related to the grey-chested dove (Leptotila cassinii) and ochre-bellied dove (Leptotila ochraceiventris), and might form a superspecies with them.

== Description ==
The Tolima dove is 22.5 to 25 cm (8.9 to 9.8 in) long. It has a blue-gray to dark gray crown and a reddish hindneck with a violet gloss. Its upper mantle is reddish gray overlain with iridescent violet and the rest of the upperparts are dark gray with purple iridescence. The wings are browner and the tail is slaty with white tips on the outer feathers. The throat is white and the breast reddish pink with a sharp division between it and the buff lower breast and belly.

== Distribution and habitat ==
The Tolima dove was believed to be limited to the eastern slope of Colombia's central Andes in Tolima and Huila Departments. In 2014 it was discovered in Cundinamarca Department in the eastern Andes. It mostly inhabits the interior and edges of humid subtropical forest, in an elevation range of 1,200 to 2,500 m (3,900 to 8,200 ft). However, in the canyon of the Combeima River it is found in disturbed areas including coffee plantations and near human habitation.

== Behavior ==
=== Feeding ===
The Tolima dove has been reported as feeding mainly on Bocconia frutescens seeds but nothing else is known about its diet or foraging habits.

=== Breeding ===
Observations of Tolima doves in breeding condition, eggs, and nestlings indicate a nesting season that extends at least from March to September. It builds a shallow bowl nest of heavy twigs in bushes or small trees, usually no more than 2 m (6.6 ft) above the ground. The clutch size is two eggs.

=== Vocalization ===
The Tolima dove's song is "a single slightly over-slurred note "wooOOOooo", with a clear emphasis in the middle."

== Status ==
The IUCN originally assessed the Tolima dove as Threatened, then from 1994 as Endangered, and in 2020 as Near Threatened. It has a restricted range and its population appears to be fragmented. Much of its original habitat has been destroyed but the species appears to adapt to secondary forest and coffee plantations.
