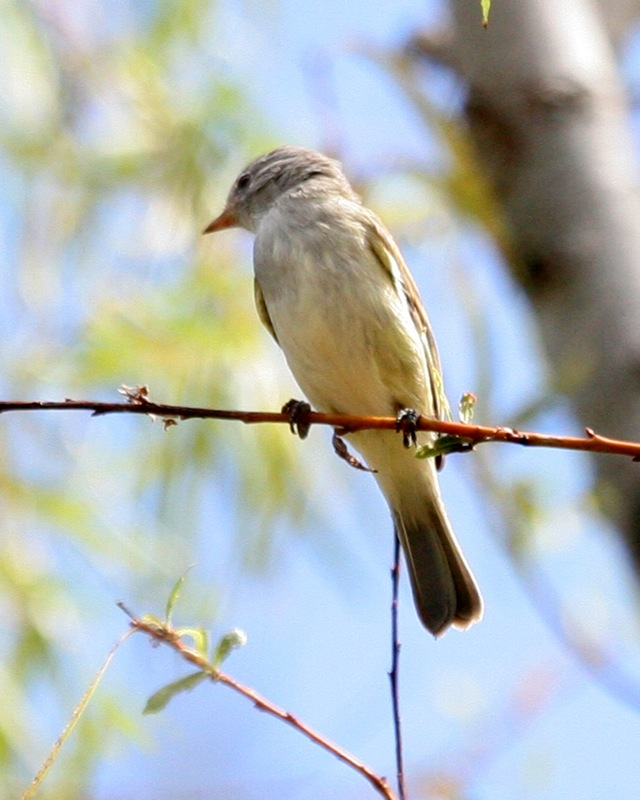
- Southeastern beardless tyrannulet (Camptostoma obsoletum)

Scientific classification
- Kingdom: Animalia
- Phylum: Chordata
- Class: Aves
- Order: Passeriformes
- Family: Tyrannidae
- Genus: Camptostoma; P.L. Sclater, 1857

Type species
- Camptostoma imberbe P.L. Sclater, 1857

= Camptostoma =

Genus of birds

Camptostoma is a genus of birds in the tyrant flycatcher family Tyrannidae. These are very small passerine birds which breed in the tropical and subtropical Americas from the southernmost USA south to Paraguay, Bolivia, and Argentina. These are species of light forests, cultivation and gardens with trees. The domed nest is made of plant fibre or leaves with a side entrance. They are active birds, feeding in a vireo or warbler-like fashion on insects, spiders and berries.

== Taxonomy ==
The genus Camptostoma was introduced in 1857 by the English zoologist Philip Sclater to accommodate a new species, Camptostoma imberde, the northern beardless tyrannulet, which is therefore the type species by monotypy. The genus name combines the Ancient Greek καμπτος/kamptos meaning "curved" with στομα/stoma meaning "mouth".

The genus formerly contained only two species, the northern beardless tyrannulet and the southern beardless tyrannulet (Camptostoma obsoletum). In 2026 the southern beardless tyrannulet was split into six species based on differences in vocalization and plumage. With this change, the English name "southern beardless tyrannulet" was changed to "southeastern beardless tyrannulet".

The genus contains seven species:

- Cauca beardless tyrannulet, Camptostoma caucae – Colombia (western Andes, and Cauca Department and Magdalena River valleys)
- Pacific beardless tyrannulet, Camptostoma sclateri – tropical western Ecuador and western Peru (southward to Lima), including (middle Marañón River)
- Northern beardless tyrannulet, Camptostoma imberbe – southeastern Arizona to southern Texas, western Mexico, and northern Costa Rica; Cozumel
- Venezuelan beardless tyrannulet, Camptostoma pusillum – Caribbean coast of northern Colombia, northern Venezuela, and Trinidad
- Panama beardless tyrannulet, Camptostoma flaviventre – Pacific coast of southwestern Costa Rica and Panama (including Coiba, Cébaco, and Pearl islands)
- Amazonian beardless tyrannulet, Camptostoma napaeum – Amazon basin, from southeastern Colombia eastward to the Guianas and Amapá, and southward to northeastern Peru, northern Bolivia, and western Brazil (western Amazonas)
- Southeastern beardless tyrannulet, Camptostoma obsoletum – far southeastern Peru and west-central Bolivia eastward to central and eastern Brazil, and southward to north-central Argentina and Uruguay
