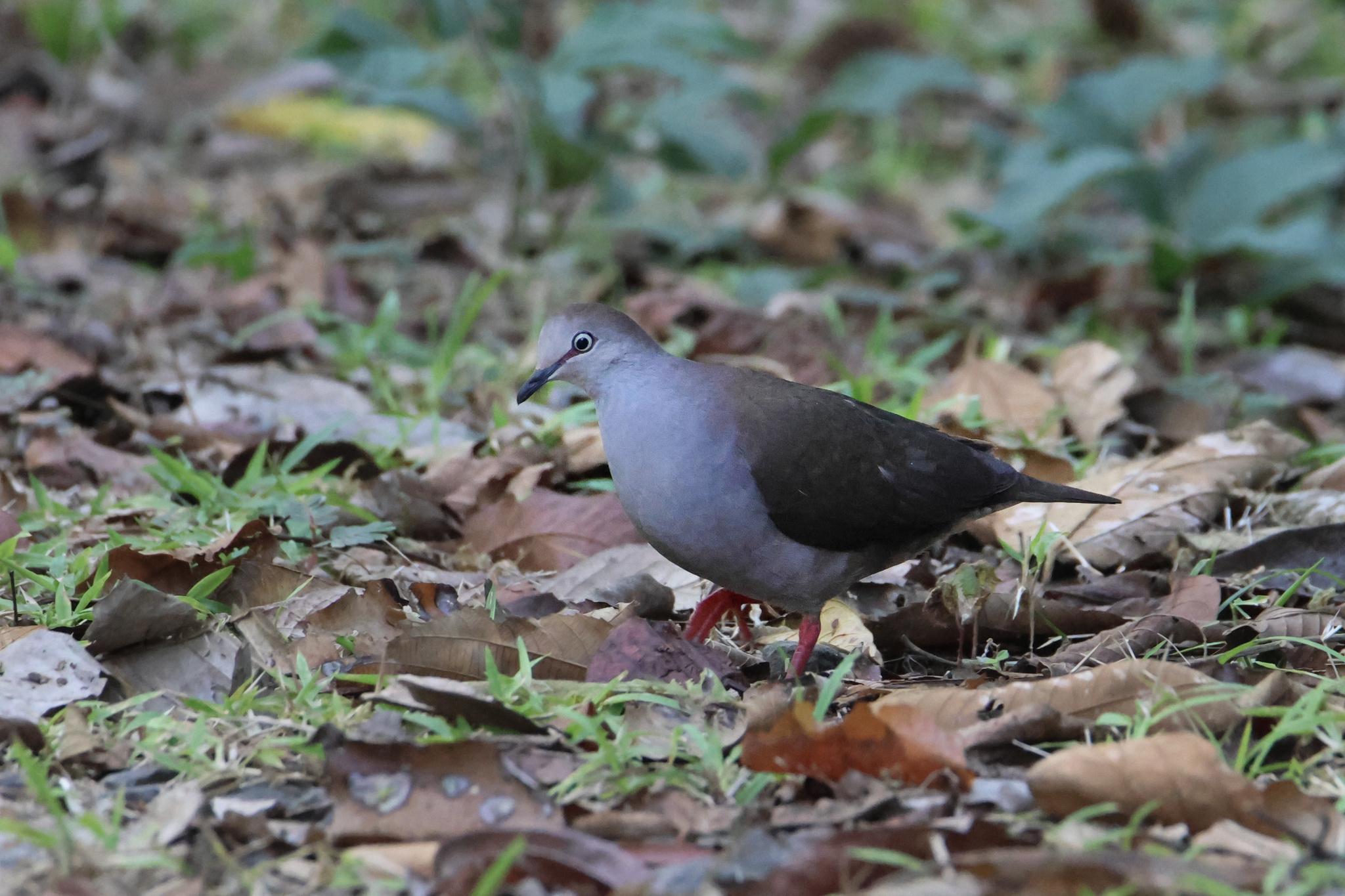

Conservation status
- Least Concern (IUCN 3.1)

Scientific classification
- Kingdom: Animalia
- Phylum: Chordata
- Class: Aves
- Order: Columbiformes
- Family: Columbidae
- Genus: Leptotila
- Species: L. cassinii

Binomial name
- Leptotila cassinii Lawrence, 1867

Synonyms
- Leptotila cassini

= Grey-chested dove =

Species of bird

The grey-chested dove (Leptotila cassinii) is a species of bird in the family Columbidae. It is found in Belize, Colombia, Costa Rica, Guatemala, Honduras, Mexico, Nicaragua, and Panama.

== Taxonomy and systematics ==
The grey-chested dove is closely related to the Tolima dove (Leptotila conoveri) and ochre-bellied dove (L. ochraceiventris), and might form a superspecies with them. It has three subspecies, the nominate L. c. cassinii, L. c. cerviniventris, and L. c. rufinucha.

== Description ==
The grey-chested dove is 22.5 to 28 cm (8.9 to 11.0 in) long and weighs 132 to 179 g (4.7 to 6.3 oz). The nominate subspecies has a pinkish gray forehead and face, dark brown crown and nape, and an iridescent grayish purple hindneck. Its upperparts are olive-brown with an iridescent green or purple mantle. The tail is darker than the back and the outer feathers have white tips. Its throat is white, the breast reddish gray, and the belly reddish. The eye is shades of yellow surrounded by bare gray skin that is reddish at its front and back. The legs and feet are red. Males and females are essentially alike but that the female is darker overall. L. c. rufinucha is paler than the nominate, with a purplish breast and a rusty buff crown and nape. L. c. cerviniventris is similar to rufinucha but the breast is a stronger purplish pink.

== Distribution and habitat ==
The nominate subspecies of grey-chested dove is found from Panama's Canal Zone into northern Colombia. L. c. cerviniventris is found from Chiapas in southeastern Mexico south through Belize, Honduras, Nicaragua, and northwestern Costa Rica into western Panama. L. c. rufinucha is found in southwestern Costa Rica and northwestern Panama. It inhabits secondary forest from sea level to at most 1,400 m (4,600 ft). On the Caribbean side of Costa Rica it is only found as high as 750 m (2,460 ft).

== Behavior ==
=== Feeding ===
The grey-chested dove forages on the ground alone or in pairs; it does not flock. Though its diet is poorly known, it has been documented eating seeds and small insects.

=== Breeding ===
The grey-chested dove's breeding season varies across its range. In Costa Rica it has two seasons, February to May and July to September. In Panama it breeds between February and September and in Colombia apparently from January to April. It builds a shallow platform nest of twigs and straw and places it from 1 to 5 m (3.3 to 16.4 ft) above ground on a tree branch or in a thicket or vine tangle. The clutch size is two eggs.

=== Vocalization ===
The grey-chested dove's song is "a single mournful monotonous note 'woOOOooo' which fades rapidly in and slowly fades out."

== Status ==
The IUCN has assessed the grey-chested dove as being of Least Concern. Though its biology and ecology are poorly known, the species is considered fairly common in most of its range.
