= Venezuelan beardless tyrannulet =

Conservation status
- Not evaluated (IUCN 3.1)

Scientific classification
- Kingdom: Animalia
- Phylum: Chordata
- Class: Aves
- Order: Passeriformes
- Family: Tyrannidae
- Genus: Camptostoma
- Species: C. pusillum

Binomial name
- Camptostoma pusillum (Cabanis & Heine, 1860)
- Range

Species of bird

The Venezuelan beardless tyrannulet (Camptostoma pusillum) is a small passerine bird in the tyrant flycatcher family Tyrannidae. It was formerly considered to be conspecific with southeastern beardless tyrannulet (Camptostoma obsoletum). It is found on the Caribbean coast of northern Colombia, northern Venezuela, and Trinidad.

== Taxonomy ==
The Venezuelan beardless tyrannulet was formally described in 1860 by the German ornithologists Jean Cabanis and Ferdinand Heine based on a specimen collected at Cartagena on the northern coast of Colombia. They coined the binomial name Myiopatis pusilla. The specific epithet is Latin meaning "tiny" or "very small". This species was formerly considered to be a subspecies of the southeastern beardless tyrannulet (Camptostoma obsoletum) (then known as the southern beardless-tyrannulet). In 2026 it was elevated to species status based on differences in vocalization and minor plumage traits.
