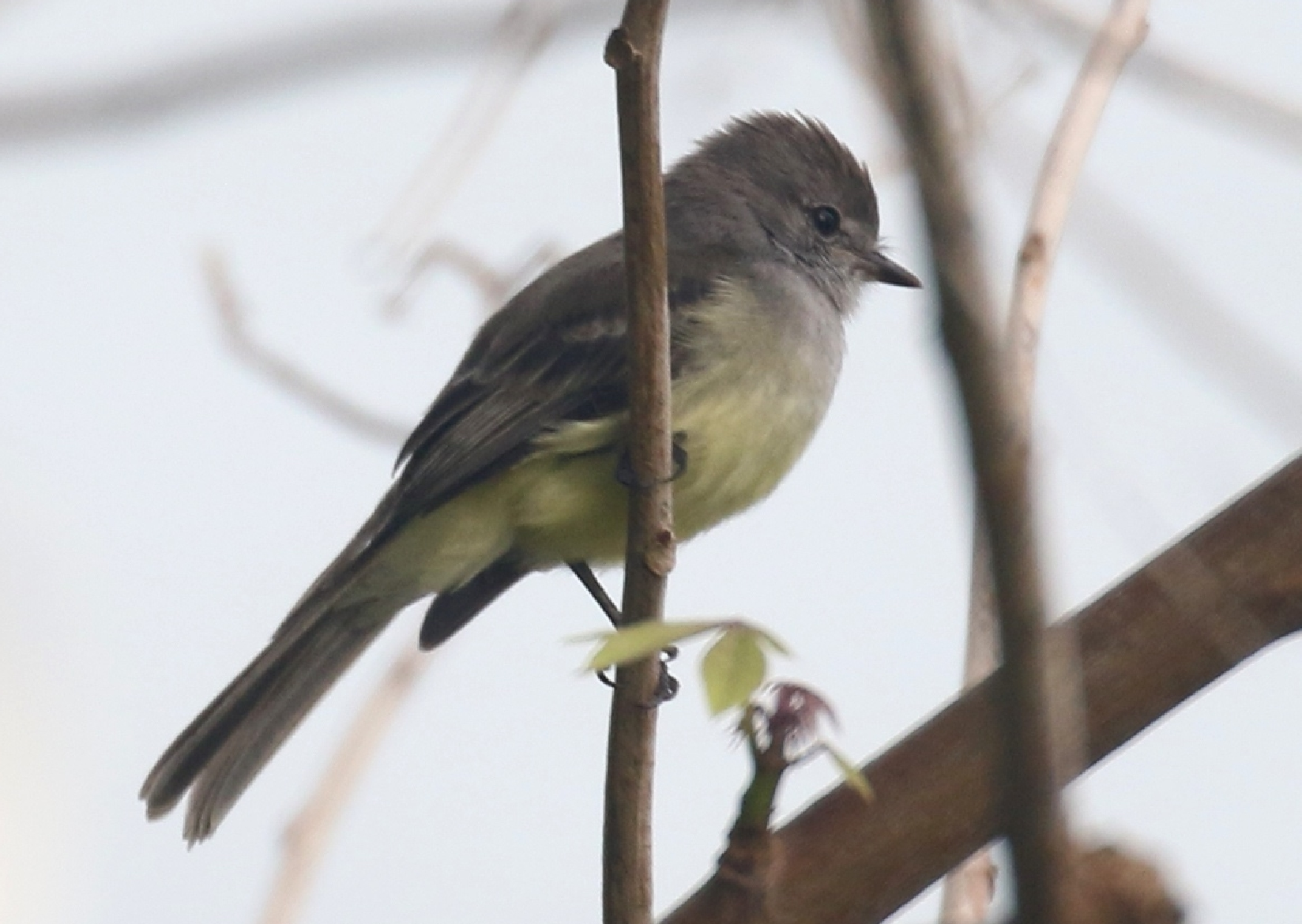
- In Panama City, Panama

Scientific classification
- Kingdom: Animalia
- Phylum: Chordata
- Class: Aves
- Order: Passeriformes
- Family: Tyrannidae
- Genus: Camptostoma
- Species: C. flaviventre

Binomial name
- Camptostoma flaviventre Sclater & Salvin, 1865
- Range

= Panama beardless tyrannulet =

Species of bird

The Panama beardless tyrannulet (Camptostoma flaviventre) is a small passerine bird in the tyrant flycatcher family Tyrannidae. It was formerly considered to be conspecific with southeastern beardless tyrannulet (Camptostoma obsoletum). It is found on the Pacific coast of Panama and southwestern Costa Rica.

== Taxonomy ==
The Panama beardless tyrannulet was formally described in 1865 by the English ornithologists Philip Sclater and Osbert Salvin based on a specimen collected in Panama, probably near Lion Hill in the Panama Canal Zone. They coined the binomial name Camptostoma flaviventre, where the specific epithet combines the Latin flavus meaning "yellow" or "golden-yellow" with venter, ventris meaning "belly". This species was formerly considered to be a subspecies of the southeastern beardless tyrannulet (Camptostoma obsoletum) (then known as the southern beardless-tyrannulet). In 2026 it was elevated to species status based on differences in vocalization and minor plumage traits.

Three subspecies are recognised:

- Camptostoma flaviventre flaviventre Sclater & Salvin, 1865 – Pacific coast of southwestern Costa Rica and Panama
- Camptostoma flaviventre orphnum Wetmore, 1957 – Coiba and Cébaco islands (western Panama)
- Camptostoma flaviventre majus Griscom, 1932 – Pearl Islands (Panama)
