= Cauca beardless tyrannulet =

Conservation status
- Not evaluated (IUCN 3.1)

Scientific classification
- Kingdom: Animalia
- Phylum: Chordata
- Class: Aves
- Order: Passeriformes
- Family: Tyrannidae
- Genus: Camptostoma
- Species: C. caucae

Binomial name
- Camptostoma caucae Chapman, 1914
- Range

Species of bird

The Cauca beardless tyrannulet (Camptostoma caucae) is a small passerine bird in the tyrant flycatcher family Tyrannidae. It was formerly considered to be conspecific with southeastern beardless tyrannulet (Camptostoma obsoletum). It is found in the valley of the Cauca River and the upper valley of the Magdalena River in western Colombia.

== Taxonomy ==
The Cauca beardless tyrannulet was formally described in 1914 by the American ornithologist Frank Chapman based on a specimen collected at an altitude of 3,500 ft (1,100 m) near the Río Frío in the Cauca Valley of Colombia. Chapman coined the binomial name Camptostoma caucae, with the specific epithet from the type location. This species was formerly considered to be a subspecies of the southeastern beardless tyrannulet (Camptostoma obsoletum) (then known as the southern beardless-tyrannulet). In 2026 it was elevated to species status based on differences in vocalization and minor plumage traits.
