= Pacific beardless tyrannulet =

Conservation status
- Not evaluated (IUCN 3.1)

Scientific classification
- Kingdom: Animalia
- Phylum: Chordata
- Class: Aves
- Order: Passeriformes
- Family: Tyrannidae
- Genus: Camptostoma
- Species: C. sclateri

Binomial name
- Camptostoma sclateri (Berlepsch & Taczanowski, 1884)
- Range

Species of bird

The Pacific beardless tyrannulet (Camptostoma sclateri) is a small passerine bird in the tyrant flycatcher family Tyrannidae that is found to the west of the Andes in Ecuador and northern Peru. It was formerly considered to be conspecific with southeastern beardless tyrannulet (Camptostoma obsoletum).

== Taxonomy ==
In 1860 the English zoologist Philip Sclater described the Pacific beardless tyrannulet based on a specimen collected by Louis Fraser at Pallatanga in Ecuador. Sclater coined the binomial name Eupsilostoma pusillum. Unfortunately this name was already occupied and in 1884 the ornithologists Hans von Berlepsch and Władysław Taczanowski coined a replacement name Ornithion sclateri. This species was formerly considered to be a subspecies of the southeastern beardless tyrannulet (Camptostoma obsoletum) (then known as the southern beardless-tyrannulet). In 2026 it was elevated to species status based on differences in vocalization and minor plumage traits.

Three subspecies are recognised:

- C. s. sclateri (Berlepsch & Taczanowski, 1884) – tropical western Ecuador and far northwestern Peru
- C. s. maranonicum Carriker, 1933 – northern Peru
- C. s. griseum Carriker, 1933 – arid littoral of western Peru
