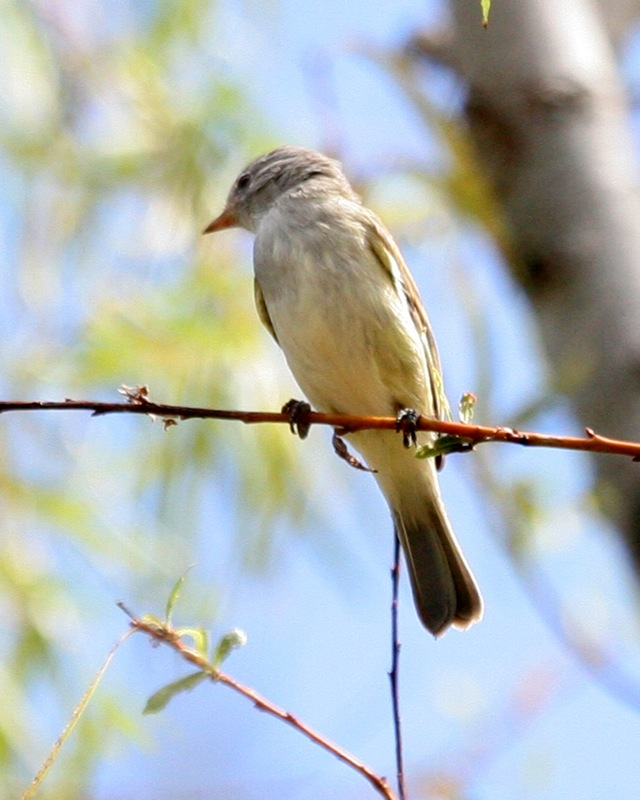

Conservation status
- Least Concern (IUCN 3.1)

Scientific classification
- Kingdom: Animalia
- Phylum: Chordata
- Class: Aves
- Order: Passeriformes
- Family: Tyrannidae
- Genus: Camptostoma
- Species: C. obsoletum

Binomial name
- Camptostoma obsoletum (Temminck, 1824)
- Range

= Southeastern beardless tyrannulet =

Southern beardless tyrannulet

Species of bird

The southeastern beardless tyrannulet or southern beardless tyrannulet (Camptostoma obsoletum) is a small passerine bird in subfamily Elaeniinae of family Tyrannidae, the tyrant flycatchers. It is found from southern Amazonia to central Argentina.

== Taxonomy ==
The southeastern beardless tyrannulet was formally described and illustrated in 1824 by the Dutch zoologist Coenraad Jacob Temminck under the binomial name Muscicapa obsoleta. The specific epithet is from Latin obsoletus meaning "plain", "worn out" or "forgotten". Temminck gave the locality as Brasil but a restricted type location of Curitiba in the Brazilian state of Paraná has been proposed.

Three subspecies are recognised:

- C. o. bolivianum Zimmer, 1941 – central Bolivia to northwestern Argentina (Tucumán)
- C. o. cinerascens (Wied-Neuwied, 1831) – eastern Bolivia and central and eastern Brazil (Maranhão to Ceará and Mato Grosso)
- C. o. obsoletum (Temminck, 1824) – southeastern Brazil to Uruguay, Paraguay, and northern Argentina

This species, under the vernacular name "southern beardless tyrannulet", formerly included 13 subspecies. In 2026 ten of the subspecies were separated to create five new species based on differences in vocalization and plumage. At the same time, the English name "southern beardless tyrannulet" was changed to "southeastern beardless tyrannulet".

The following were formerly treated as subspecies:

- Pacific beardless tyrannulet (Camptostoma sclateri)
- Venezuelan beardless tyrannulet (Camptostoma pusillum)
- Cauca beardless tyrannulet (Camptostoma caucae)
- Amazonian beardless tyrannulet (Camptostoma napaeum)
- Panama beardless tyrannulet (Camptostoma flaviventre)

== Description ==
The southeastern beardless tyrannulet is 9.5 to 10.5 cm (3.7 to 4.1 in) long and weighs 7 to 9 g (0.25 to 0.32 oz). It is a small flycatcher with a long pointed warbler-like bill. The sexes have the same plumage. Adults of the nominate subspecies C. o. obsoletum have a grayish crown and nape; the crown feathers are often bushy with dark centers. They have white lores and a broken white eyering on an otherwise grayish white face. Their upperparts and tail are medium olive-gray. Their wings are dusky with whitish to creamy edges on the inner flight feathers. Their wing coverts have cinnamon tips that show as two wide bars on the closed wing. Their throat is grayish white and the rest of their underparts mostly pale yellow with a faint olive wash on the breast. Juveniles are duller and browner than adults with pale buffish white underparts. Both sexes of all subspecies have a brown iris, a horn-colored maxilla, a dull orangish or pinkish mandible, and gray legs and feet.

The other subspecies of the southern beardless tyrannulet differ from the nominate and each other thus:

- C. o. flaviventre: warm grayish olive upperparts with somewhat darker crown, creamy white wing bars and inner flight feather edges, and deep yellow underparts
- C. o. orphnum: smallest subspecies, with very dark crown
- C. o. majus: similar to flaviventre but grayer overall with less contrasty crown
- C. o. caucae: drab grayish olive upperparts with darker crown, creamy white to pure white wing bars, and very pale yellow underparts with distinct grayish to grayish olive cast to the breast
- C. o. pusillum: like caucae but slightly smaller
- C. o. napaeum: similar to caucae and pusillum but slightly darker olive
- C. o. maranonicum: smaller and much paler than nominate, with slightly olive gray-brown upperparts, cinnamon-buff tinge to wing bars and inner flight feather edges, and creamy white underparts with a warm gray cast to the breast
- C. o. olivaceum: dark olive crown, olive upperparts, pale yellow-green to whitish wing bars, bright yellow-green edges to inner flight feathers, and bright yellow underparts
- C. o. sclateri: smaller and paler than nominate though somewhat darker than maranonicum and with dull cinnamon uppertail coverts
- C. o. griseum: smaller and paler than nominate though somewhat darker than maranonicum
- C. o. bolivianum: slightly larger than nominate
- C. o. cinerascens: like nominate with slightly paler underparts

== Distribution and habitat ==
The southern beardless tyrannulet is found in almost every habitat available in its range. These include desert with cactus, thorn-scrub, deciduous and gallery forest, the edges of humid forest, secondary forest, edges along watercourses and oxbow lakes, and parks and gardens in built-up areas. It generally shuns the interior of continuous humid forest but occasionally occurs in várzea and swamp forests.

== Behavior ==
=== Movement ===
The southeastern beardless tyrannulet is a year-round resident in almost its entire range. Part of the southern population moves northwest into southeastern Peru in the austral winter.

=== Feeding ===
The southeastern beardless tyrannulet feeds mostly on insects and spiders; berries such as those of mistletoe (Loranthaceae) and other small fruits are also a significant part of its diet. It usually forages alone or in pairs and occasionally joins mixed-species feeding flocks. It forages actively, moving frequently as it gleans prey and fruits from a perch; it occasionally takes food while briefly hovering. It feeds mostly in the crown of trees and the upper parts of lower vegetation though west of the Andes it often feeds at any level of the forest.

=== Breeding ===
The southeastern beardless tyrannulet's breeding season varies widely across its range, for instance between December and March in Central America, September to December in Suriname, and August to January in Argentina. The female alone builds the nest, a bulky globe with a side entrance made of a variety of plant materials, spider web, and cocoon cases and lined with seed down and other fine materials. It can be placed from just above the ground to as high as 30 m (100 ft) high in a tree and is typically well hidden. In a study in Ecuador, 12 of 20 nests were placed near an active wasp nest. The clutch is usually two eggs and rarely three. The incubation period is 14 to 15 days and fledging occurs about 17 days after hatch. Both parents provision nestlings.

=== Vocalization ===
The southeastern beardless tyrannulet has a variety of vocalizations. They include a "[t]hin, high whistle, 'fleeeeer', rising and falling slightly, sometimes with terminal syllables, 'fleeeeee-pit-pit' " and a "descending series of clear, minor-key notes, 'fleee, flee-fleew-fleew' ". When calling it often raises its crest. The species is highly responsive to recordings of the local species of pygmy owl, coming close and calling and fussing.

== Status ==
The IUCN has assessed the southeastern beardless tyrannulet as being of Least Concern. It has an extremely large range and its estimated population of at least 50 million mature individuals is believed to be stable. No immediate threats have been identified. It is considered fairly common to very common in most of its range. It is considered rare at the northern end of its Costa Rican range, less numerous is eastern Ecuador than western, and uncommon in northeastern Peru. "Preference for scrub, lighter woodland and semi-open habitats makes it less susceptible to forest degradation and disturbance than are many other tyrannids; able to exploit converted habitats."
