= Amazonian beardless tyrannulet =

Conservation status
- Not evaluated (IUCN 3.1)

Scientific classification
- Kingdom: Animalia
- Phylum: Chordata
- Class: Aves
- Order: Passeriformes
- Family: Tyrannidae
- Genus: Camptostoma
- Species: C. napaeum

Binomial name
- Camptostoma napaeum (Ridgway, 1888)
- Range

Species of bird

The Amazonian beardless tyrannulet (Camptostoma napaeum) is a small passerine bird in the tyrant flycatcher family Tyrannidae. It was formerly considered to be conspecific with southeastern beardless tyrannulet (Camptostoma obsoletum). It is found in the Amazon basin.

== Taxonomy ==
The Amazonian beardless tyrannulet was formally described in 1888 by the American ornithologist Robert Ridgway based on a specimen collected at Diamantina near Santarém on lower Amazon in Brazil. He coined the binomial name Ornithion napaeum where the specific epithet is from Ancient Greek ναπαιος/napaios meaning "of a wooded dell". This species was formerly considered to be a subspecies of the southeastern beardless tyrannulet (Camptostoma obsoletum) (then known as the southern beardless-tyrannulet). In 2026 it was elevated to species status based on differences in vocalization as well as minor differences in plumage.

Two subspecies are recognised:

- C. n. napaeum (Ridgway, 1888) – far south-central Venezuela to the Guianas and northern Brazil (eastern Amazonas, Pará, and Amapá)
- C. n. olivaceum (Berlepsch, 1889) – southeastern Colombia to eastern Ecuador, northeastern Peru, northern Bolivia, and western Brazil (western Amazonas)
