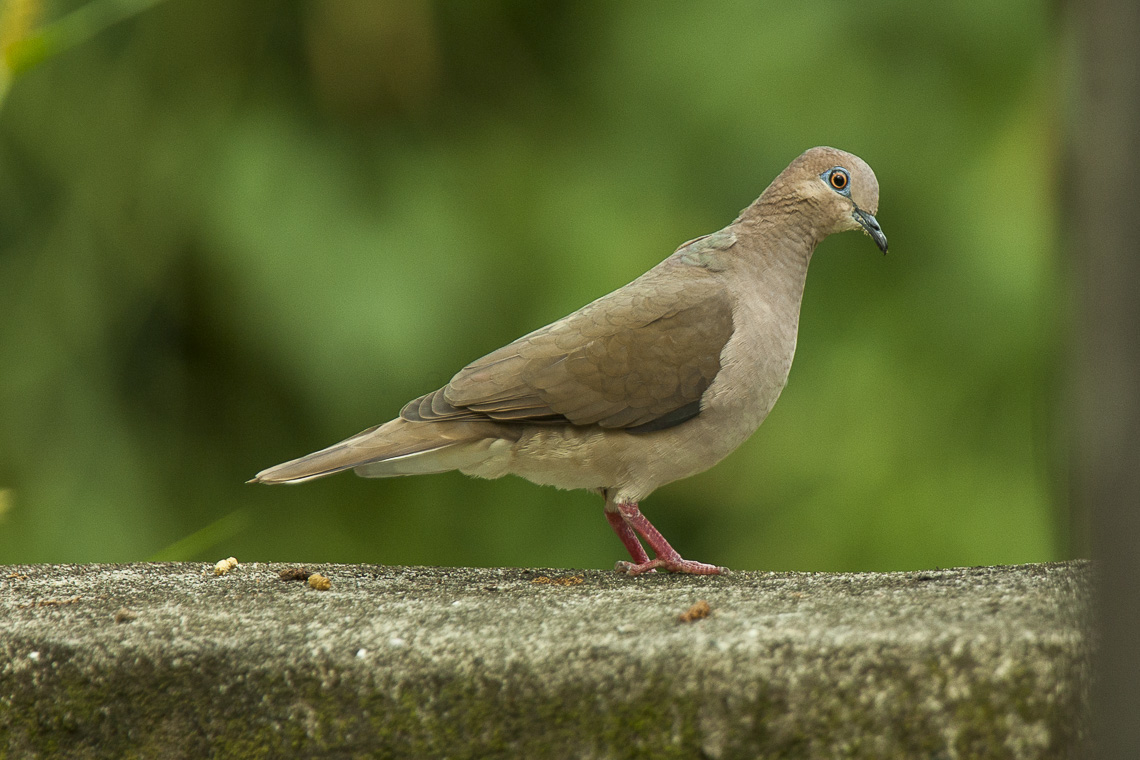

Conservation status
- Least Concern (IUCN 3.1)

Scientific classification
- Kingdom: Animalia
- Phylum: Chordata
- Class: Aves
- Order: Columbiformes
- Family: Columbidae
- Genus: Leptotila
- Species: L. verreauxi

Binomial name
- Leptotila verreauxi Bonaparte, 1855

= White-tipped dove =

White-tipped Dove

Species of bird

The white-tipped dove (Leptotila verreauxi) is a large New World tropical dove. Its scientific name commemorates the French naturalists Jules and Edouard Verreaux.

== Distribution and habitat ==
The dove is a resident breeder from southernmost Texas in the United States through Mexico and Central America south to western Peru and central Argentina. It also breeds on the offshore islands of northern South America, including Trinidad and Tobago and the Netherlands Antilles. It inhabits scrub, woodland and forest.

=== Subspecies ===
The following subspecies are recognized:

- L. v. capitalis – Nelson, 1898: Tres Marías Islands
- L. v. angelica – Bangs & Penard, TE, 1922: found from Texas and coastal Mexico
- L. v. fulviventris – Lawrence, 1882: southeast Mexico to Guatemala and Belize
- L. v. bangsi – Dickey & Van Rossem, 1926: west Guatemala to western Nicaragua and Honduras
- L. v. nuttingi – Ridgway, 1915: Lake Nicaragua
- L. v. verreauxi – Bonaparte, 1855: the nominate taxon, found from Nicaragua to Venezuela
- L. v. tobagensis – Hellmayr & Seilern, 1915: Tobago
- L. v. hernandezi – Romero-Zambrano & Morales-Sánchez, 1981: southwest Colombia
- L. v. decolor – Salvin, 1895: found west of the Andes from Colombia to northern Peru
- L. v. brasiliensis – (Bonaparte, 1856): found in most of the Amazon north of the Amazon River
- L. v. approximans – Cory, 1917: northeast Brazil
- L. v. decipiens – (Salvadori, 1871): found in much of central South America
- L. v. chlorauchenia – Sclater, PL & Salvin, 1870: southern Bolivia and southeast Brazil south to northern Argentina

The subspecies chlorauchenia was formerly known as chalcauchenia, but the former name was found to have precedence in 2023.

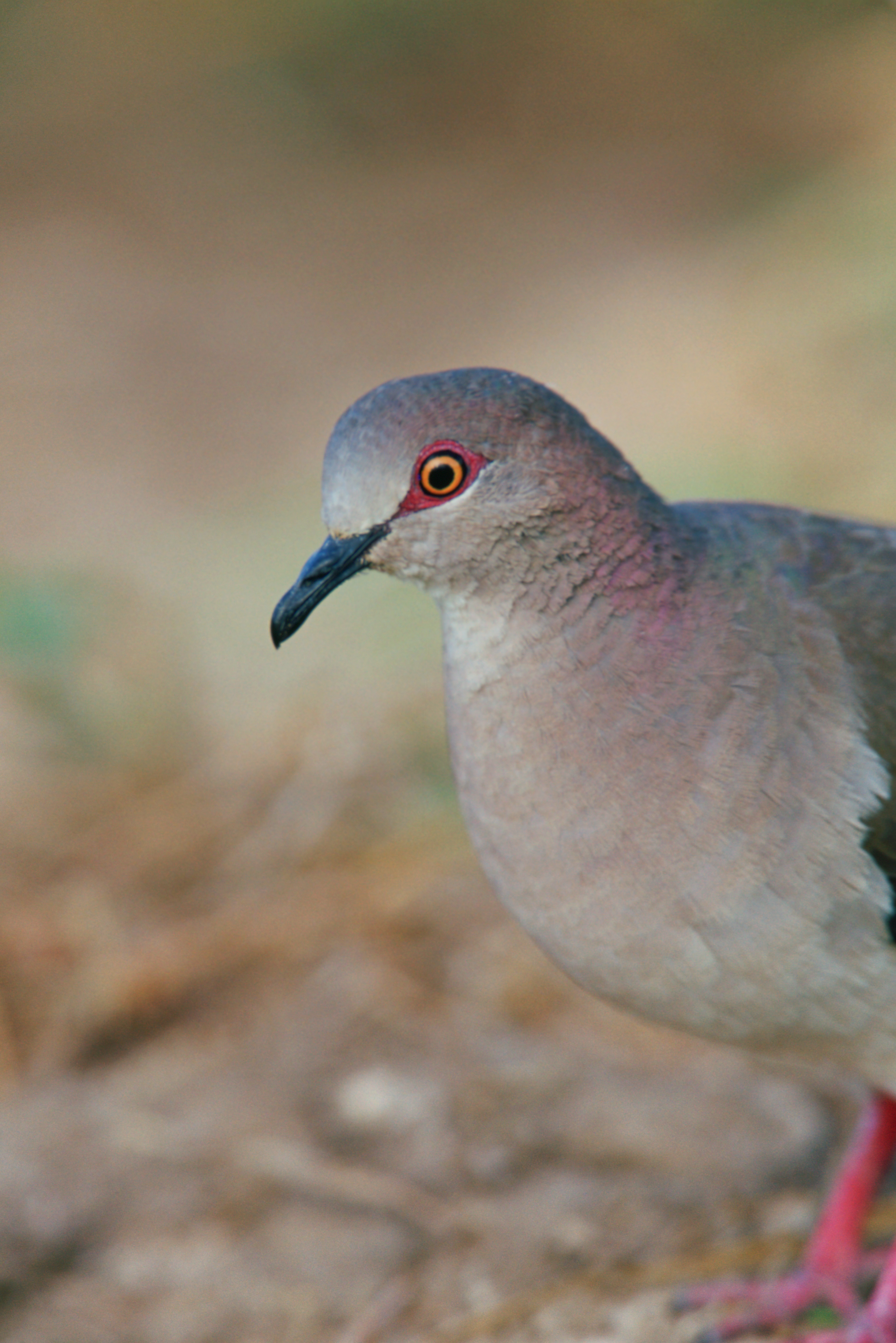
with red eye ring, USA (unknown location)

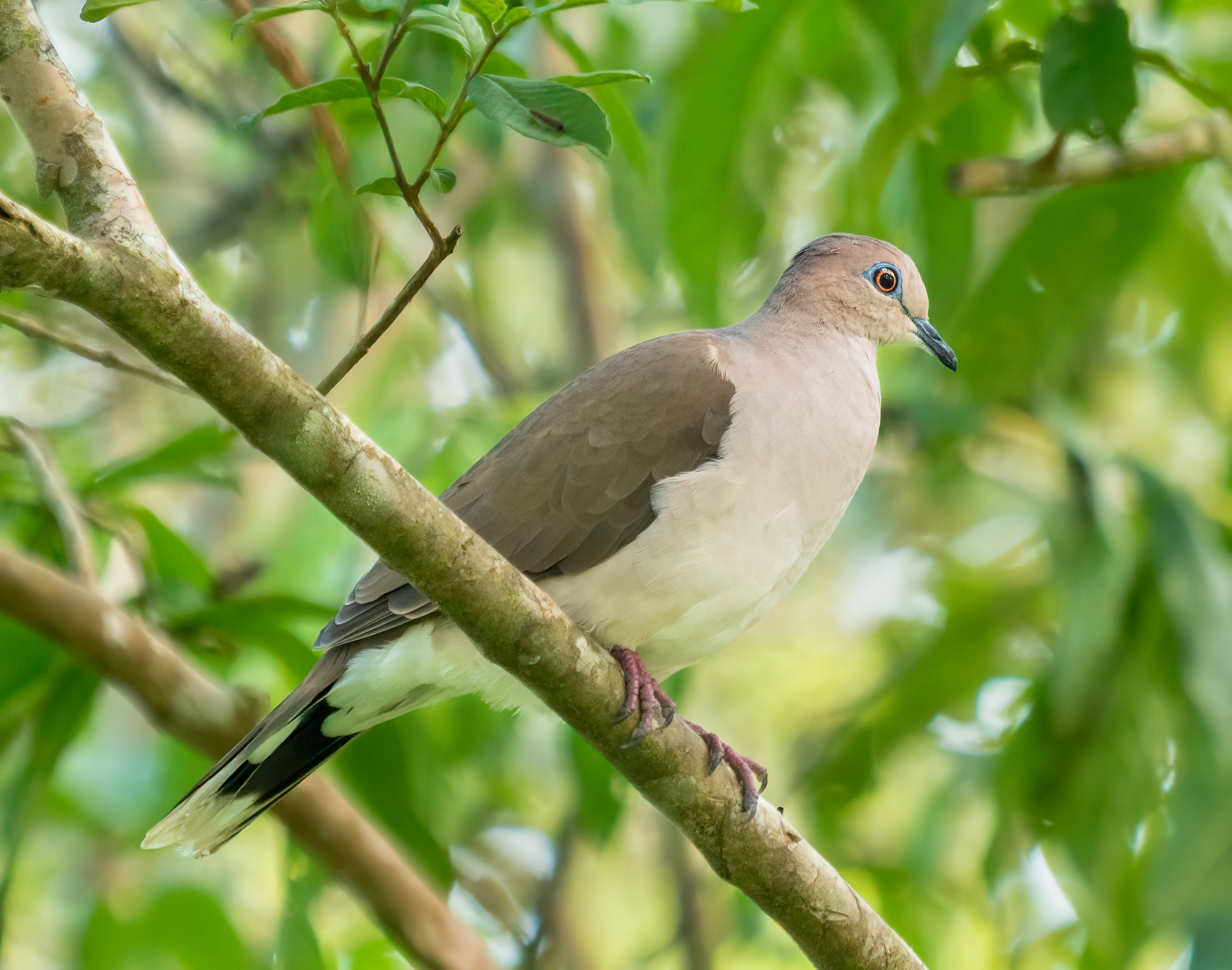
L. v. verreauxi with blue eye ring, Costa Rica

L. v. decipiens, the Pantanal, Brazil

== Description ==
The dove is about 28 cm (11 in) long and weighs 155 g (5.5 oz). Adult birds of most races have a grey tinge from the crown to the nape, a pale grey or whitish forehead and a whitish throat. The eye-ring is typically red in most of its range, but blue in most of the Amazon and northern South America. The upperparts and wings are grey-brown, and the underparts are whitish shading to pinkish, dull grey or buff on the chest. The underwing coverts are rufous. The tail is broadly tipped with white, but this is best visible from below or in flight. The bill is black, the legs are red and the iris is yellow.

The white-tipped dove resembles the closely related grey-fronted dove (Leptotila rufaxilla), which prefers humid forest habitats. The best distinctions are the greyer forehead and crown, which contrast less with the hindcrown than in the grey-fronted dove. In the area of overlap, the white-tipped dove usually has a blue (not red) eye-ring, but this is not reliable in some parts of Brazil, Argentina, Bolivia, Paraguay and Uruguay, where it typically is red in both species.

== Behaviour ==
The white-tipped dove is usually seen alone or in pairs, and is rather wary. They remain in their territory and do not migrate. Its flight is fast and direct, with the regular beats and clattering of the wings, characteristic of pigeons in general. They live in a variety of woodland habitats. The call is a deep hollow ooo-wooooo.

=== Breeding ===
It builds a large stick nest in a tree near ground level and lays two white eggs. Incubation is about 14 days, and fledging another 15.

=== Feeding ===
The food is mainly seeds obtained by foraging on the ground, but it will also take insects, including butterflies and moths.

=== Vocal ===
They utilize their voice to perform a variety of tasks: defend territory, attract potential mates, indicate food resources, alert predators, and maintain group contact.

Two notes at the same pitch is their signature call: an introductory hoot followed by a longer, more audible, hollow note.
