= Cébaco =

Island of Panama

Coordinates: 7°34′30″N 81°4′27″W

Cébaco island lies off the Pacific Coast of the Republic of Panama, in Montijo District, Veraguas Province. It is located near another island called Gobernadora, which is smaller. It has much wildlife within its forest and some large private properties that have teak plantations.

== Economy and infrastructure ==
The island is located in the Gulf of Montijo and has a small town of approximately 30 homes on the northern coast of the island. Most locals live off commercial fishing and sell to the mainland. The only transportation to the island is by boat, but no commercial ferry operations are available. Local fisherman can be found on the mainland that are able to transport groups to various parts of the island. The town in Cébaco Island uses solar panels as an energy source that provides electricity to the community, and powers a local public phone and the public phone antenna.

=== Tourism ===
The Gulf of Montijo is well known for its sport fishing (tuna and wahoo), Scuba diving and whale watching. Besides the fishing, Cebaco offers surfing on the southern coast. In the main village of El Jobo, there are accommodations, Coiba Lost World EcoLodge, and offer activities around the area of Cebaco, Montijo Bay and Gobernadora .

== Environment ==
Much of the western half of the island has been designated an Important Bird Area (IBA) by BirdLife International because it supports a significant population of brown-backed doves. The Derby's woolly opossum also occurs there.
