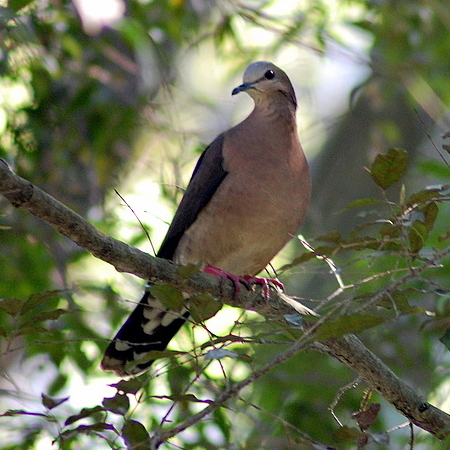

Conservation status
- Least Concern (IUCN 3.1)

Scientific classification
- Kingdom: Animalia
- Phylum: Chordata
- Class: Aves
- Order: Columbiformes
- Family: Columbidae
- Genus: Leptotila
- Species: L. rufaxilla

Binomial name
- Leptotila rufaxilla (Richard & Bernard, 1792)

= Grey-fronted dove =

Species of bird

The grey-fronted dove (Leptotila rufaxilla) is a large New World tropical dove. It is found on Trinidad and in every mainland South American country except Chile.

== Taxonomy and systematics ==
The grey-fronted dove, the grey-headed dove (Leptotila plumbeiceps) and azuero dove (L. battyi) of Central America, the pallid dove (L. pallida) of South America, and the Grenada dove (L. wellsi) of Grenada were at one time thought to be a single species. Even after these were split into individual species, some authors treated pallid dove as a subspecies of grey-fronted dove. Grey-fronted dove, grey-headed dove, and pallid dove are possibly a superspecies.

The grey-fronted dove has these six subspecies. The population in Suriname, here included in the nominate L. r. rufaxilla, has been proposed as a seventh subspecies, L. r. hypochroos.

- L. r. pallidipectus Chapman (1915)
- L. r. dubusi Bonaparte (1855)
- L. r. rufaxilla Richard & Bernard (1792)
- L. r. helmayri Chapman (1915)
- L. r. bahiae Berlepsch (1885)
- L. r. reichenbachii Pelzeln (1870)

== Description ==
The grey-fronted dove is about 28 cm (11 in) long and weighs 115 to 183 g (4.1 to 6.5 oz). Adult males of the nominate subspecies have a grayish to bluish forehead ("front"), a bluish gray crown, and a grayish purple nape and hindneck with some iridescence. The yellow or brown eye is surrounded by bare red skin that is itself surrounded by pinkish white feathers. The throat is also pinkish white and the rest of the face buff to pinkish buff. The upperparts are olive-brown with faint bronze or purplish on the mantle. The central tail feathers are also olive-brown and the outer ones blackish with obvious white tips. The breast and sides of the neck are greyish pink shading to white on the belly. The bill is black and the legs and feet red. The adult nominate female is browner than the male, with more of an olive cast to the flanks and green-tinged upperparts. The juvenile is similar to the female but its breast has rust and drab brown bars and the upperparts' feathers show rusty edges. The other subspecies differ somewhat in size and their colors are redder, pinker, or grayer than the nominate.

== Distribution and habitat ==
The grey-fronted dove is a resident breeder in South America on Trinidad and east of the Andes from Colombia, Venezuela and the Guyanas south to Paraguay, Uruguay, and northeastern Argentina. The subspecies are found thus:

- L. r. pallidipectus, eastern Colombia and probably western Venezuela
- L. r. dubusi, southeastern Colombia to south-central Venezuela, south through eastern Ecuador to eastern Peru, and east into western Brazil
- L. r. rufaxilla, eastern Venezuela, the Guianas, and northern Brazil
- L. r. helmayri, Venezuela's Paria Peninsula and Trinidad
- L. r. bahiae, central Brazil
- L. r. reichenbachii, central and southern Brazil south to northeastern Argentina, Paraguay, and Uruguay

The grey-fronted dove inhabits humid forest, generally in the interior but also at the edges and in clearings. In Colombia it has been recorded in várzea, terra firme, and gallery forests. In elevation it is found below 550 m (1,800 ft) in Venezuela and locally as high as 2,200 m (7,220 ft) in southeastern Brazil.

== Behavior ==
=== Feeding ===
The grey-fronted dove forages on the forest floor, eating seeds, small fruit such as berries, insects such as small butterflies and moths, and other invertebrates. It has also been recorded eating bananas and rice at feeding stations.

=== Breeding ===
The grey-fronted dove breeds almost year round in Trinidad; elsewhere its breeding season is shorter. It builds a platform nest of twigs in a bush, tree, or palm and lays one or two white eggs.

=== Vocalization ===
The grey-fronted dove's song is "a single mournful monotonous note 'wooOOOoo' which fades in and out."

== Status ==
The IUCN has assessed the grey-fronted dove as being of Least Concern. Its population is estimated to exceed 500,000 but is believed to be decreasing.
