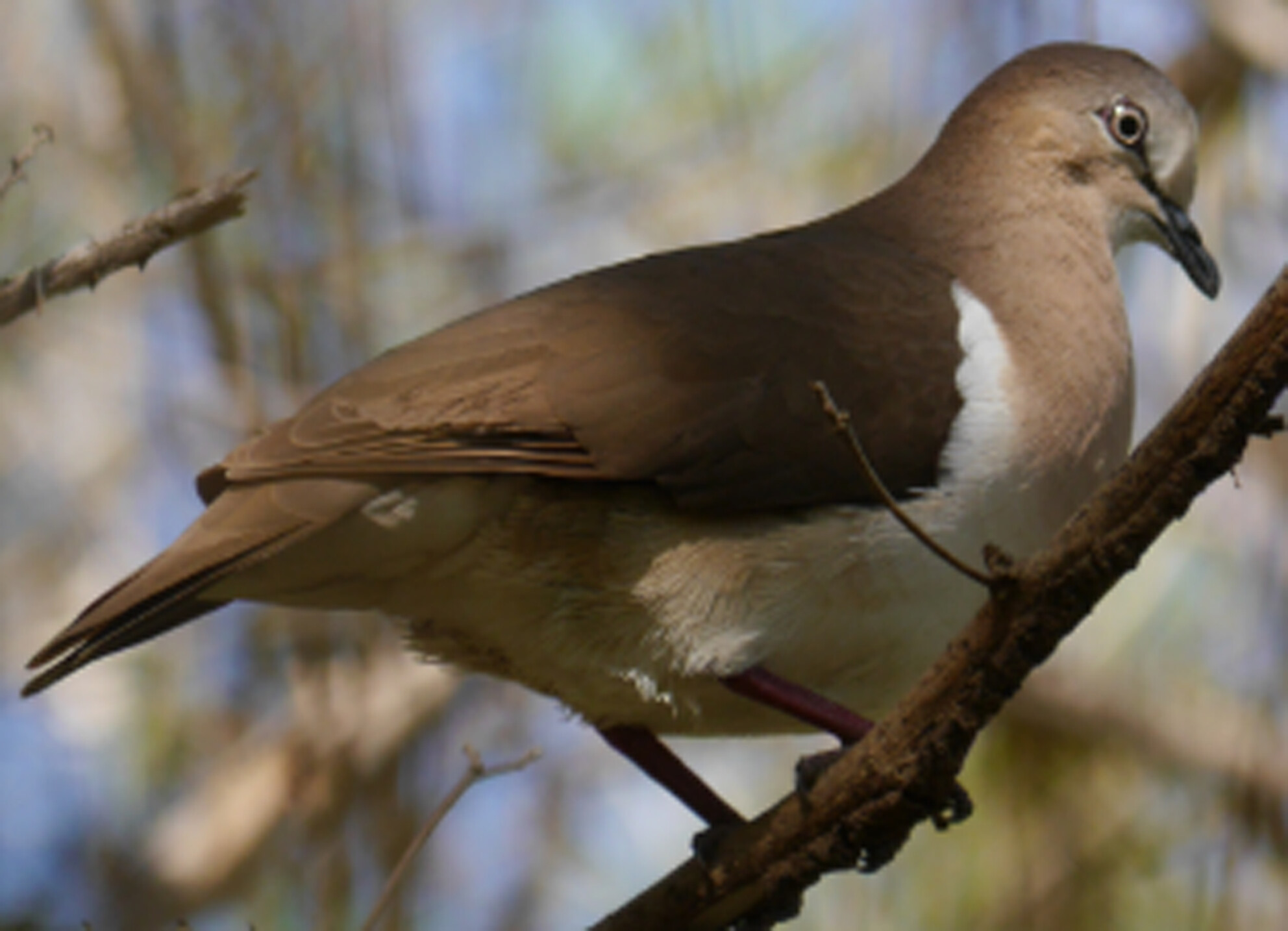

Conservation status
- Critically Endangered (IUCN 3.1)

Scientific classification
- Kingdom: Animalia
- Phylum: Chordata
- Class: Aves
- Order: Columbiformes
- Family: Columbidae
- Genus: Leptotila
- Species: L. wellsi

Binomial name
- Leptotila wellsi (Lawrence, 1884)

= Grenada dove =

Species of bird

The Grenada dove (Leptotila wellsi) is a medium-sized New World tropical dove. It is endemic to the island of Grenada in the Lesser Antilles. Originally known as the pea dove or Well's dove, it is the national bird of Grenada. It is considered to be one of the most critically endangered doves in the world.

== Description ==
The Grenada dove is characterised by a white throat; face and forehead pale pink shading to dull brown on crown and nape; upperparts olive brown; underwing chestnut; neck and upper breast pink-buff fading to white on lower breast, belly and undertail coverts.

== Origin ==
First described in 1884 by Lawrence as a member of the genus Engyptila, it was established as a distinct species using sonographic analysis by Blockstein and Hardy (1988). Now officially known as the Grenada dove, it was designated as the national bird in 1991 and is one of the flagship species for conservation efforts in Grenada.

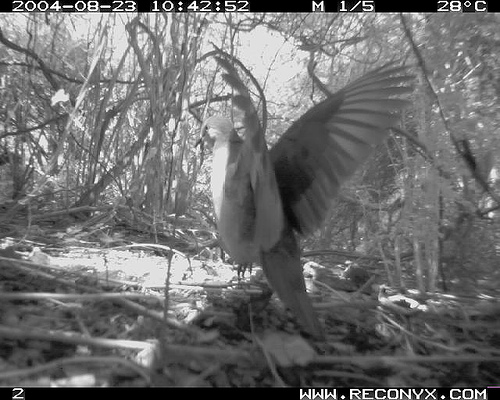
Grenada dove. Concord River Watershed. Black Bay Delta, Grenada W.I. 2004

== Distribution and habitat ==
The Grenada dove is a little-known species endemic to the main island of Grenada, West Indies. Historically, it has been recorded from locations throughout Grenada, including offshore islands, and the type specimen was collected from Fontenoy, on the west coast.

Some surveys imply that Grenada doves are associated with dry forest communities in the west and southwest parts of the main island (Blockstein 1988, Blockstein and Hardy 1989, Bird Life International 2000). True dry forest ecosystems are remnants of a type of xeric scrub habitat that dominated the West Indies at the end of the Pleistocene, and most areas classified as dry forest in the Caribbean are mosaics of degraded habitat, and do not represent natural ecosystems (Murphy and Lugo 1986, Vidal and Casado 2000). Beard noted the degraded nature of forested areas in Grenada in 1949.

Results from the Grenada Dry Forest Biodiversity Conservation Project indicate that Grenada doves are found most often in areas composed primarily of degraded mosaics of evergreen forest. The overall uniting factors in Grenada dove habitat issues are the degraded nature of the habitat and close proximity to human habitation. This is readily apparent at the Mount Hartman sanctuary, which is an old government cattle farm with vegetation composed primarily of exotic species such as Leucaena leucocephala and Heamatoxylon. Populations of doves associated with the old golf course below Jean Anglais, in the Richmond Hill Watershed, are under heavy pressure from development for private homes, and are well outside the boundaries of the Mount Hartman Sanctuary as are most Grenada doves. Mount Hartman could be considered prime cattle habitat and has been developed as such until recent times.

Rivera Lugo has suggested that past disturbance may have created new artificial vegetative cover types that are difficult to classify as natural forest communities. Recent classification of land cover types through satellite imagery found that Grenada's dry forest might be more appropriately considered as ecological complexes, and that there may be correlations between human influence and vegetative cover. The Rivera Lugo investigations suggest that Grenada doves are using a mixture of three seasonal forest formations: semi-evergreen forest, deciduous seasonal forest, and thorn woodlands. These categories are based on work by Beard and are applied widely throughout the Caribbean.

Beard considered the thorn woodland seasonal formation to be a highly degraded habitat created by heavy grazing and intensive agricultural practices. Additionally, preliminary surveys and recent census data indicate Grenada doves occur in both highly fragmented semi-urban areas and more rural environments composed sometimes of highly contrasting levels of housing and economic development. Other members of the genus Leptotila are reported to use a variety of habitats, ranging from areas associated with human disturbance, deciduous woodlands, humid forests, thickets, and semi-arid areas (Goodwin 1993).

Grenada doves have been documented in south-western Grenada within the Mount Hartman, Clark's Court Bay, and Richmond Hill watersheds (Blockstein 1988, Blockstein and Hardy 1989). The Mount Hartman watershed has received the greatest amount of scientific investigation and is considered by other researchers to be the representative habitat for the species (Blockstein 1988, Blockstein and Hardy 1989). Part of this watershed has been designated as a national park and is the only official national park in Grenada. Grenada doves also have been recorded from western Grenada (Blockstein 1988, Blockstein and Hardy 1989).

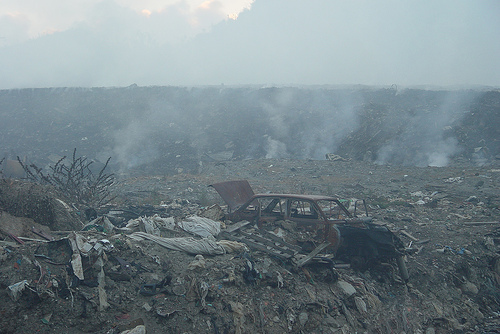
Perseverance Landfill Fire Grenada, W.I. 2005

The most recent distribution census included individuals from the Beausejour, Perseverance, Woodford, and Black Bay watersheds. Part of the Perseverance watershed, adjacent to the island's new sanitary landfill and across the street from the old landfill, has been established as a Grenada dove sanctuary. This area includes a designated travel corridor to link areas of habitat on the north and south sides of the new landfill. The old landfill is currently on fire and has been burning since February 2004. An emergency landfill, which has been established to accommodate the large volume of debris created by Hurricane Ivan in early September 2004, is encroaching on the Perseverance sanctuary.

== Behaviour ==
=== Breeding ===
Grenada doves are assumed to be territorial, and current population estimates are based on this assumption. Grenada doves in the Mount Hartman area have been observed fighting (Blockstein 1988), and other Leptotila species show varying degrees of territorial behaviour (Goodwin 1983). Herbert Bright maintained captive Leptotila doves in England and documented a breeding pair killing other congeneric doves introduced to the aviary. Bright refers to these birds as Well's doves, although his physical descriptions of the birds indicate that they may have been L. verreauxi imported from Tobago.

Only one active Grenada dove nest has been documented. This nest was active during January and February and was found in a palm. Juveniles also have been found on the ground and photographed by Grenada's Forestry and National Parks Department (FNDP) staff; no nest was documented for this encounter. Additionally, there is a record of a dove flushing from a nest. Bright noted that Leptotila doves in captivity abandoned their nest when disturbed, but by using artificial nesting substrates, he successfully collected eggs and hand-reared young. Bright's doves produced two buff-coloured eggs per clutch. This is consistent with literature reports from other members of the genus (Goodwin 1983).

The majority of information on the nesting ecology for the genus is associated with Leptotila verreauxi. Studies indicate that L. verreauxi primarily nests on edges and interiors of brushlands and forest dominated by Pithecellobium ebano and Celtis laevigata (Boydston and DeYoung 1987, Hayslette et al. 2000), and nests are located in a wide variety of nesting substrates (Hayslette 1996, Hogan 1999).

=== Diet ===
Grenada dove were documented consuming Carica papaya (Papaya) during diet studies associated with Grenada Dry Forest Ecosystem Protection Project. Observations have been made of Grenada doves foraging on the ground (Blockstein 1998). Leptotila in captivity have been documented consuming mealworms. Other Leptotila species have been observed eating fruits, seeds, and agricultural grain. L. verrauxi is known to visit bird feeders (Goodwin 1983), and other members of the genus have been observed eating fruit from the forest floor (Estrada et al. 1984, Coates-Estrada and Estrada 1986), as well as directly from plants (Goodwin 1983).

== Conservation ==
Very little is known about this species. Population estimates by various researchers indicate that there may be fewer than 100 individuals remaining in the wild (Blockstein 1988), and declines in numbers may have occurred between 1987 and 1991. The last published population estimates were produced by David Blockstein in 1991. Results of point count surveys conducted during research associated with the Grenada Dry Forest Ecosystem Protection Project indicate very low numbers of the dove immediately following Hurricane Ivan. Only five birds were documented calling simultaneously in the Mt. Hartman Watershed during April–June 2005 and only three birds were calling during August–December 2005 in the same areas. During the August–December time period five birds were documented in the Clarks Court Bay watershed and four were documented in the Beausejeur watershed using point count methods.

This dove is classified as critically endangered by BirdLife International on the IUCN Red List.

The Grenada Government – in cooperation with the World Bank – set up two reserve zones in 1996 to preserve the dove: the Perseverance and adjacent Woodford Estates, which are adjacent to a landfill and abandoned quarry site, in the west of the island and a sanctuary of c.150 acres (0.61 km^{2}) within the Mount Hartman Estate, a former government cattle farm and sugarcane plantation, in the south. Camera surveys of the Mount Hartman area failed to record the presence of Grenada doves there immediately following Hurricane Ivan in 2005 and only eighteen encounters with Grenada doves occurred during April–December 2005. According to some studies, the Mount Hartman Sanctuary was never considered adequate for the dove's survival and other understudied populations are located along the western coast in the Beausejour and Black Bay watersheds. Some of these populations have been recognised since the 1980s. Further populations may exist but there has never been a complete island-wide survey to verify this.

=== Threats ===
The primary threat to the Grenada dove is considered to be habitat fragmentation. As early as 1947, Bond indicated that one of the primary causes of rarity and extinction for avifauna in the West Indies was habitat destruction by human activities. Jackson and Associates noted many factors that could affect Grenada dove populations, including land development, livestock grazing, and harvesting of firewood, the underlying cause being lack of land development regulation. Active charcoal pits were discovered adjacent to the Grenada dove visitor centre and charcoal damage was noted in all areas of known Grenada dove habitat during 2005 surveys.

In addition to habitat destruction, predation may affect Grenada dove populations. There may have been two separate introductions of exotic species on Grenada. Of these, the common opossum, Didelphis marsupialis, which was originally introduced to Grenada by Amerindians, is a potential predator of all life stages of the Grenada dove, and other manicou species (Marmosa spp.) are potential nest predators. Exotic mammals introduced with European colonisation include Rattus species, Indian mongooses (Hepestes aropunctatus), Mona monkeys (Cercopithicus mona) and feral cats (Felis silvestris).

Rats were the most abundant predator documented during the Grenada Dry Forest Biodiversity Conservation Project. This same project only documented one feral cat in the Mt. Hartman Watershed.

Hunting may have affected the population in the past, and the Grenada dove has previously been regulated as a game bird. Currently, hunting is not considered a major threat.

New studies have shown a decrease in genetic diversity within Grenada dove populations in the Perseverance and Mt. Harman estates, exacerbated by habitat loss and fragmentation, thus making the species less resilient to other threats.

=== Mount Hartman Estate ===
In late 2006, information was released stating that the Government intended to sell a portion of Mount Hartman Estate to a private promoter for development as a tourist resort under the probable management of Four Seasons Hotels. The Grenada Government issued a statement stating that any new project within the Mount Hartman Estate would have to respect the dove sanctuaries and that any project would have to meet the criteria of providing a "win-win" situation. BirdLife International and other organisations questioned whether a "win-win" situation could be achieved. BirdLife International, with other organisations (including the American Bird Conservancy) and private individuals (including authors Graeme Gibson and Margaret Atwood) campaigned against the proposed development.

The original development plan for the resort included 255 villas, a hotel, and an 18-hole golf course. Due to pressure from opponents of the development, the plan for the resort was reduced from 255 villas to 173, although the hotel and golf course were retained.

=== Grenada Dry Forest Biodiversity Protection Project ===
There is very little information for this species that has been peer-reviewed and very little research has taken place on the species. The most thorough scientific investigation to date is associated with the Grenada Dry Forest Biodiversity Protection Project. Unfortunately most of the documents associated with this project are unavailable to the public and are not currently available through the GEF Website.
