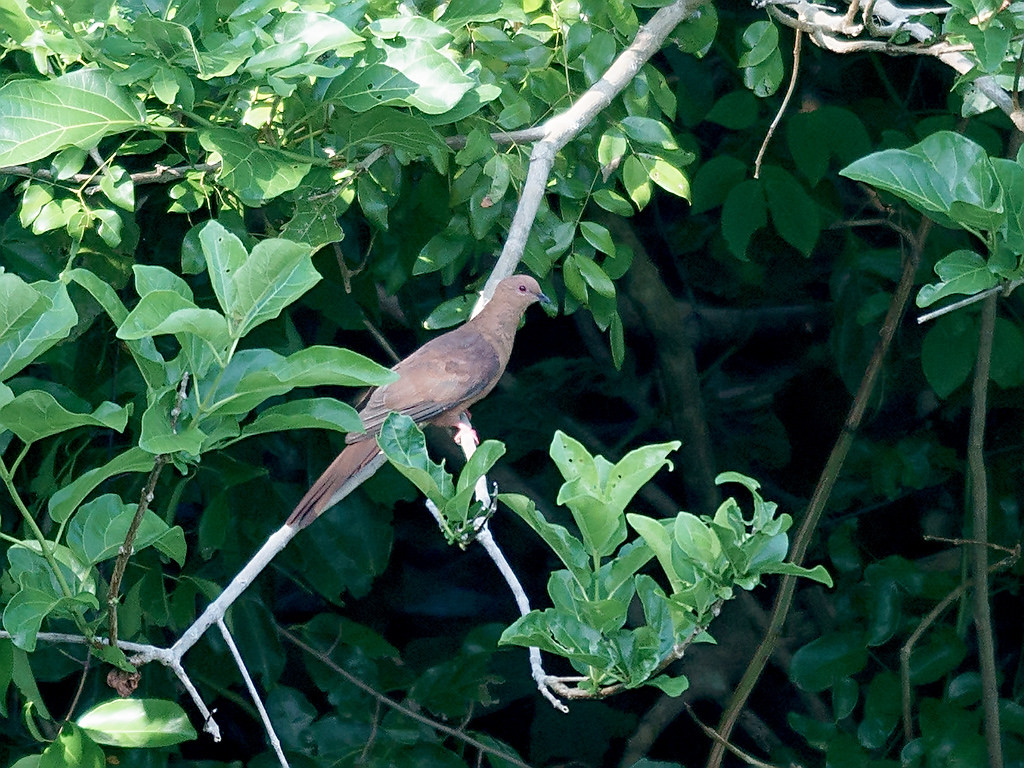

Conservation status
- Least Concern (IUCN 3.1)

Scientific classification
- Kingdom: Animalia
- Phylum: Chordata
- Class: Aves
- Order: Columbiformes
- Family: Columbidae
- Genus: Macropygia
- Species: M. mackinlayi

Binomial name
- Macropygia mackinlayi Ramsay, 1878

= Spot-breasted cuckoo-dove =

Species of bird

The spot-breasted cuckoo-dove (Macropygia mackinlayi), also known as Mackinlay's cuckoo-dove, is a species of bird in the family Columbidae. It is found in Papua New Guinea, Solomon Islands, and Vanuatu. It is rated as a species of least concern on the International Union for Conservation of Nature Red List of Endangered Species.

== Taxonomy ==
The specific epithet is named after the Scottish naturalist Archibald Mackinlay.

== Description ==
The spot-breasted cuckoo-dove is a small greyish brown or reddish brown cuckoo-dove; these two distinct color morphs are unique among pigeons. It measures 27 to 31 cm (11 to 12 in) in length, and weighs about 87 grams (3.1 oz). It has a relatively short beak. The breast feathers have black bases and are bifurcated, the lack of the feather tip exposing adjoining feather bases and giving the breast a spotted appearance. The juvenile is barred, and similar to the female spot-breasted cuckoo-dove or the juvenile Amboyna cuckoo-dove (Macropygia amboinensis).

The spot-breasted cuckoo-dove is similar in appearance to the slender-billed cuckoo-dove which is relatively larger, has a longer beak, and its upperparts are darker brown than the buffier underparts. In females of that species, the breast is barred with black above and across, and the breast feathers do not bifurcate.

It is also similar to the bar-tailed cuckoo-dove (Macropygia nigrirostris) which is slightly larger than it is and has richer reddish brown plumage but not the paler head and underparts of the Mackinlay's cuckoo-dove. The underparts of the female bar-tailed cuckoo-dove are rufous-buff but the feathers are not bifurcated and the breast lacks the black speckling of the spot-breasted cuckoo-dove.

== Status and conservation ==
Since 1998, the spot-breasted cuckoo-dove has been rated as a species of least concern on the IUCN Red List of Endangered Species. This is because it has a very large range—more than 20,000 km^{2} (7,700 mi^{2})—and because it has a stable population trend. Also, although its population numbers have not been determined, they are thought to be above 10,000, which is above the criterion to warrant a vulnerable rating. It is thought to be commonly found on most islands of its range, but it is rarely found on New Britain and on Aneityum. There are no major threats thought to be to this species.
