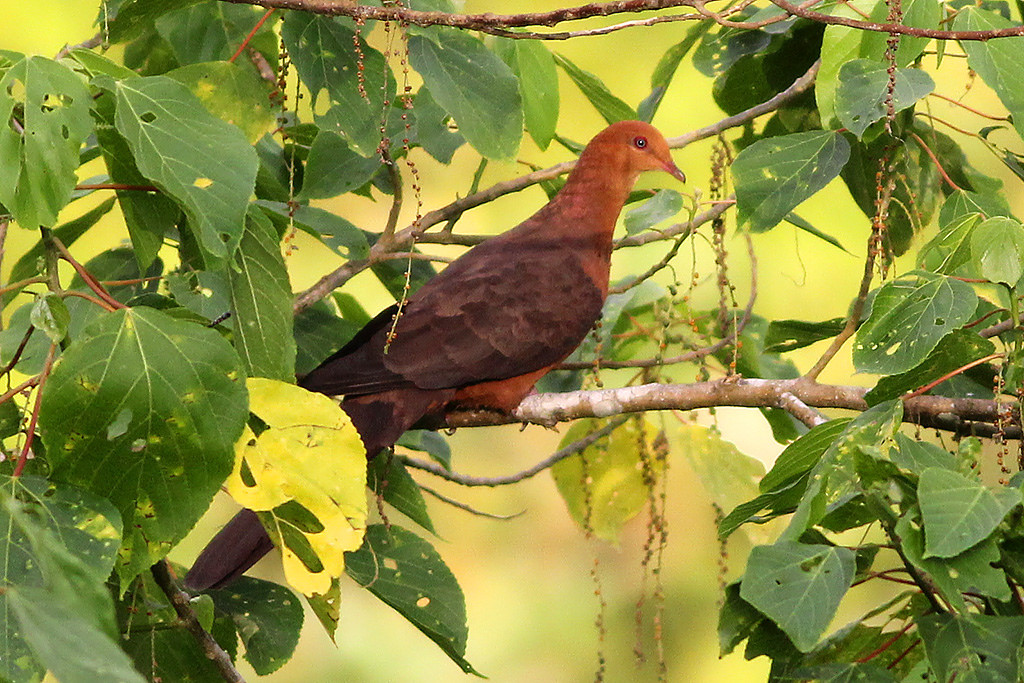

Conservation status
- Least Concern (IUCN 3.1)

Scientific classification
- Kingdom: Animalia
- Phylum: Chordata
- Class: Aves
- Order: Columbiformes
- Family: Columbidae
- Genus: Macropygia
- Species: M. tenuirostris

Binomial name
- Macropygia tenuirostris Bonaparte, 1854

Subspecies
- See text

= Philippine cuckoo-dove =

Species of bird

The Philippine cuckoo-dove (Macropygia tenuirostris) is a species of bird in the family Columbidae. It is found in the Philippines and Taiwan and is rated as a species of least concern on the International Union for Conservation of Nature Red List of Endangered Species.

== Taxonomy and systematics ==
The Philippine cuckoo-dove was first described by the French zoologist Charles Lucien Jules Laurent Bonaparte in 1854. Formerly, some authorities classified it as a subspecies of either the ruddy cuckoo-dove or the brown cuckoo-dove. It was split from the slender-billed cuckoo-dove in 2016 and has four sub-species recognized:

- M. t. phaea McGregor, 1904 - Lanyu Island, Batan Island, and Calayan Island
- M. t. tenuirostris Bonaparte, 1854 - Philippines
- M. t. borneensis Robinson & Kloss, 1921 - Borneo. Provisionally moved from ruddy cuckoo-dove to Macropygia tenuirostris by the IOU.
- M. t. septentrionalis Hachisuka, 1930 - Batan, Itbayat and Sabtan Islands (northern Philippines); Lanyu Island (Taiwan).

== Description ==
The Philippine cuckoo-dove is a large cuckoo-dove that measures 38.5 centimetres (15.2 in) in length, and weighs 157 to 191 g (5.5 to 6.7 oz). The head is cinnamon reddish brown in colour, and the uppermantle has an amethyst shine with small brown freckles. The hindneck has an amethyst shine too. The adult has an orange-reddish brown forehead, with a chestnut coloured crown and nape that have pinkish tinge. The irides are red, and the beak is brown. The ear coverts and neck-sides are also orange-reddish brown. The hindneck and breast-sides are shiny pinkish purple, and have black spots. The breast is lightly tinged with lilac. The outer tail coverts are dark reddish brown, with black subterminal bands. The feet are bright red in colour. The adult female has warm buff hindneck which is spotted and barred with black. The mantle and the wing coverts are more reddish brown at peripheries. The juvenile resembles the female in appearance, but is more barred.

== Status and conservation ==
Since 1998, the Philippine cuckoo-dove has been rated as a species of least concern on the IUCN Red List of Endangered Species. This is because it has a large range—more than 20,000 km^{2} (7,700 mi^{2})—and because it has a stable population trend. Also, although its population numbers have not been determined, they are thought to be above 10,000, which is above the criterion to warrant a vulnerable rating. It is reportedly a widespread species. It is thought to have no major threats.
