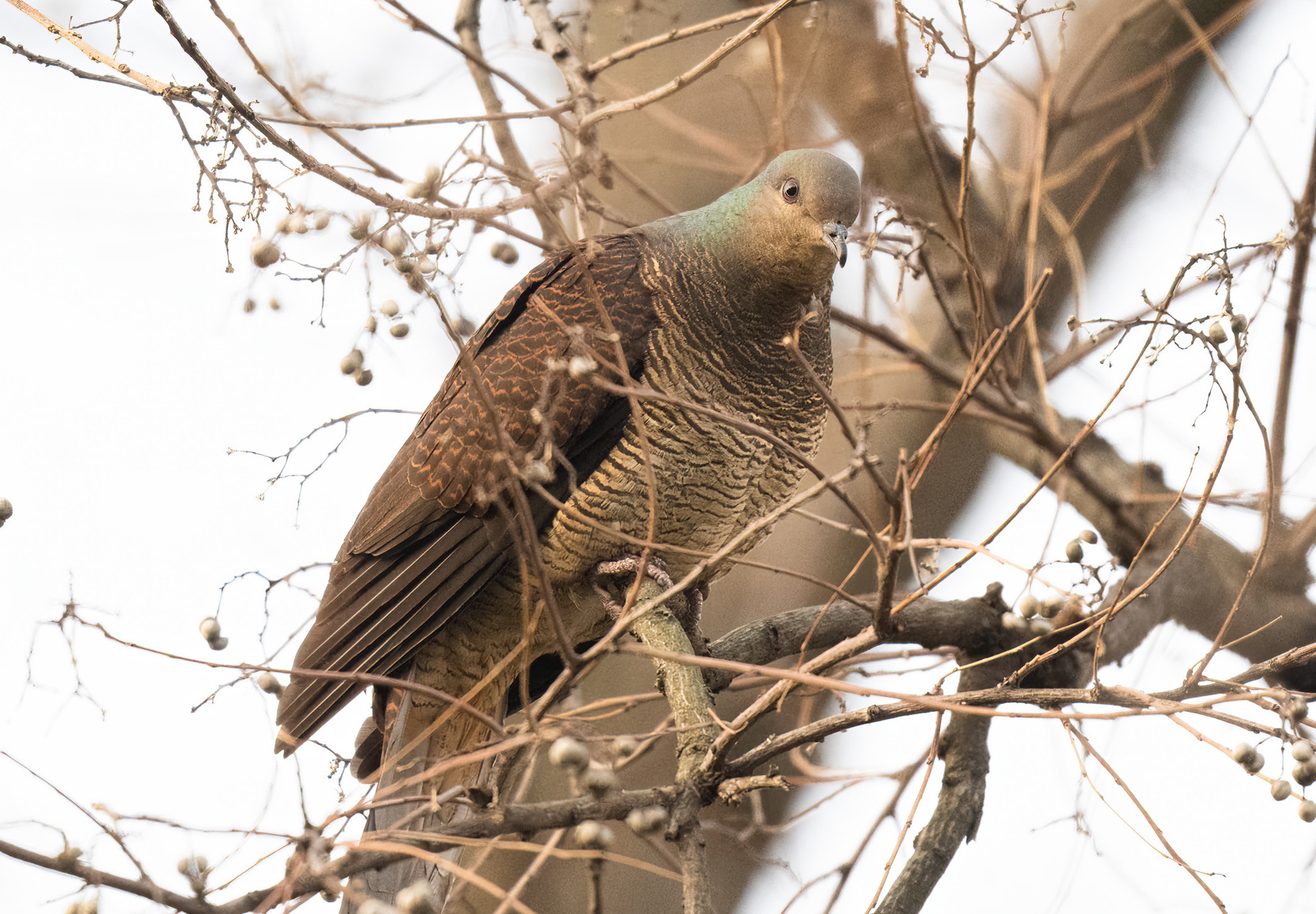

Conservation status
- Least Concern (IUCN 3.1)

Scientific classification
- Kingdom: Animalia
- Phylum: Chordata
- Class: Aves
- Order: Columbiformes
- Family: Columbidae
- Genus: Macropygia
- Species: M. unchall

Binomial name
- Macropygia unchall (Wagler, 1827)

= Barred cuckoo-dove =

Species of bird

The barred cuckoo-dove (Macropygia unchall) is a bird species in the family Columbidae. It is native to South and Southeast Asia, and listed as Least Concern on the IUCN Red List.

== Taxonomy ==
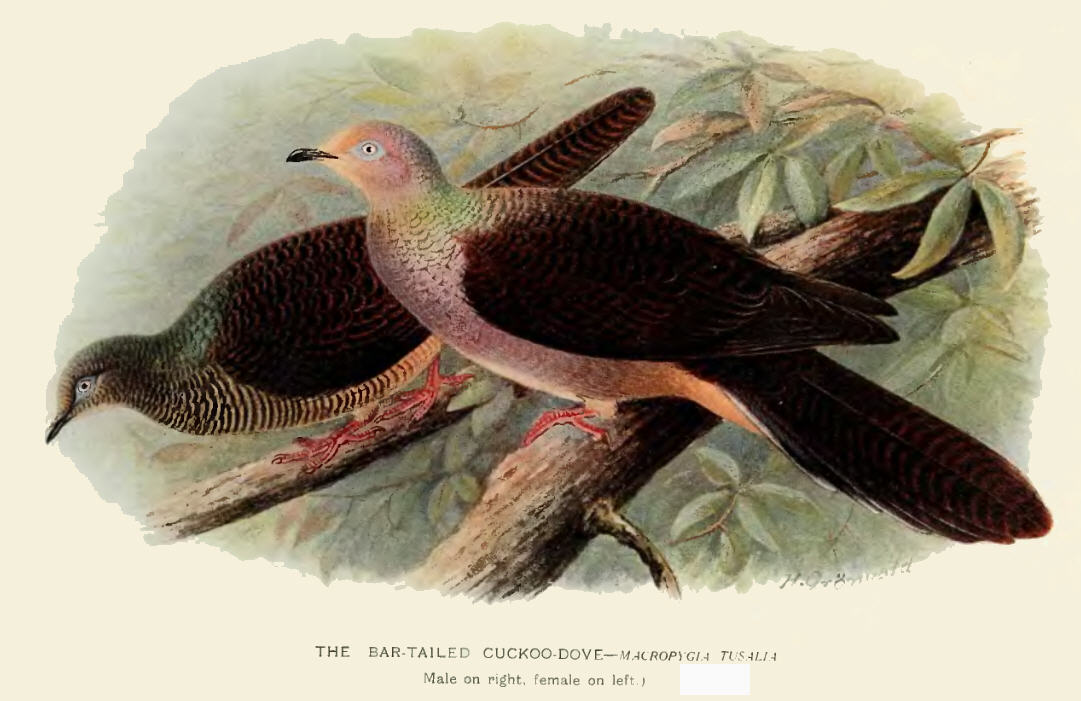
Illustration of male and female

German herpetologist Johann Georg Wagler first described the barred cuckoo-dove in 1827. It has three recognized subspecies:

- M. u. tusalia (Blyth, 1843)
- M. u. minor (Swinhoe, 1870)
- M. u. unchall (Wagler, 1827)

== Description ==
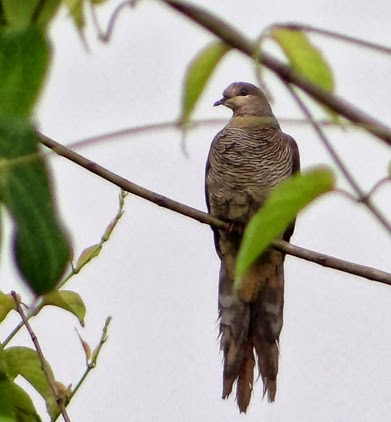
Barred cuckoo-dove

The barred cuckoo-dove has a buff coloured throat and forehead which becomes pinkish grey at the crown. measures 37 to 41 cm (15 to 16 in) in length, and weighs 153 to 182 g (5.4 to 6.4 oz). Its iris is yellow or pale brown, the beak is black and short, and the feet are red. It has blackish brown upperparts. The back, mantle (between the nape and the starting of the back), rump, wing coverts, and scapulars have reddish brown fringes. The tail is blackish brown, and is heavily barred reddish brown.

It is similar to the little cuckoo-dove, but it is much larger and darker, and is black-barred on the mantle, breast, coverts, and tail.

== Distribution and habitat ==
The barred cuckoo-dove occurs from the Himalayas to Southeast Asia. It inhabits dense subtropical woodlands at altitudes of 800 to 3,000 m (2,600 to 9,800 ft) from sea level, on montane slopes. It prefers clearings and edges of old-growth forests and second growth forests.

== Behavior and ecology ==
The barred cuckoo-dove lives in small flocks. It has a loud kro-uum or u-va vocalization, in which the second note is louder than the first.

== Status and conservation ==
Since 1998, the barred cuckoo-dove has been listed least concern on the IUCN Red List, because it has a large range—more than 20,000 km^{2} (7,700 mi^{2}) and the population trend is stable. Also, although its population numbers have not been determined, it is thought to comprise more than 10,000 individuals.

== Local names ==
The Lepcha people of Sikkim call it ka ar fo. The Mizo people of Mizoram call it Ṭhumimeisei.
