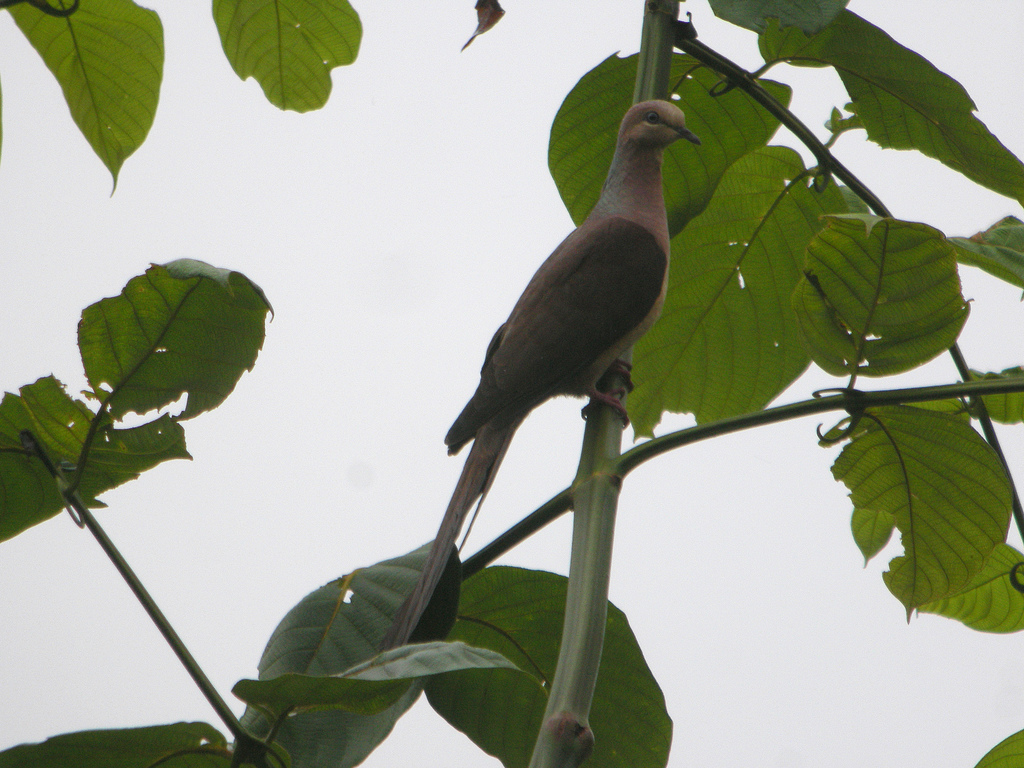
- Slender-billed cuckoo-dove, New Guinea.

Scientific classification
- Kingdom: Animalia
- Phylum: Chordata
- Class: Aves
- Order: Columbiformes
- Family: Columbidae
- Tribe: Columbini
- Genus: Macropygia; Swainson, 1837

Type species
- Macropygia tenuirostris Bonaparte, 1854

Species
- See text

= Macropygia =

Genus of birds

Macropygia is a genus of bird in the pigeon and dove family Columbidae. The genus is one of three genera known as cuckoo-doves. They are long tailed, range between 27 and 45 cm in length and have brown plumage. The genus now ranges from India and China through Indonesia and the Philippines to Vanuatu and Australia, though they originated from North and South America.

The genus Macropygia was introduced in 1837 by the English naturalist William Swainson. The name combines the Ancient Greek makros meaning "long" or "deep" and "-pugios" meaning "-rumped"). The type species is the brown cuckoo-dove (Macropygia phasianella).

The genus contains the following 16 species:

- Barred cuckoo-dove (Macropygia unchall)
- Amboyna cuckoo-dove (Macropygia amboinensis)
- Sultan's cuckoo-dove (Macropygia doreya)
- Sulawesi cuckoo-dove (Macropygia albicapilla)
- Ruddy cuckoo-dove (Macropygia emiliana)
- Enggano cuckoo-dove (Macropygia cinnamomea)
- Barusan cuckoo-dove (Macropygia modiglianii)
- Timor cuckoo-dove (Macropygia magna)
- Tanimbar cuckoo-dove (Macropygia timorlaoensis)
- Flores Sea cuckoo-dove (Macropygia macassariensis)
- Philippine cuckoo-dove (Macropygia tenuirostris)
- Brown cuckoo-dove (Macropygia phasianella)
- Andaman cuckoo-dove (Macropygia rufipennis)
- Bar-tailed cuckoo-dove (Macropygia nigrirostris)
- Spot-breasted cuckoo-dove (Macropygia mackinlayi)
- Little cuckoo-dove (Macropygia ruficeps)

Extinct species:

- † Huahine cuckoo-dove (Macropygia arevarevauupa), from Huahine in the Society Islands of French Polynesia; the youngest evidence of presence was dated 750 and 1250 years old
- † Marquesan cuckoo-dove (Macropygia heana) from the Marquesas Islands
