= Bar-necked cuckoo-dove =

The bar-necked cuckoo-dove, also called the dusky cuckoo-dove was split into the following species in 2016. The name "bar-necked cuckoo-dove" remains valid when used to describe the Macropygia magna species complex as all of its members have barred necks and breasts.

- Timor cuckoo-dove, Macropygia magna
- Tanimbar cuckoo-dove, Macropygia timorlaoensis
- Flores Sea cuckoo-dove, Macropygia macassariensis
