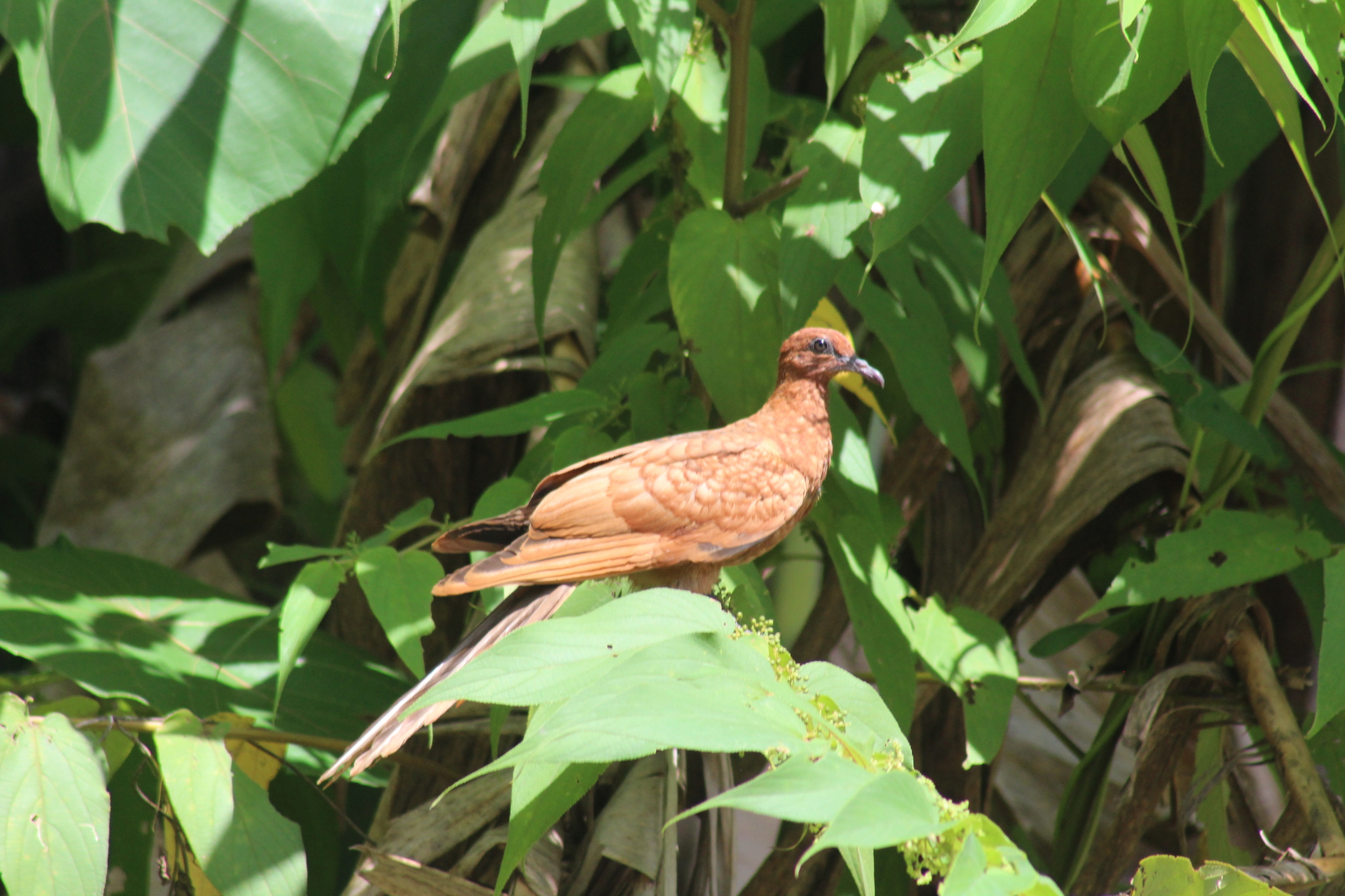

Conservation status
- Near Threatened (IUCN 3.1)

Scientific classification
- Kingdom: Animalia
- Phylum: Chordata
- Class: Aves
- Order: Columbiformes
- Family: Columbidae
- Genus: Macropygia
- Species: M. cinnamomea

Binomial name
- Macropygia cinnamomea Salvadori, 1892

= Enggano cuckoo-dove =

Species of bird

The Enggano cuckoo-dove (Macropygia cinnamomea) is a species of bird in the family Columbidae. It is endemic to Enggano Island in Indonesia. Until 2016, it was considered a subspecies of the ruddy cuckoo-dove.

== Distribution and habitat ==
The Enggano cuckoo-dove is endemic to the Indonesian island of Enggano, off the southwestern coast of Sumatra.
