= Marquesas cuckoo-dove =

Marquesas cuckoo-dove Temporal range: Late Holocene

Scientific classification
- Kingdom: Animalia
- Phylum: Chordata
- Class: Aves
- Order: Columbiformes
- Family: Columbidae
- Genus: Macropygia
- Species: M. heana

Binomial name
- Macropygia heana Steadman, 1992

Extinct species of bird

The Marquesas cuckoo-dove (Macropygia heana), also referred to as the Marquesan cuckoo-dove, is an extinct species of bird in the pigeon family. It was endemic to the Marquesas Islands of French Polynesia. It was described from subfossil bones recovered from the Hane archaeological site on the island of Ua Huka. The cuckoo-dove was a relatively large species, with long legs; its limb proportions suggesting a more terrestrial lifestyle than its congeners. The dove's extinction occurred either upon or shortly after the colonisation of the islands by ancient Polynesians.
