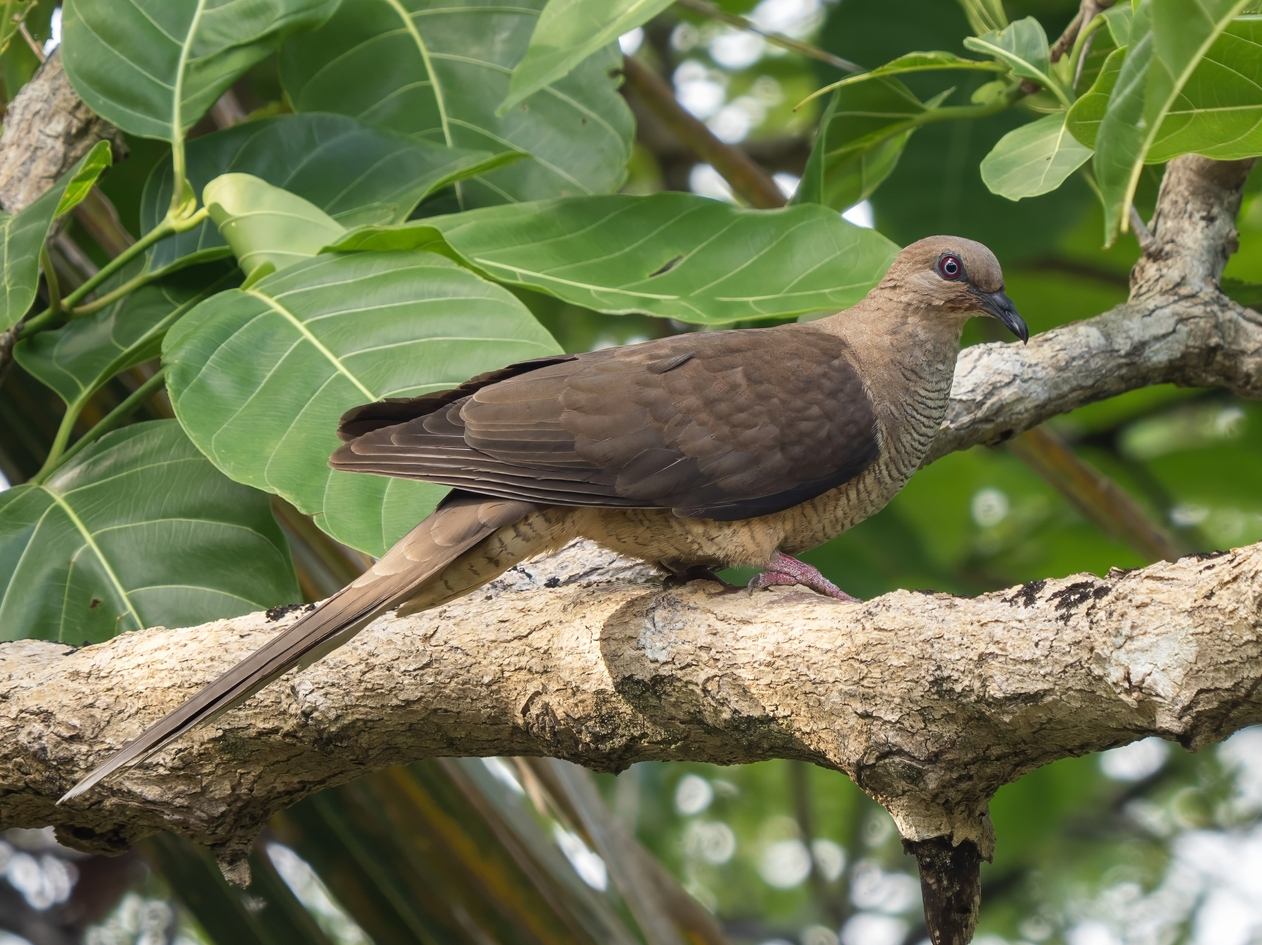

Scientific classification
- Kingdom: Animalia
- Phylum: Chordata
- Class: Aves
- Order: Columbiformes
- Family: Columbidae
- Genus: Macropygia
- Species: M. macassariensis

Binomial name
- Macropygia macassariensis Wallace, 1865

= Flores Sea cuckoo-dove =

Species of bird

The Flores Sea cuckoo-dove (Macropygia macassariensis) is a species of bird in the family Columbidae. It is found on Sulawesi, Tanakeke and Selayar Islands, and some of the eastern Lesser Sundas. It was previously lumped together with the Tanimbar cuckoo-dove and the Timor cuckoo-dove as the dusky or bar-necked cuckoo-dove. The Flores Sea cuckoo-dove has two subspecies:

- M. m. macassariensis Wallace, 1865 - southwest Sulawesi, Selayar and Tanakeke Islands.
- M. m. longa Meise, 1930 - Tanahjampea and Kalaotoa Is. (eastern Lesser Sundas)
