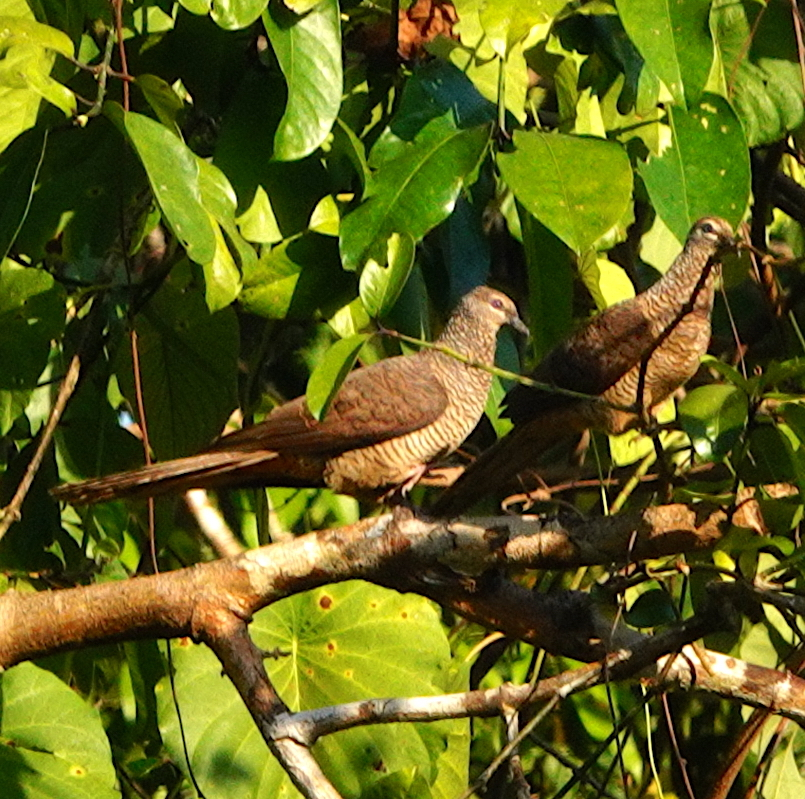

Scientific classification
- Kingdom: Animalia
- Phylum: Chordata
- Class: Aves
- Order: Columbiformes
- Family: Columbidae
- Genus: Macropygia
- Species: M. timorlaoensis

Binomial name
- Macropygia timorlaoensis Meyer, AB, 1884

= Tanimbar cuckoo-dove =

Species of bird

The Tanimbar cuckoo-dove (Macropygia timorlaoensis) is a species of bird in the family Columbidae. It is endemic to the Tanimbar Islands in Indonesia. It was previously grouped together with the Timor cuckoo-dove and the Flores Sea cuckoo-dove as the dusky or bar-necked cuckoo-dove.
