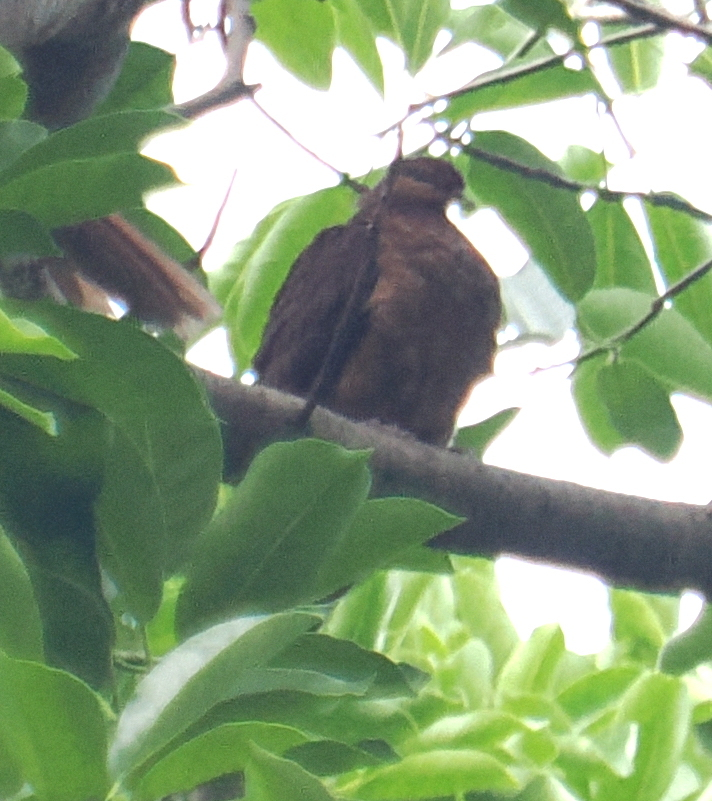

Conservation status
- Least Concern (IUCN 3.1)

Scientific classification
- Kingdom: Animalia
- Phylum: Chordata
- Class: Aves
- Order: Columbiformes
- Family: Columbidae
- Genus: Macropygia
- Species: M. magna

Binomial name
- Macropygia magna Wallace, 1864

= Timor cuckoo-dove =

Species of bird

The Timor cuckoo-dove (Macropygia magna) is a species of bird in the family Columbidae. It is found in Timor, Wetar, and the eastern Lesser Sunda Islands. It was previously lumped together with the Tanimbar cuckoo-dove and the Flores Sea cuckoo-dove as the dusky or bar-necked cuckoo-dove. It is rated as a species of least concern on the International Union for Conservation of Nature Red List of Endangered Species.

== Status and conservation ==
Since 1988, the Timor cuckoo-dove has been rated as a species of least concern on the IUCN Red List of Endangered Species. This is because although it has a restricted range, the range size is more than 20,000 km^{2} (7,700 mi^{2}), and because it has a stable population trend. In addition, although its population numbers have not been determined, it is thought to be above 10,000, which is above the criterion to warrant a vulnerable rating. It is described to be rarely found on Timor, but commonly found on the Tanimbar Islands and on Kalaotoa island. It is thought to have no major threat.
