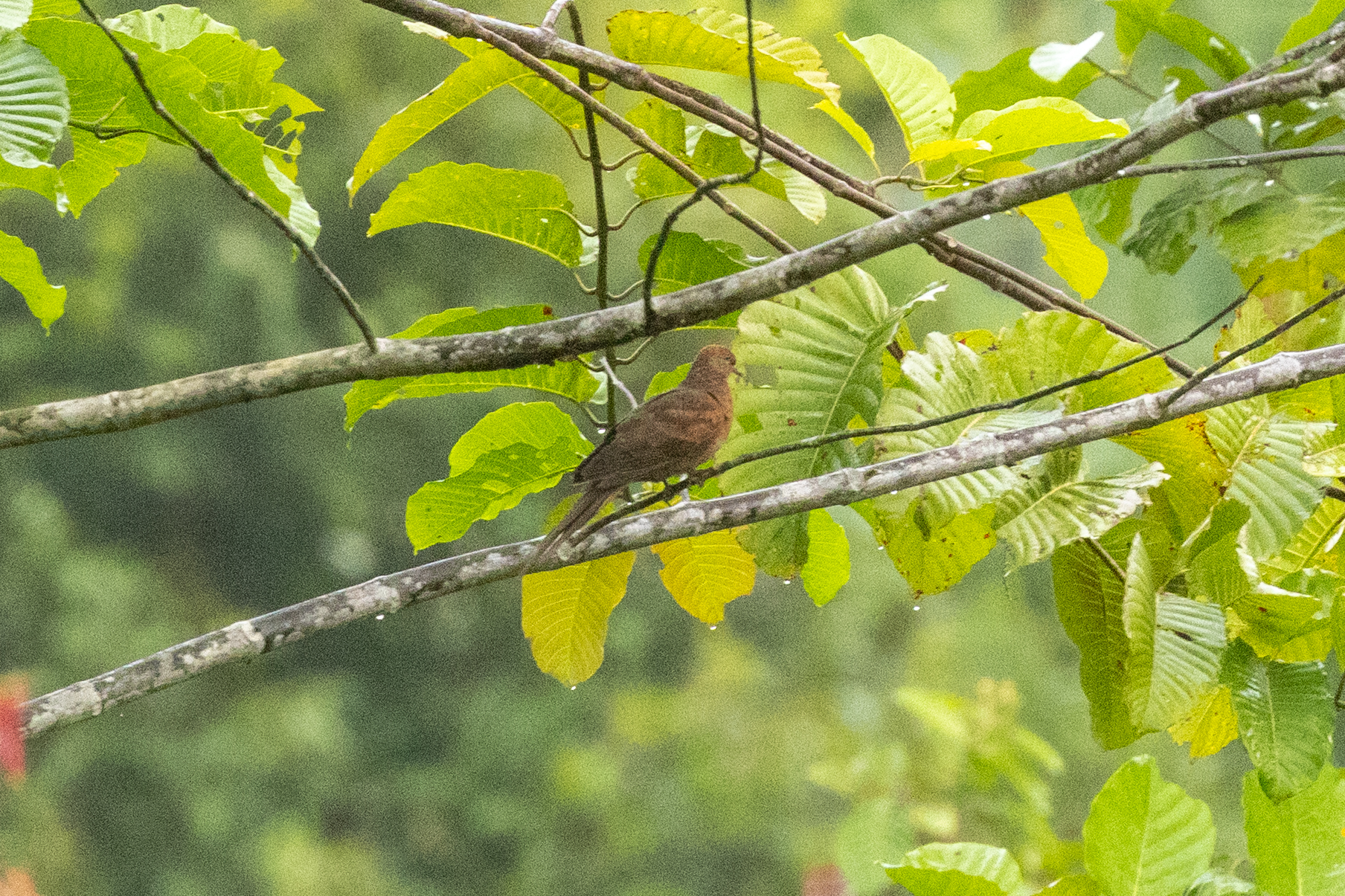

Scientific classification
- Kingdom: Animalia
- Phylum: Chordata
- Class: Aves
- Order: Columbiformes
- Family: Columbidae
- Genus: Macropygia
- Species: M. modiglianii

Binomial name
- Macropygia modiglianii Salvadori, 1887

Subspecies
- See text

= Barusan cuckoo-dove =

Species of bird

The Barusan cuckoo-dove (Macropygia modiglianii) is a species of bird in the family Columbidae. It is found on three of the western Sumatran islands.

The Barusan cuckoo-dove was formerly considered as a subspecies of the ruddy cuckoo-dove. It was promoted to species status based on the results of an acoustic study published in 2016.

Three subspecies are recognised, each endemic to a specific island:

- M. m. modiglianii Salvadori, 1887 – Nias Island
- M. m. elassa Oberholser, 1912 – Mentawai Islands
- M. m. hypopercna Oberholser, 1912 – Simeulue Island
