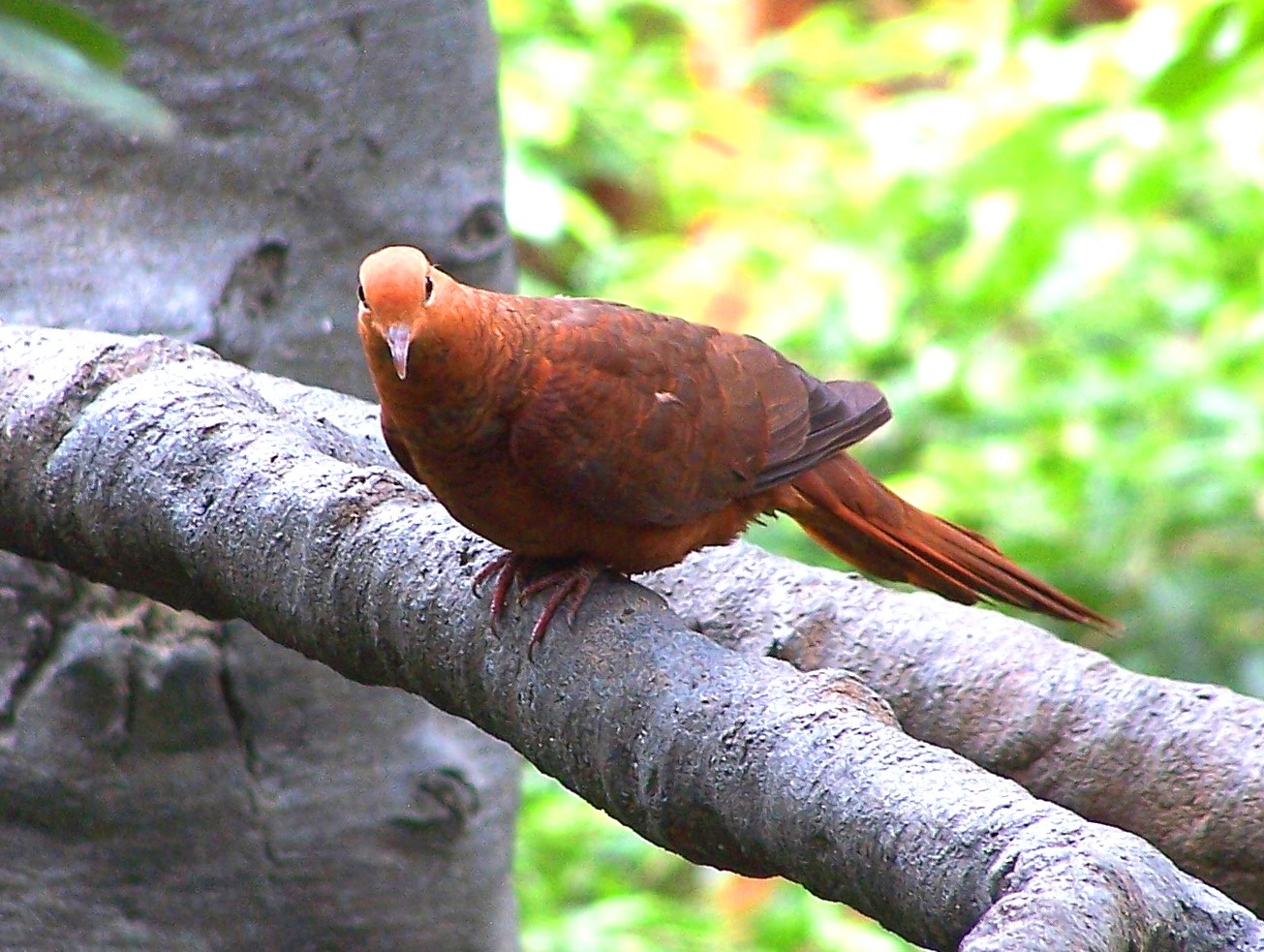

Conservation status
- Least Concern (IUCN 3.1)

Scientific classification
- Kingdom: Animalia
- Phylum: Chordata
- Class: Aves
- Order: Columbiformes
- Family: Columbidae
- Genus: Macropygia
- Species: M. emiliana

Binomial name
- Macropygia emiliana Bonaparte, 1854

Subspecies
- See text

= Ruddy cuckoo-dove =

Species of bird

The ruddy cuckoo-dove (Macropygia emiliana) is a species of bird in the family Columbidae. It is a medium-sized, reddish brown cuckoo-dove, found in Brunei, Indonesia, and Malaysia. It is rated as a species of least concern on the International Union for Conservation of Nature Red List of Endangered Species.

== Taxonomy ==
The ruddy cuckoo-dove was first described by the French biologist and ornithologist Charles Lucien Jules Laurent Bonaparte in 1854. It was split from the slender-billed cuckoo-dove in 2003. It has two remaining sub-species:

- M. e. emiliana Bonaparte, 1854 - Java to western Lesser Sunda Islands
- M. e. megala Siebers, 1929 - Kangean Islands

Five former subspecies of the ruddy cuckoo-dove were reassigned by the IOU in 2016:

- M. e. cinnamomea Salvadori, 1892 - Enggano Island was split from the ruddy cuckoo-dove as the Enggano cuckoo-dove.
- M. e. borneensis Robinson & Kloss, 1921 - northern Borneo is now provisionally considered a subspecies of the Philippine cuckoo-dove(Macropygia tenuirostris borneensis).
- M. e. modiglianii Salvadori, 1887 - western Sumatran islands is now considered a subspecies of the Barusan cuckoo-dove.
- M. e. elassa Oberholser, 1912 - Mentawai Islands is now considered a subspecies of the Barusan cuckoo-dove.
- M. e. hypopercna Oberholser, 1912 - Simeulue Island is now considered a subspecies of the Barusan cuckoo-dove.

== Description ==
The ruddy cuckoo-dove is a medium-sized, reddish brown dove, that measures 30 to 37 cm (12 to 15 in) in length. It has a uniformly ruddy head, and purplish brown, black-barred breast. The neck is pink iridescent. The tail is long and slender, and lacks any pale grey or white at the tip. The central tail coverts are uniformly ruddy, and lack any black barring. The juvenile resembles the female in appearance, but is more strongly barred.

== Status and conservation ==
Since 1988, the ruddy cuckoo-dove has been rated as a species of least concern on the IUCN Red List of Endangered Species. This is because it has a very large range—more than 20,000 km^{2} (7,700 mi^{2})—and because although its population has been declining, the rate of decrease is considered to be less over 30% decline over ten years or three generations. In addition, although its population numbers have not been determined, it is thought to be above 10,000, which is above the criterion to warrant a vulnerable rating. It is described to be rarely found, but is common on the Borneo Island and on islands off the south and west coasts Sumatra. It is thought to face a population decline due to habitat destruction.
