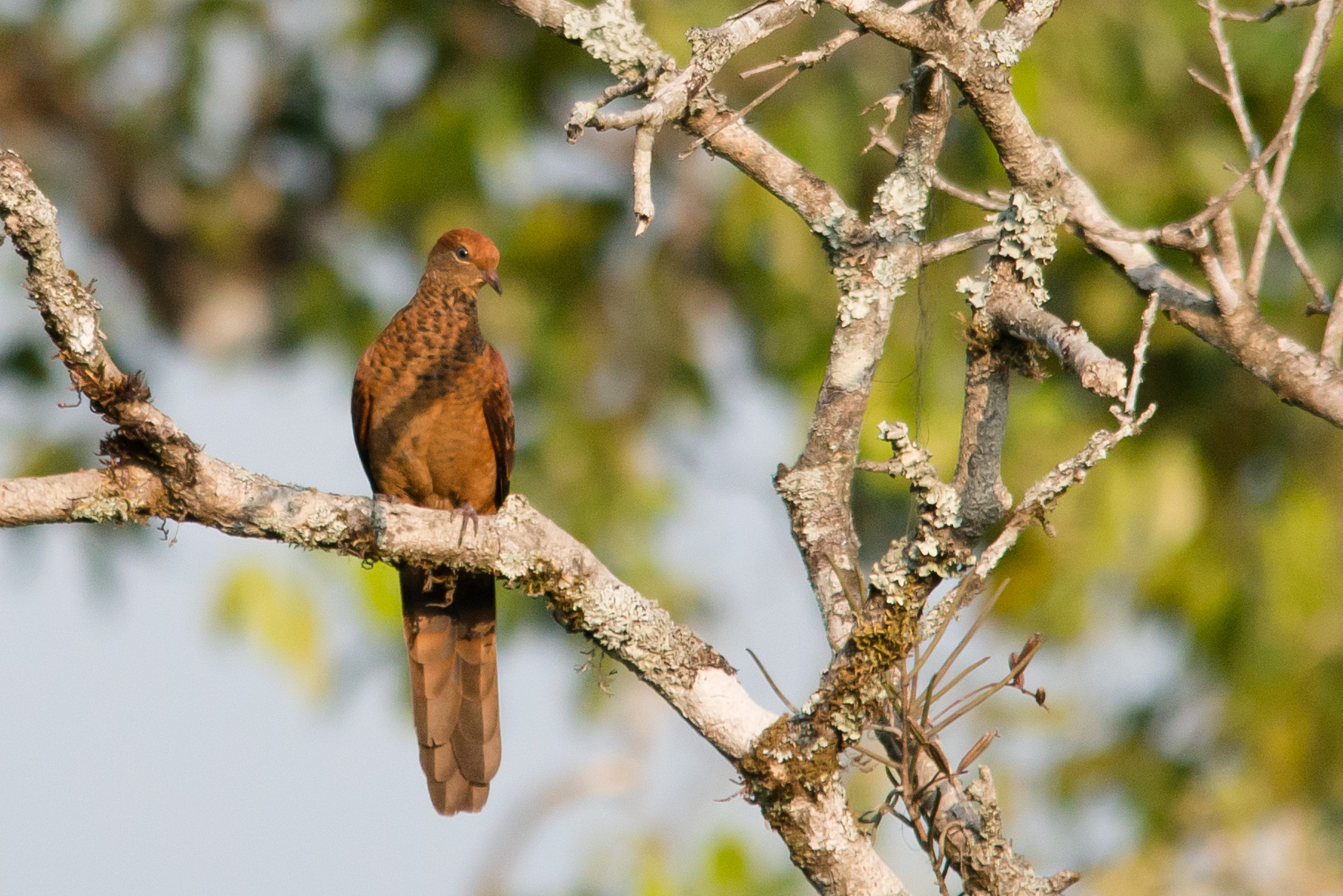

Conservation status
- Least Concern (IUCN 3.1)

Scientific classification
- Kingdom: Animalia
- Phylum: Chordata
- Class: Aves
- Order: Columbiformes
- Family: Columbidae
- Genus: Macropygia
- Species: M. ruficeps

Binomial name
- Macropygia ruficeps (Temminck, 1835)

= Little cuckoo-dove =

Species of bird

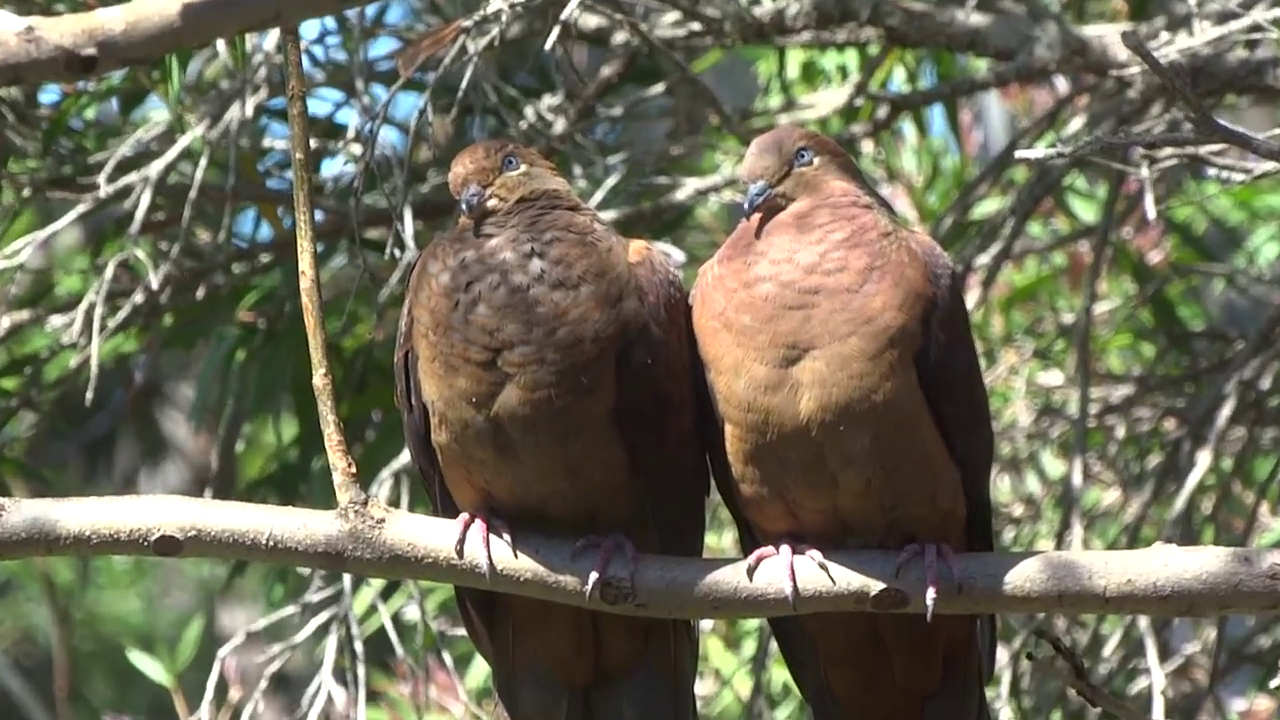

The little cuckoo-dove (Macropygia ruficeps) is a species of bird in the family Columbidae. It is a reddish brown pigeon, and is found in Brunei, China, Indonesia, Laos, Malaysia, Myanmar, Thailand, and Vietnam. It is listed as a species of least concern on the International Union for Conservation of Nature Red List of Endangered Species.

== Description ==
The little cuckoo-dove is a reddish brown pigeon, measuring 27 to 30 cm (11 to 12 in) in length, and weighing 74 to 88 g (2.6 to 3.1 oz). It has cinnamon buff plumage. It has greyish white irides. The beak is brown, and has a black tip. The feet are coral red in colour. The tail is long, and it differentiates the little cuckoo-dove from other sympatric (species existing in the same geographic area and thus frequently encountering one another) pigeons. Little cuckoo-doves travel in loose flocks.

== Distribution and habitat ==
The little cuckoo-dove is found in evergreen hill forests and forest peripheries, in the north of its range. Southwards, it is found in drier forests and in adjacent areas of second-growth forests. It is also found in cultivated areas. It is commonly found in submontane habitats at elevations of 300 to 2,000 m (980 to 6,560 ft) above sea level. It has also been recorded at heights of at least 3,000 metres (9,800 ft) from sea level on Mount Kinabulu, and sometimes at sea level.

== Status and conservation ==
Since 1998, the little cuckoo-dove has been rated as a species of least concern on the IUCN Red List of Endangered Species. This is because it has a large range—more than 20,000 km^{2} (7,700 mi^{2})—and because it has a stable population trend. Also, although its population numbers have not been determined, they are thought to be above 10,000, which is above the criterion to warrant a vulnerable rating. It is described to be common in the southern part of its range, and uncommon in the northern part of its range. It is thought to have no major threats.
