= Sultan's cuckoo-dove =

Scientific classification
- Kingdom: Animalia
- Phylum: Chordata
- Class: Aves
- Order: Columbiformes
- Family: Columbidae
- Genus: Macropygia
- Species: M. doreya

Binomial name
- Macropygia doreya Bonaparte, 1854

Subspecies
- See text

Species of bird

Sultan's cuckoo-dove (Macropygia doreya) is a dove in the genus Macropygia found in the northern Moluccas to New Guinea and the western Papuan islands. It was one of three new species defined when the slender-billed cuckoo-dove was split up in 2016.

== Description ==
They are typically about 35–37 centimetres (14–15 in) long. The males tend to have a slight rose/green colouration on their nape and neck. Many subspecies have whitish underparts, fine dark barring below and/or a whitish cap.

The call of this dove is a very loud "whoop-a whoop" with some differences depending on the subspecies involved.

Sultan's cuckoo-dove inhabits rainforest, woodland, scrubland and rainforest regrowth areas.

The doves can often be seen in pairs or groups. Its diet consists of berries from both native plants and introduced weed species. They can be nomadic, depending on the supplies of food. They tend to fly short distances and low to the ground with great strength.

Breeding occurs in spring and summer. The nest is a flat platform of sticks and vines, either in a fork of a tree or on top of a low tree. One, creamy white, egg is laid.

== Subspecies ==
Three subspecies are recognised:

- M. d. doreya Bonaparte, 1854 – northwestern New Guinea including Raja Ampat Islands (off western New Guinea)
- M. d. balim Rand, 1941 – Balim Valley, western New Guinea
- M. d. albiceps Bonaparte, 1856 – Morotai to Obi Islands (northern Moluccas)

The Sulawesi cuckoo-dove (Macropygia albicapilla) was formerly considered as a subspecies.
