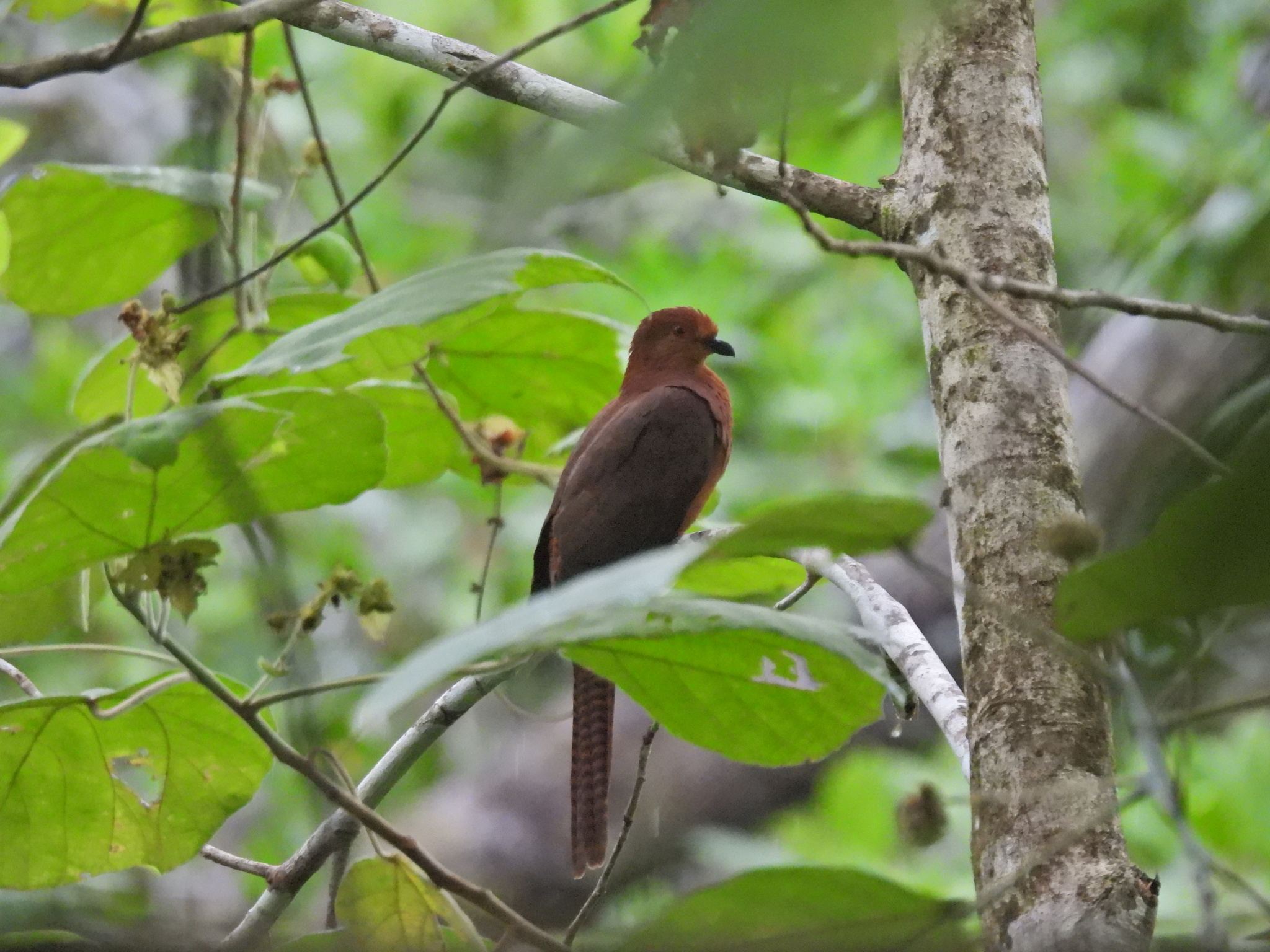

Conservation status
- Least Concern (IUCN 3.1)

Scientific classification
- Kingdom: Animalia
- Phylum: Chordata
- Class: Aves
- Order: Columbiformes
- Family: Columbidae
- Genus: Macropygia
- Species: M. nigrirostris

Binomial name
- Macropygia nigrirostris Salvadori, 1876

= Bar-tailed cuckoo-dove =

Species of bird

The bar-tailed cuckoo-dove or black-billed cuckoo-dove (Macropygia nigrirostris) is a species of bird in the family Columbidae. It is native to New Guinea and the Bismarck Archipelago. It is rated as a species of least concern on the International Union for Conservation of Nature Red List of Endangered Species.

== Description ==
The bar-tailed cuckoo-dove measures 29 centimetres (11 in) in length. It has a short, completely black bill. The six central tail feathers are black barred. The central breast feathers are not bifurcated. The male is ruddy-brown, with no clear distinction between the underparts and the upperparts. The female, however, has black barred upperparts. The juvenile is similar to the female, but its tail is barred irregularly.

It is differentiated from other sympatric (other species existing in the same geographic area and thus frequently encountering with it) pigeons other than cuckoo-doves, by its chestnut brown plumage and slender, long tail.

== Distribution and habitat ==
It is native to Papua New Guinea and Indonesia. It inhabits old-growth forests, forest peripheries, and second-growth forests. It also occurs commonly on submontane forests on altitudes of up to 2,600 metres (8,500 ft) from sea levels, and occasionally at sea levels on hills adjacent to coasts.

== Status and conservation ==
Since 1988, the bar-tailed cuckoo-dove has been rated as a species of least concern on the IUCN Red List of Endangered Species. This is because it has a very large range—more than 20,000 km^{2} (7,700 mi^{2})—and because it has a stable population trend. Also, although its population numbers has not been determined, it is commonly found throughout most of its distribution, it is thought to be above 10,000 which is above the criterion to warrant it a vulnerable rating. There are no substantial threats thought to be to this species.
