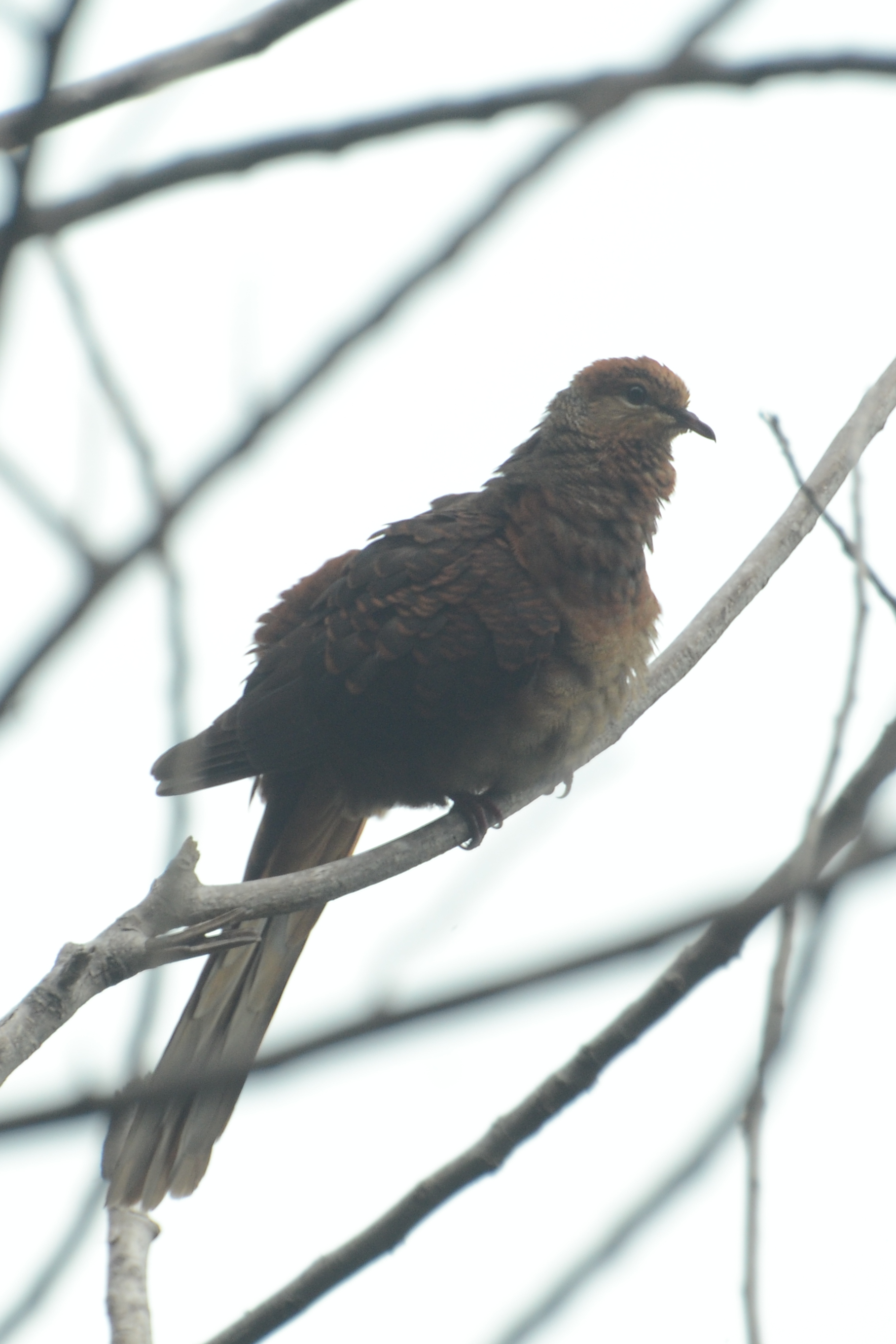

Conservation status
- Least Concern (IUCN 3.1)

Scientific classification
- Kingdom: Animalia
- Phylum: Chordata
- Class: Aves
- Order: Columbiformes
- Family: Columbidae
- Genus: Macropygia
- Species: M. amboinensis

Binomial name
- Macropygia amboinensis (Linnaeus, 1766)

Subspecies
- See text

Synonyms
- Columba amboinensis Linnaeus, 1766

= Amboyna cuckoo-dove =

Species of bird

The Amboyna cuckoo-dove (Macropygia amboinensis) is a dove in the genus Macropygia found in the Moluccas and New Guinea. It was one of three new species defined when the slender-billed cuckoo-dove was split up in 2016 and retains the Latin binomial of the former species.^{[1]}

== Taxonomy ==
In 1760 the French zoologist Mathurin Jacques Brisson included a description of the Amboyna cuckoo-dove in his six volume Ornithologie based on a specimen collected on Ambon Island, one of the Maluku Islands of Indonesia. He used the French name La tourterelle d'Amboine and the Latin Turtur amboinensis. Although Brisson coined Latin names, these do not conform to the binomial system and are not recognised by the International Commission on Zoological Nomenclature. When in 1766 the Swedish naturalist Carl Linnaeus updated his Systema Naturae for the twelfth edition, he added 240 species that had been previously described by Brisson. One of these was the Amboyna cuckoo-dove which he placed with all the other pigeons in the genus Columba. Linnaeus included a brief description, coined the binomial name Columba amboinensis and cited Brisson's work. The species is now placed in the genus Macropygia was introduced in 1837 by the English naturalist William Swainson.

The Amboyna cuckoo-dove was formerly considered as conspecific with the sultan's cuckoo-dove (Macropygia doreya). The species was split based on an analysis of the vocalisations published in 2016.

Nine subspecies are recognized:

- M. a. amboinensis (Linnaeus, 1766) - Central Moluccas: Buru, Seram, Ambon and Seram Laut
- M. a. admiralitatis Mayr, 1937 - Admiralty Islands
- M. a. carteretia Bonaparte, 1854 - Bismarck Archipelago (except Admiralty Islands). Includes M. a. hueskeri (Mayr & Diamond, 2001)
- M. a. keyensis Salvadori, 1876 - Kai Islands
- M. a. maforensis Salvadori, 1878 - Numfor Island
- M. a. griseinucha Salvadori, 1876 - Mios Num
- M. a. meeki Rothschild & Hartert, 1915 - Manam Island
- M. a. cinereiceps Tristram, 1889 - D'Entrecasteaux Islands. Includes M. a. goldiei and kerstingi (Mayr 1941, Mees 1982)
- M. a. cunctata Hartert, 1899 - Louisiade Archipelago (Misima, Tagula and Rossel Islands)

== Description ==
The Amboyna cuckoo-dove is typically about 35–37 centimetres (14–15 in) long. Males tend to have a slight rose/green colouration on their nape and neck. In Indonesia and Papua New Guinea, many subspecies have whitish underparts, fine dark barring below and/or a whitish cap.

The call of this dove is a very loud "whoop-a whoop" with some differences depending on the subspecies involved.

== Distribution and habitat ==
The Amboyna cuckoo-dove inhabits rainforest, woodland, scrubland and rainforest regrowth areas.

== Behaviour and ecology ==
The doves can often be seen in pairs or groups. Its diet consists of berries from both native plants and introduced weed species. They can be nomadic, depending on the supplies of food. They tend to fly short distances and low to the ground with great strength.

Breeding occurs in spring and summer. The nest is a flat platform of sticks and vines, either in a fork of a tree or on top of a low tree. One, creamy white, egg is laid.
