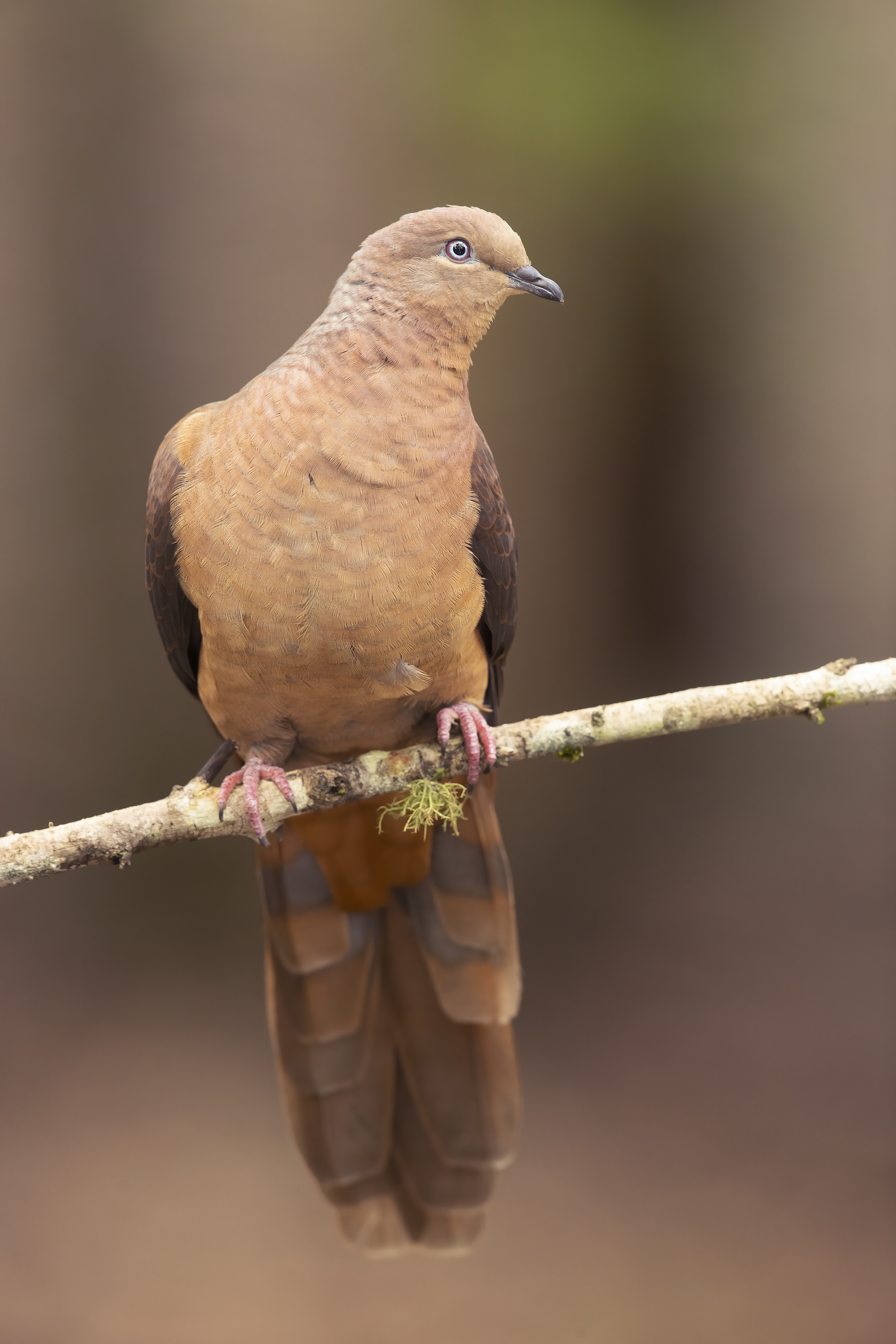
- subspecies phasianella
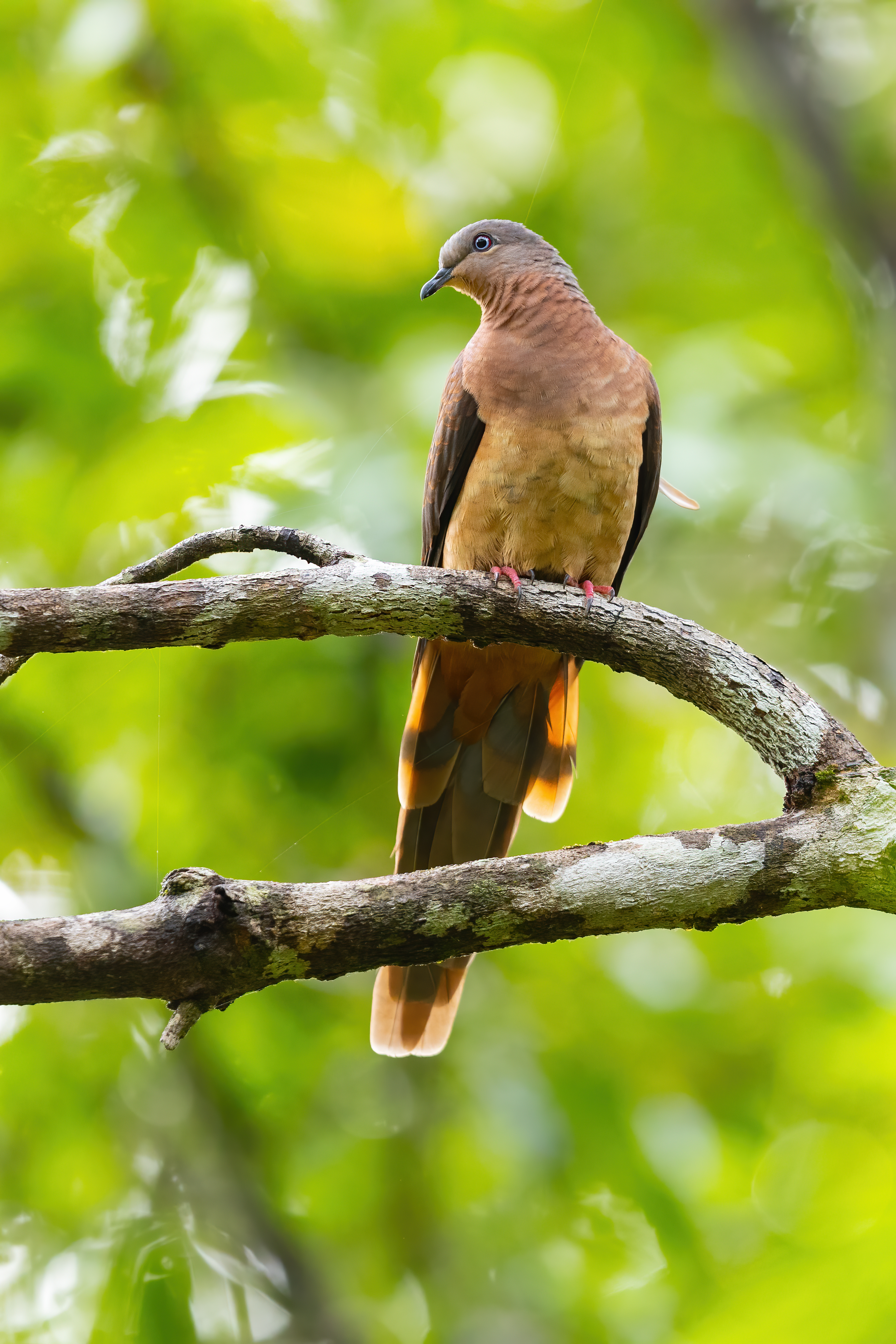
- subspecies quinkan

Conservation status
- Least Concern (IUCN 3.1)

Scientific classification
- Kingdom: Animalia
- Phylum: Chordata
- Class: Aves
- Order: Columbiformes
- Family: Columbidae
- Genus: Macropygia
- Species: M. phasianella

Binomial name
- Macropygia phasianella (Temminck, 1821)

Subspecies
- See text

= Brown cuckoo-dove =

Species of bird

The brown cuckoo-dove (Macropygia phasianella) is a dove in the genus Macropygia found in Australia from Weipa and Aurukun in the north to Bega in the south, and most inland at Atherton and Toowoomba. It is sometimes called the "brown pigeon" or "pheasant pigeon", but both terms are best avoided, as they can lead to confusion with the brown doves and the true pheasant pigeon. It was one of three new species defined when the slender-billed cuckoo-dove was split in 2016.

== Taxonomy ==
The brown cuckoo-dove was formally described in 1821 by the Dutch zoologist Coenraad Jacob Temminck from a specimen collected near Port Jackson in New South Wales, Australia. He coined the binomial name Columba phasianella. The specific name is a diminutive of the Latin phasianus, meaning "pheasant". The brown cuckoo-dove is now placed in the genus Macropygia, which was introduced by the English naturalist William Swainson in 1837.

Three subspecies are recognised:

- M. p. quinkan Schodde, 1989 - Cape York Peninsula
- M. p. robinsoni Mathews, 1912 - Queensland
- M. p. phasianella (Temminck, 1821) - East and Southeast Australia

== Description ==
The brown cuckoo-dove is from 40 to 43 centimetres (16 to 17 in) in length. The feathers are a rich rusty-brown colour, and the short wings, long tail and back are darker. The males tend to have a slight rose/green colouration on their nape and neck.

The call of this dove is a very loud "whoop-a whoop" with some differences depending on the subspecies involved.

The brown cuckoo-dove inhabits rainforest, woodland, scrubland and rainforest regrowth areas.

The doves can often be seen in pairs or groups. Its diet consists of berries from both native plants and introduced weed species. They can be nomadic, depending on the supplies of food. They tend to fly short distances and low to the ground with great strength.

Breeding occurs in spring and summer. The nest is a flat platform of sticks and vines, either in a fork of a tree or on top of a low tree. One, creamy white, egg is laid.

Kobble Creek, SE Queensland
