= Slender-billed cuckoo-dove =

The slender-billed cuckoo-dove (formerly Macropygia amboinensis) was until recently the name of a species of bird in the family Columbidae. Its range covered Brunei, Indonesia, Malaysia, Papua New Guinea and northern Australia. The binomial M. amboinensis now refers to the Amboyna cuckoo-dove. The taxonomy of the slender-billed cuckoo-dove was complex, but most authorities now split it into four species based on analyses of vocalizations. This will be further refined by future genetic analyses.

In 2003 the ruddy cuckoo-dove (Macropygia emiliana) of Brunei, Indonesia, and Malaysia was split from the slender-billed cuckoo-dove (Dickinson, 2003).

In 2016 the slender-billed cuckoo-dove was split into the following species:

- Brown cuckoo-dove (Macropygia phasianella) of eastern Australia
- Amboyna cuckoo-dove (Macropygia amboinensis) of eastern Indonesia and Papua New Guinea
- Sultan's cuckoo-dove (Macropygia doreya) of Sulawesi and the northern Moluccas
