= List of birds of Ceará =

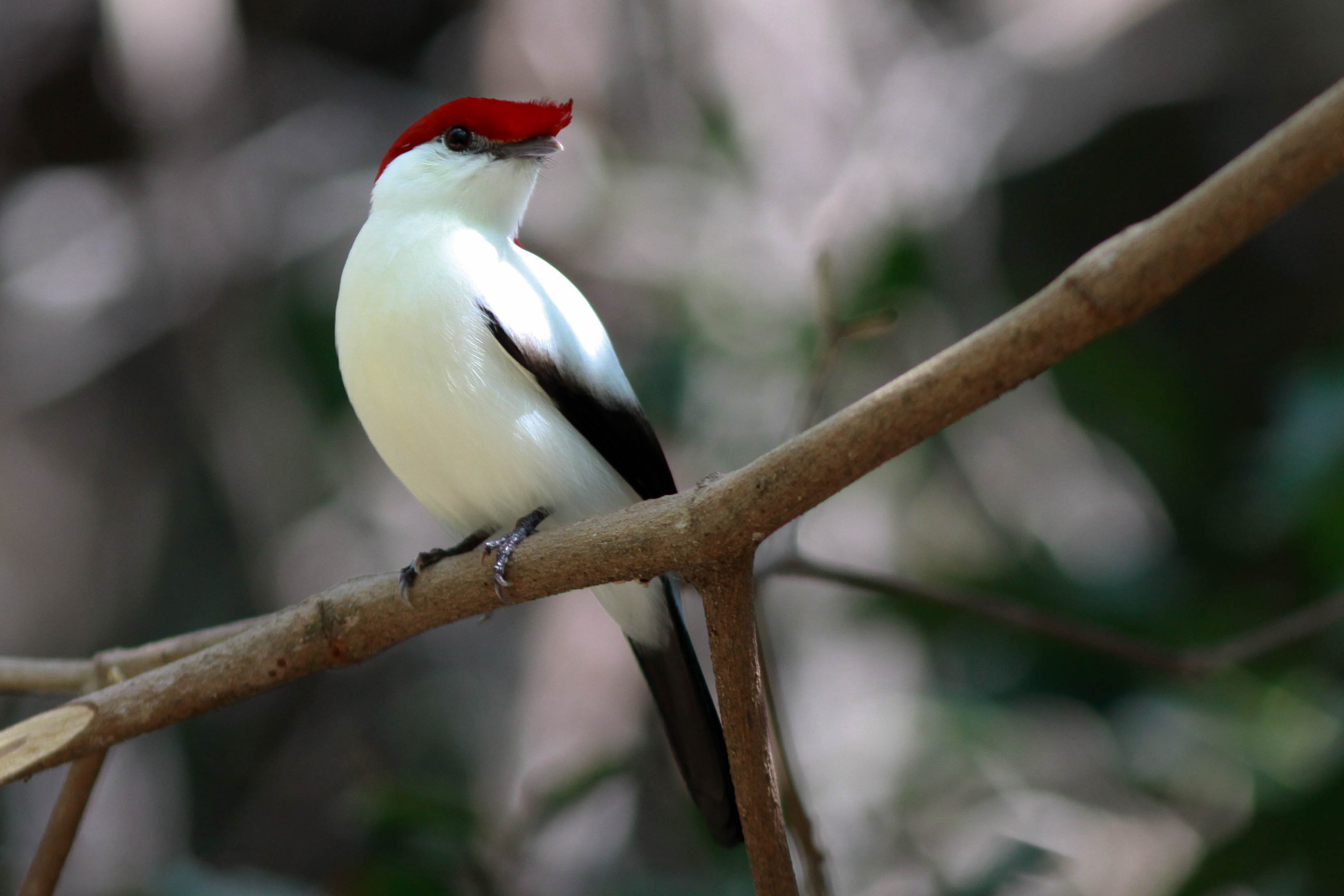
Araripe manakin

This list of birds of Ceará includes species documented in the Brazilian state of Ceará. The backbone of this list is provided by Avibase, and all additions that differ from this list have citations. As of November 2024, there are 577 recorded bird species in Ceará.

The following tags note species in each of those categories:

- (A) Accidental - species not regularly occurring in Ceará
- (EB) Endemic to Brazil - species that is only found in Brazil
- (ES) Endemic to Ceará - species that is only found in Ceará
- (I) Introduced - species that is not native to Ceará

== Rheas ==
Order: Rheiformes Family: Rheidae

- Greater rhea (Rhea americana) (A)

== Tinamous ==
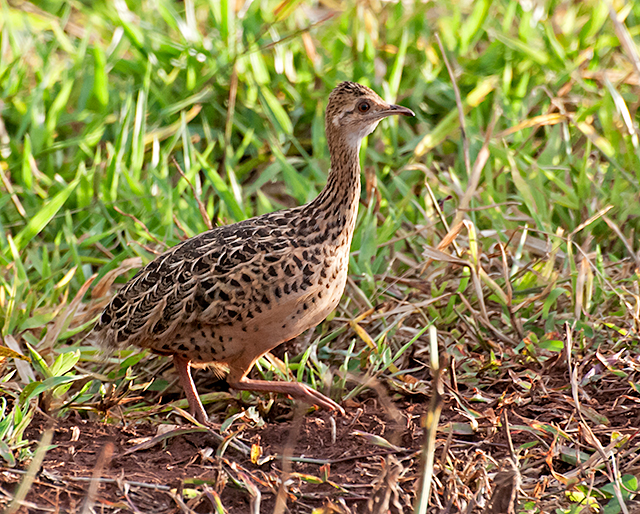
Spotted nothura

Order: Tinamiformes Family: Tinamidae

- Yellow-legged tinamou (Crypturellus noctivagus) (EB)
- Small-billed tinamou (Crypturellus parvirostris)
- Tataupa tinamou (Crypturellus tataupa)
- Red-winged tinamou (Rhynchotus rufescens)
- White-bellied nothura (Nothura boraquira)
- Spotted nothura (Nothura maculosa)

== Screamers ==
Order: Anseriformes Family: Anhimidae

- Horned screamer (Anhima cornuta)

== Ducks, geese, and waterfowl ==
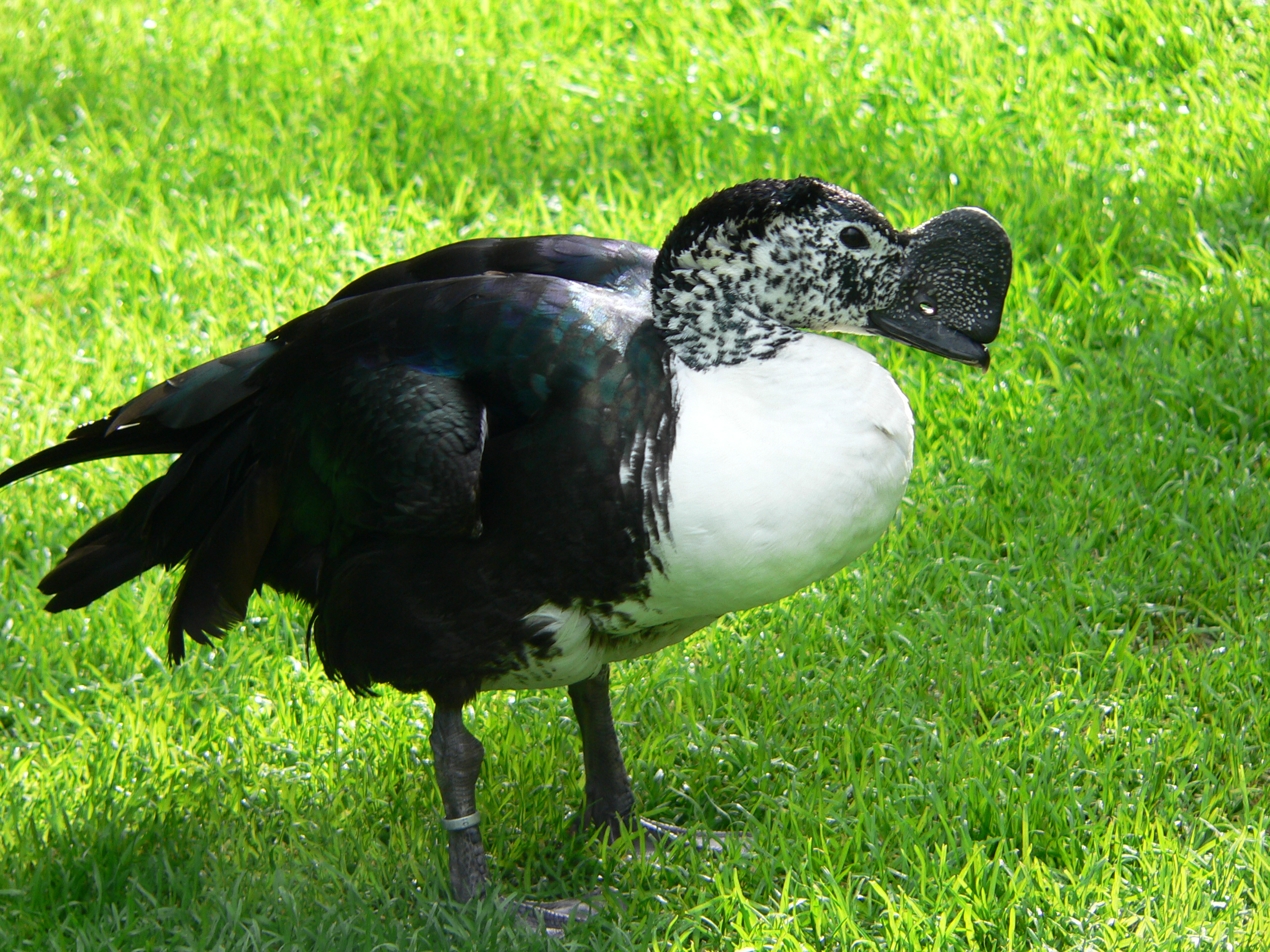
Comb duck

Order: Anseriformes Family: Anatidae

- Fulvous whistling duck (Dendrocygna bicolor)
- White-faced whistling duck (Dendrocygna viduata)
- Black-bellied whistling duck (Dendrocygna autumnalis)
- Muscovy duck (Cairina moschata)
- Comb duck (Sarkidiornis sylvicola)
- Brazilian teal (Amazonetta brasiliensis)
- Blue-winged teal (Spatula discors)
- White-cheeked pintail (Anas bahamensis)
- Southern pochard (Netta erythrophthalma)
- Masked duck (Nomonyx dominicus)

== Chachalacas, guans, and curassows ==
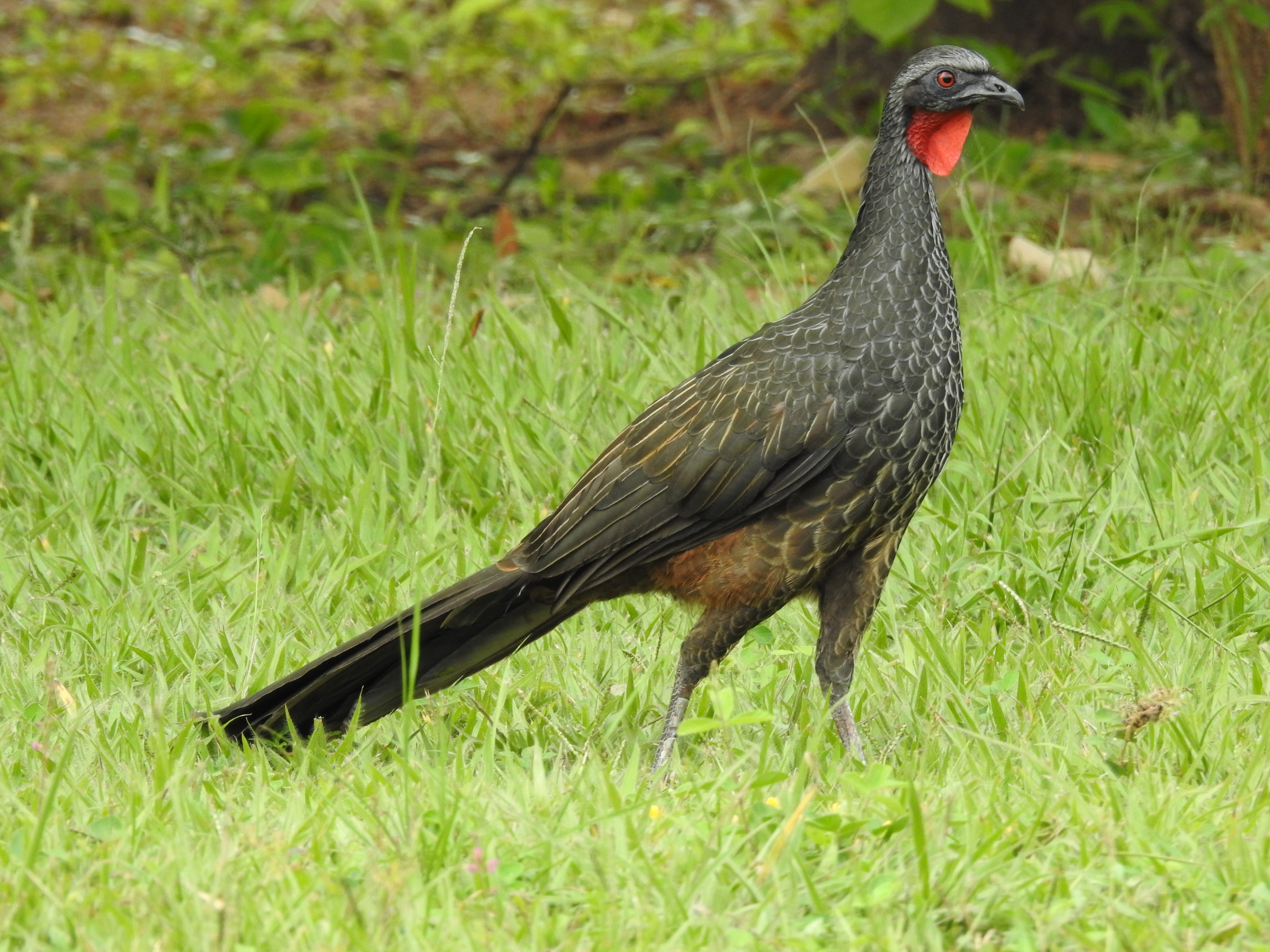
Rusty-margined guan

Order: Galliformes Family: Cracidae

- Rusty-margined guan (Penelope superciliaris)
- White-browed guan (Penelope jacucaca) (EB)

== New World quail ==
Order: Galliformes Family: Odontophoridae

- Spot-winged wood quail (Odontophorus capueira)

== Grebes ==
Order: Podicipediformes Family: Podicipedidae

- Pied-billed grebe (Podilymbus podiceps)
- Least grebe (Tachybaptus dominicus)

== Doves and pigeons ==
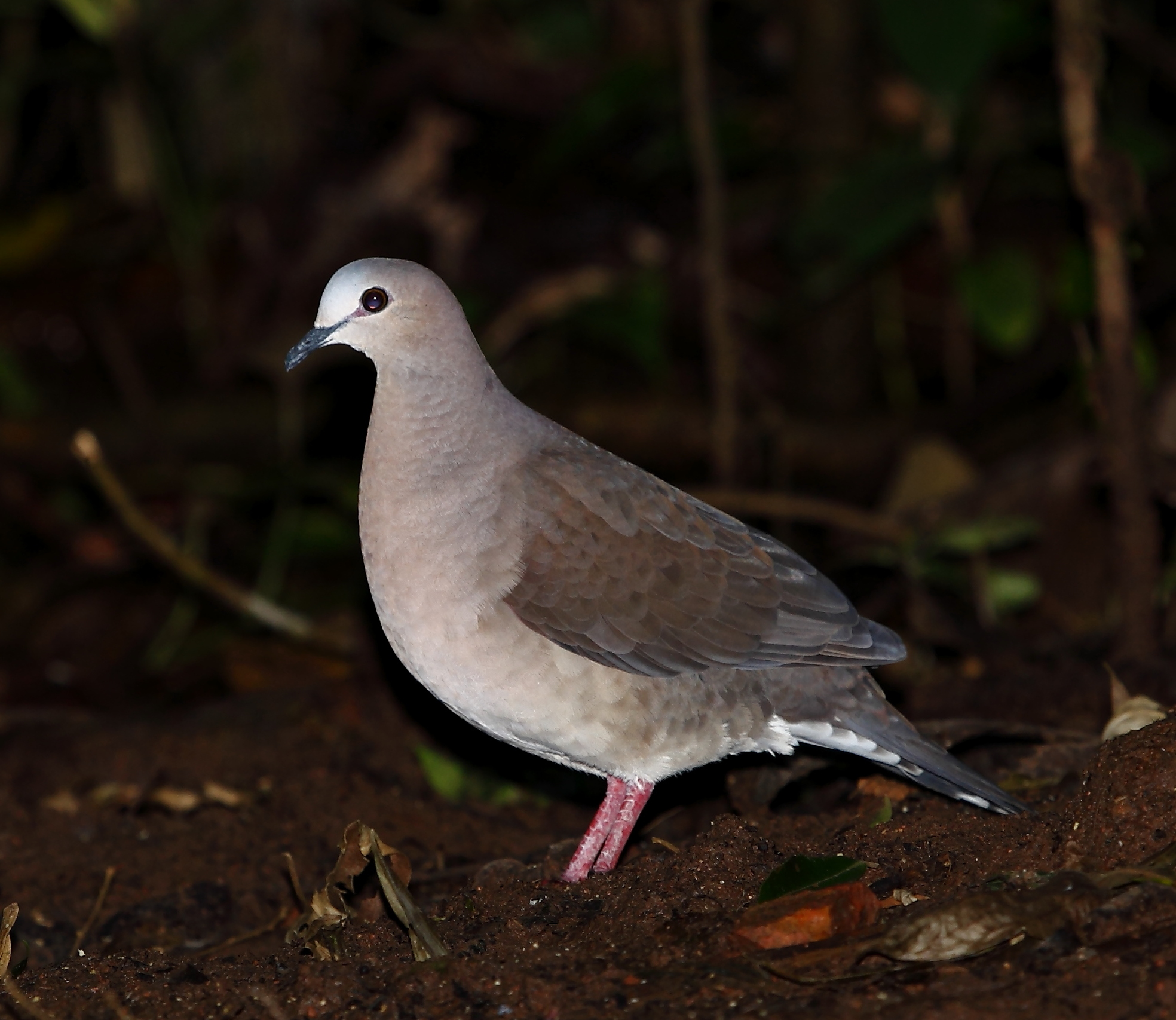
Grey-fronted dove

Order: Columbiformes Family: Columbidae

- Rock pigeon (Columba livia) (I)
- Picazuro pigeon (Patagioenas picazuro)
- White-tipped dove (Leptotila verreauxi)
- Grey-fronted dove (Leptotila rufaxilla)
- Eared dove (Zenaida auriculata)
- Blue ground dove (Claravis pretiosa)
- Common ground dove (Columbina passerina)
- Plain-breasted ground dove (Columbina minuta)
- Ruddy ground dove (Columbina talpacoti)
- Picui ground dove (Columbina picui)
- Scaled dove (Columbina squammata)

== Potoos ==
Order: Nyctibiiformes Family: Nyctibiidae

- Common potoo (Nyctibius griseus)

== Nightjars ==
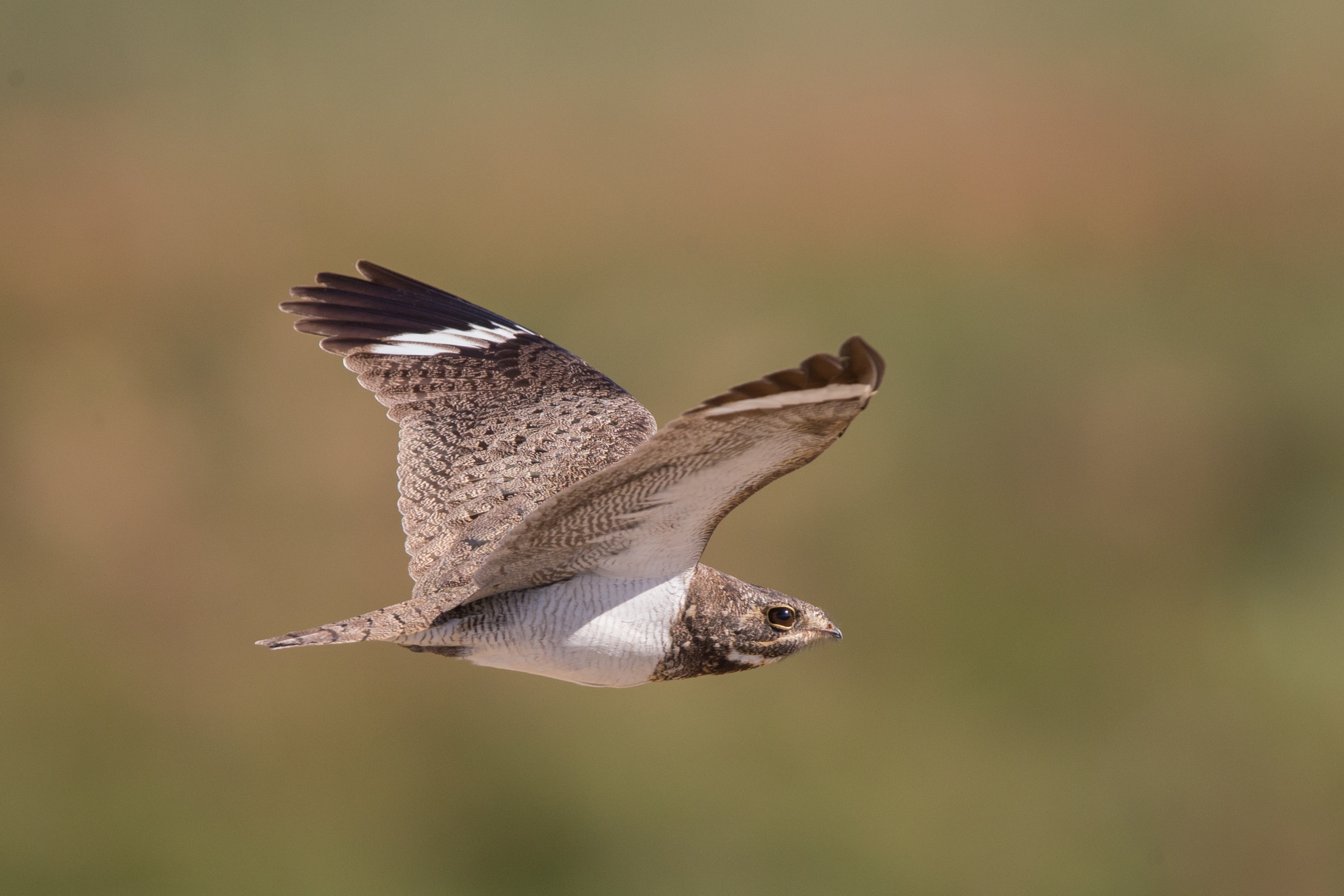
Nacunda nighthawk

Order: Caprimulgiformes Family: Caprimulgidae

- Rufous nightjar (Antrostomus rufus)
- Short-tailed nighthawk (Lurocalis semitorquatus)
- Common pauraque (Nyctidromus albicollis)
- Pygmy nightjar (Nyctipolus hirundinaceus) (EB)
- Little nightjar (Setopagis parvula)
- Band-winged nightjar (Systellura longirostris)
- Scissor-tailed nightjar (Hydropsalis torquata)
- Least nighthawk (Chordeiles pusillus)
- Nacunda nighthawk (Chordeiles nacunda)
- Common nighthawk (Chordeiles minor) (A)
- Lesser nighthawk (Chordeiles acutipennis)

== Swifts ==
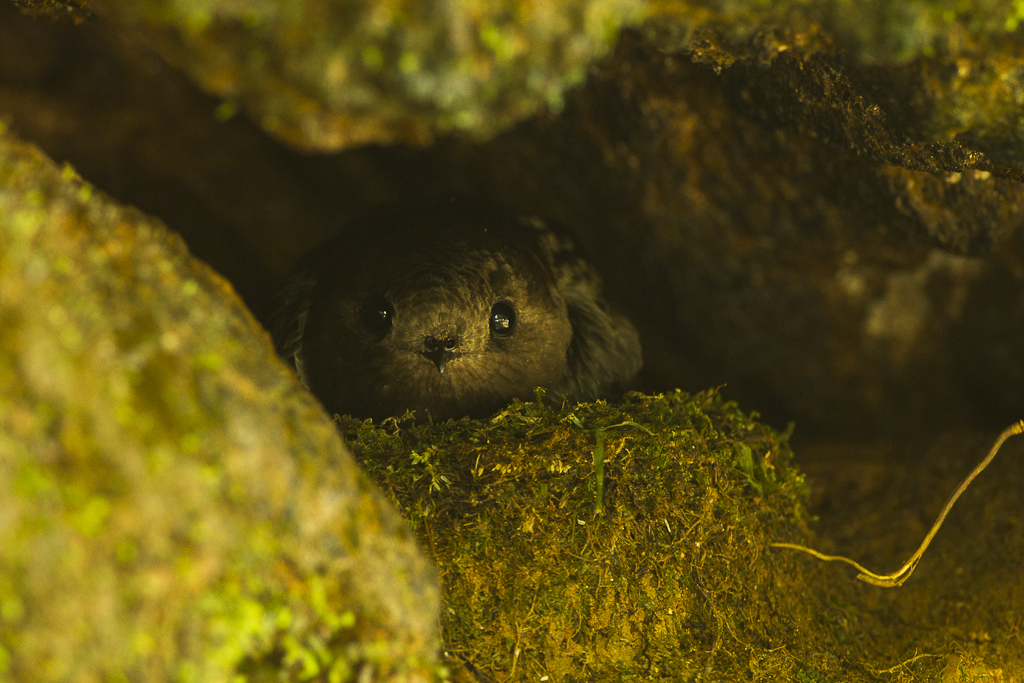
Sooty swift

Order: Apodiformes Family: Apodidae

- Sooty swift (Cypseloides fumigatus)
- Biscutate swift (Streptoprocne biscutata)
- Grey-rumped swift (Chaetura cinereiventris)
- Band-rumped swift (Chaetura spinicaudus) (A)
- Sick's swift (Chaetura meridionalis)
- Fork-tailed palm swift (Tachornis squamata)

== Hummingbirds ==
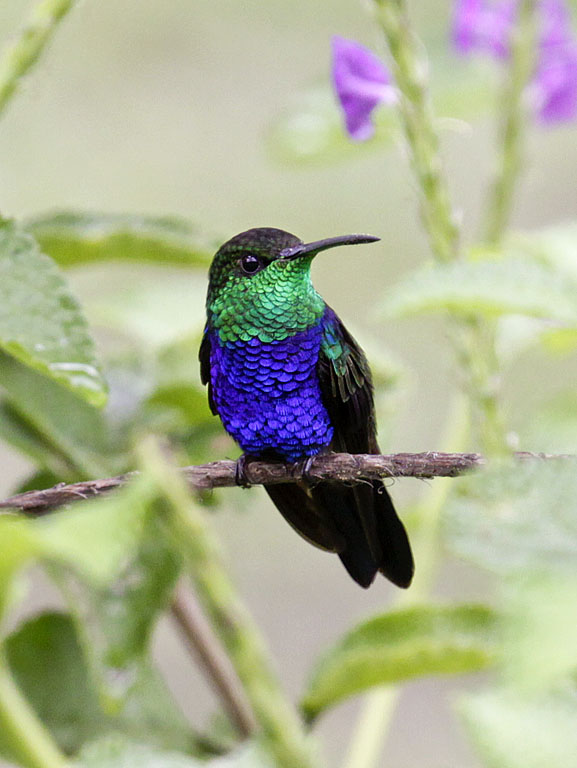
Fork-tailed woodnymph

Order: Apodiformes Family: Trochilidae

- Rufous-breasted hermit (Glaucis hirsutus)
- Broad-tipped hermit (Anopetia gounellei) (EB)
- Reddish hermit (Phaethornis ruber)
- Planalto hermit (Phaethornis pretrei)
- Horned sungem (Heliactin bilophus) (A)
- White-tailed goldenthroat (Polytmus guainumbi)
- Ruby-topaz hummingbird (Chrysolampis mosquitus)
- Black-throated mango (Anthracothorax nigricollis)
- Stripe-breasted starthroat (Heliomaster squamosus) (EB)
- Amethyst woodstar (Calliphlox amethystina)
- Glittering-bellied emerald (Chlorostilbon lucidus)
- Fork-tailed woodnymph (Thalurania furcata)
- Swallow-tailed hummingbird (Eupetomena macroura)
- Versicolored emerald (Chrysuronia versicolor)
- Plain-bellied emerald (Chrysuronia leucogaster)
- Glittering-throated emerald (Chionomesa fimbriata)
- White-chinned sapphire (Chlorestes cyanus)
- Blue-chinned sapphire (Chlorestes notata)

== Cuckoos ==
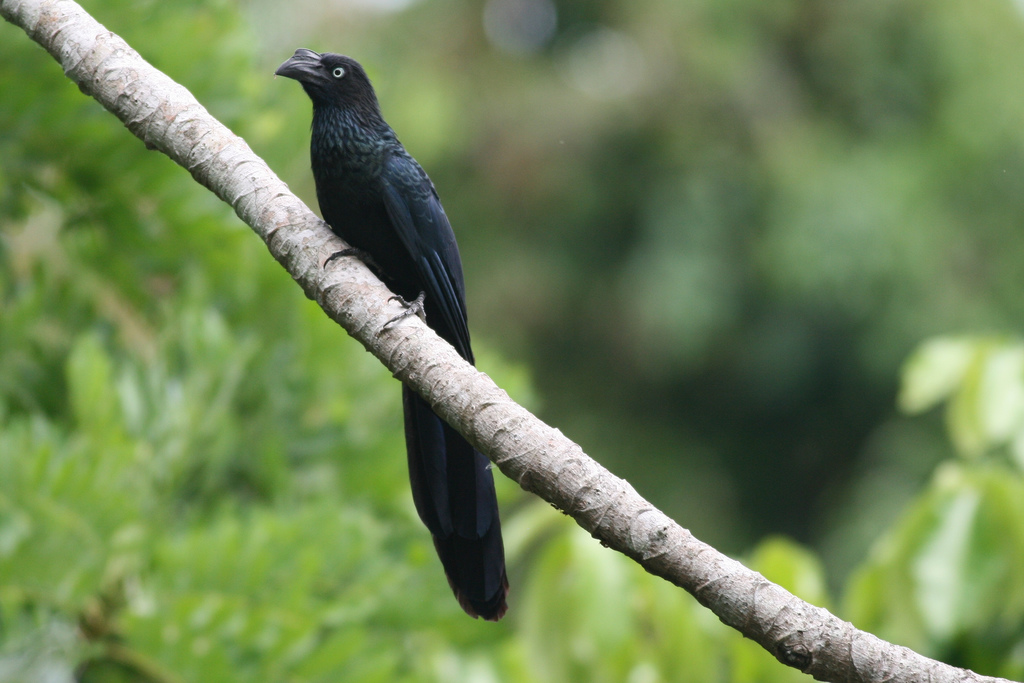
Greater ani

Order: Cuculiformes Family: Cuculidae

- Guira cuckoo (Guira guira)
- Greater ani (Crotophaga major)
- Smooth-billed ani (Crotophaga ani)
- Striped cuckoo (Tapera naevia)
- Pheasant cuckoo (Dromococcyx phasianellus)
- Ash-colored cuckoo (Coccycua cinerea)
- Squirrel cuckoo (Piaya cayana)
- Dark-billed cuckoo (Coccyzus melacoryphus)
- Yellow-billed cuckoo (Coccyzus americanus)
- Pearly-breasted cuckoo (Coccyzus euleri)
- Mangrove cuckoo (Coccyzus minor)

== Limpkins ==
Order: Gruiformes Family: Aramidae

- Limpkin (Aramus guarauna)

== Rails ==
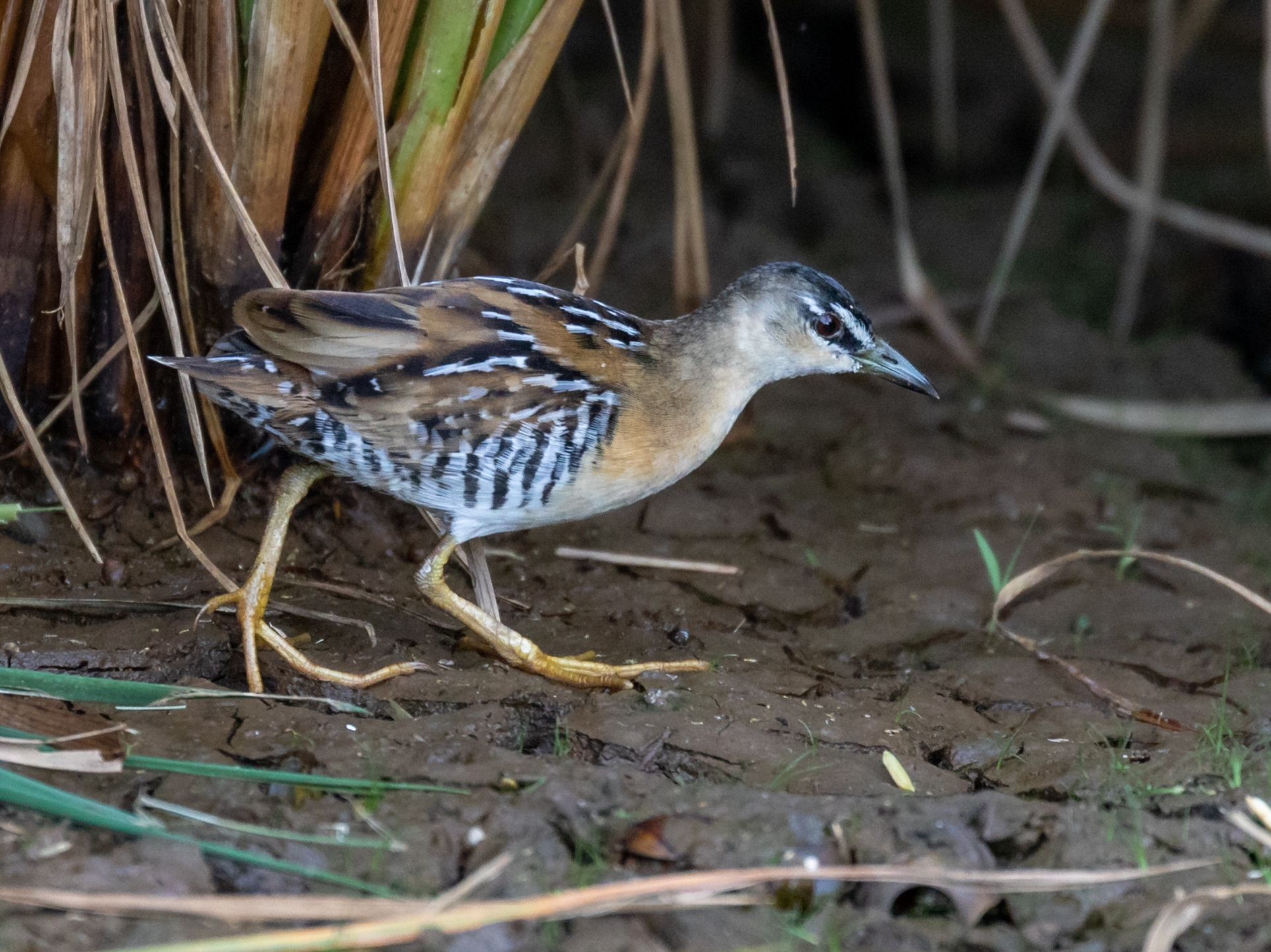
Yellow-breasted crake

Order: Gruiformes Family: Rallidae

- Clapper rail (Rallus longirostris)
- Purple gallinule (Porphyrio martinica)
- Spot-flanked gallinule (Porphyriops melanops)
- Common gallinule (Gallinula galeata)
- Yellow-breasted crake (Laterallus flaviventer)
- Rufous-sided crake (Laterallus melanophaius)
- Grey-breasted crake (Laterallus exilis)
- Ash-throated crake (Mustelirallus albicollis)
- Paint-billed crake (Neocrex erythrops)
- Spotted rail (Pardirallus maculatus)
- Giant wood rail (Aramides ypecaha) (A)
- Little wood rail (Aramides mangle) (EB)
- Grey-necked wood rail (Aramides cajaneus)

== Southern storm petrels ==
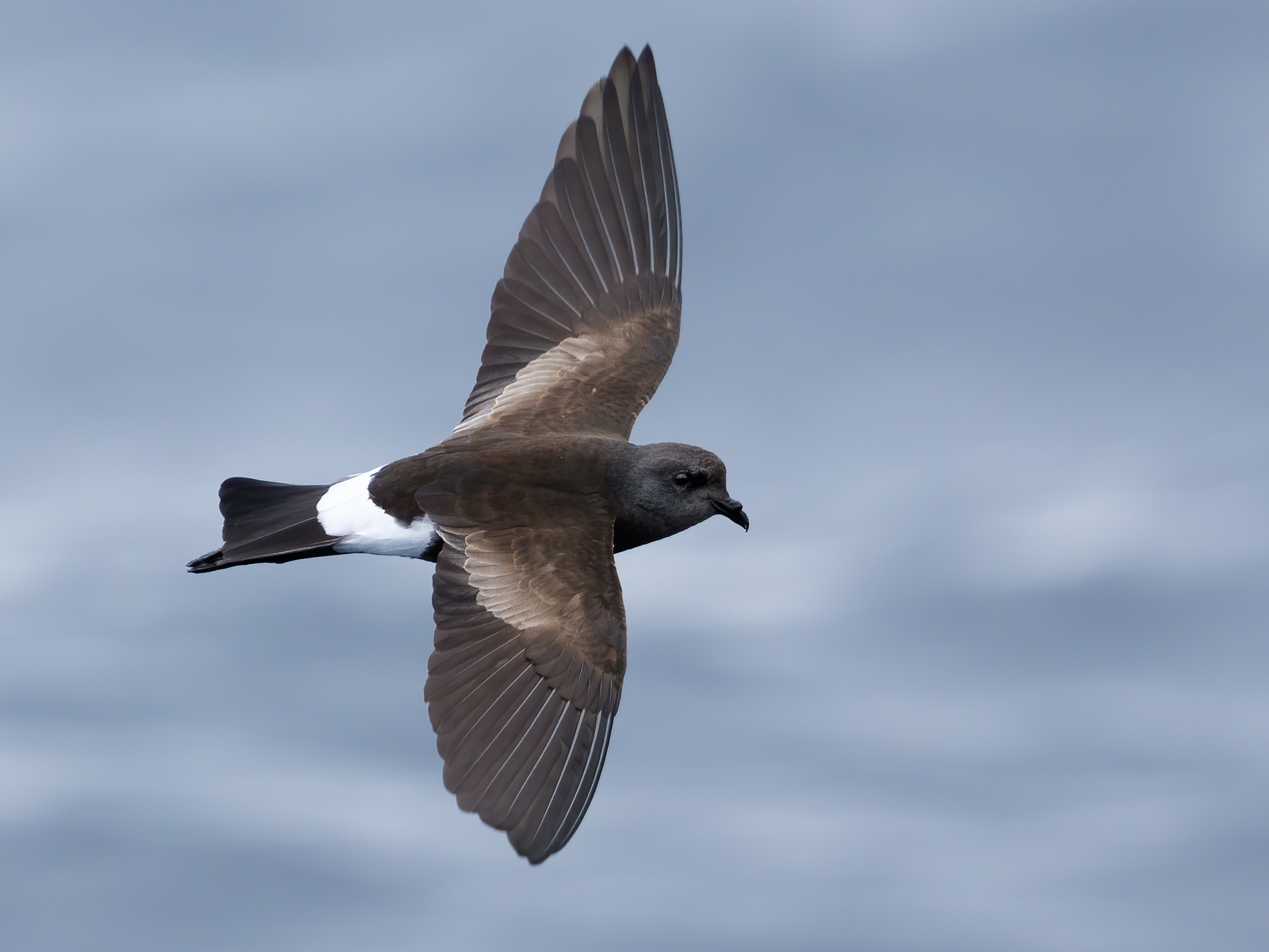
Wilson's storm-petrel

Order: Procellariiformes Family: Oceanitidae

- Wilson's storm-petrel (Oceanites oceanicus)
- Black-bellied storm-petrel (Fregetta tropica) (A)

== Northern storm petrels ==
Order: Procellariiformes Family: Hydrobatidae

- Madeiran storm-petrel (Hydrobates castro) (A)
- Leach's storm-petrel (Hydrobates leucorhous)

== Albatrosses ==
Order: Procellariiformes Family: Diomedeidae

- Atlantic yellow-nosed albatross (Thalassarche chlororhynchos) (A)

== Petrels and shearwaters ==
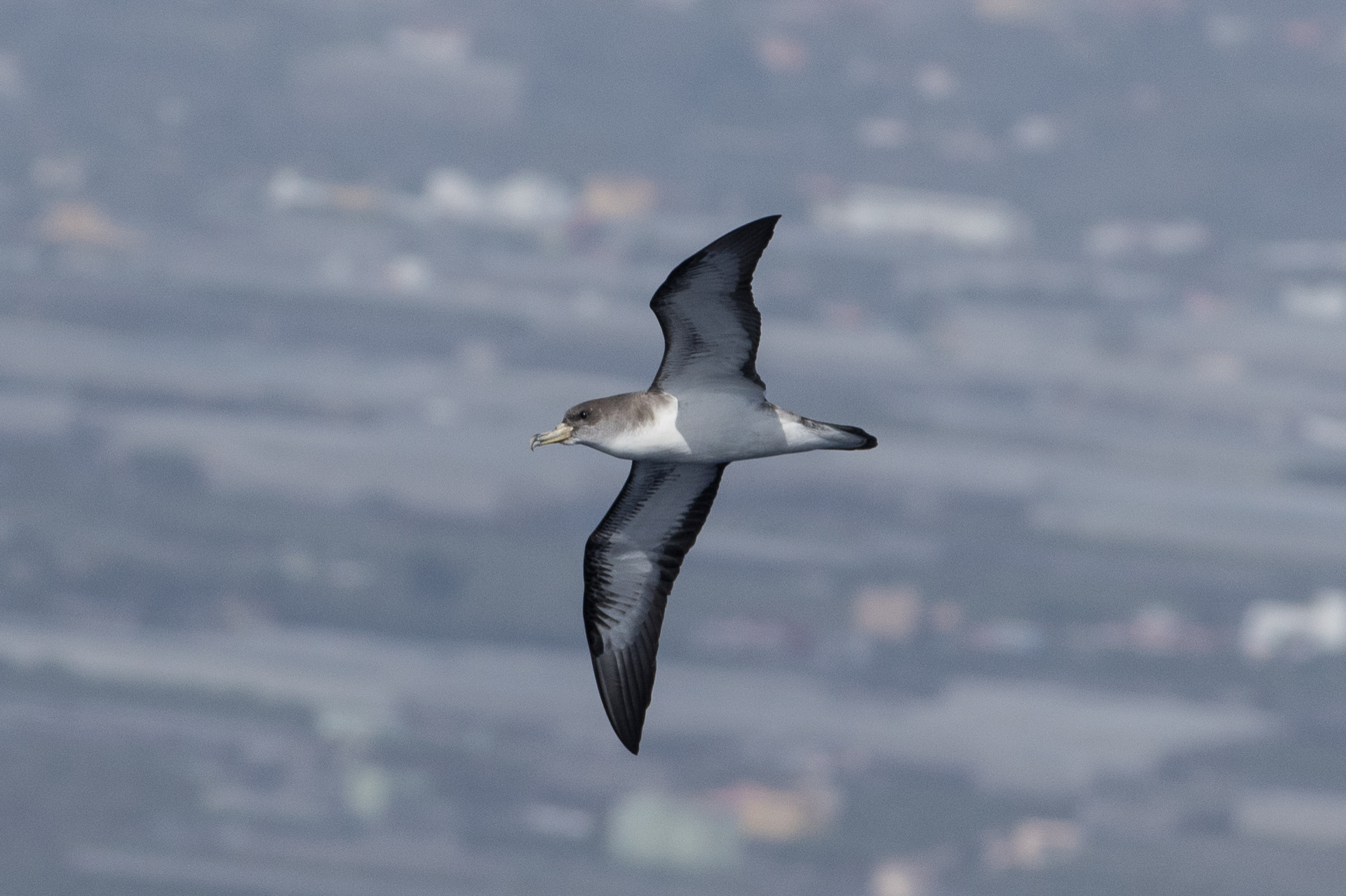
Cory's shearwater

Order: Procellariiformes Family: Procellariidae

- Herald petrel (Pterodroma arminjoniana) (A)
- Cory's shearwater (Calonectris borealis)
- Sooty shearwater (Ardenna grisea)
- Great shearwater (Ardenna gravis)
- Manx shearwater (Puffinus puffinus)

== Storks ==
Order: Pelecaniformes Family: Ciconiidae

- Maguari stork (Ciconia maguari)
- Jabiru (Jabiru mycteria)
- Wood stork (Mycteria americana)

== Herons and egrets ==
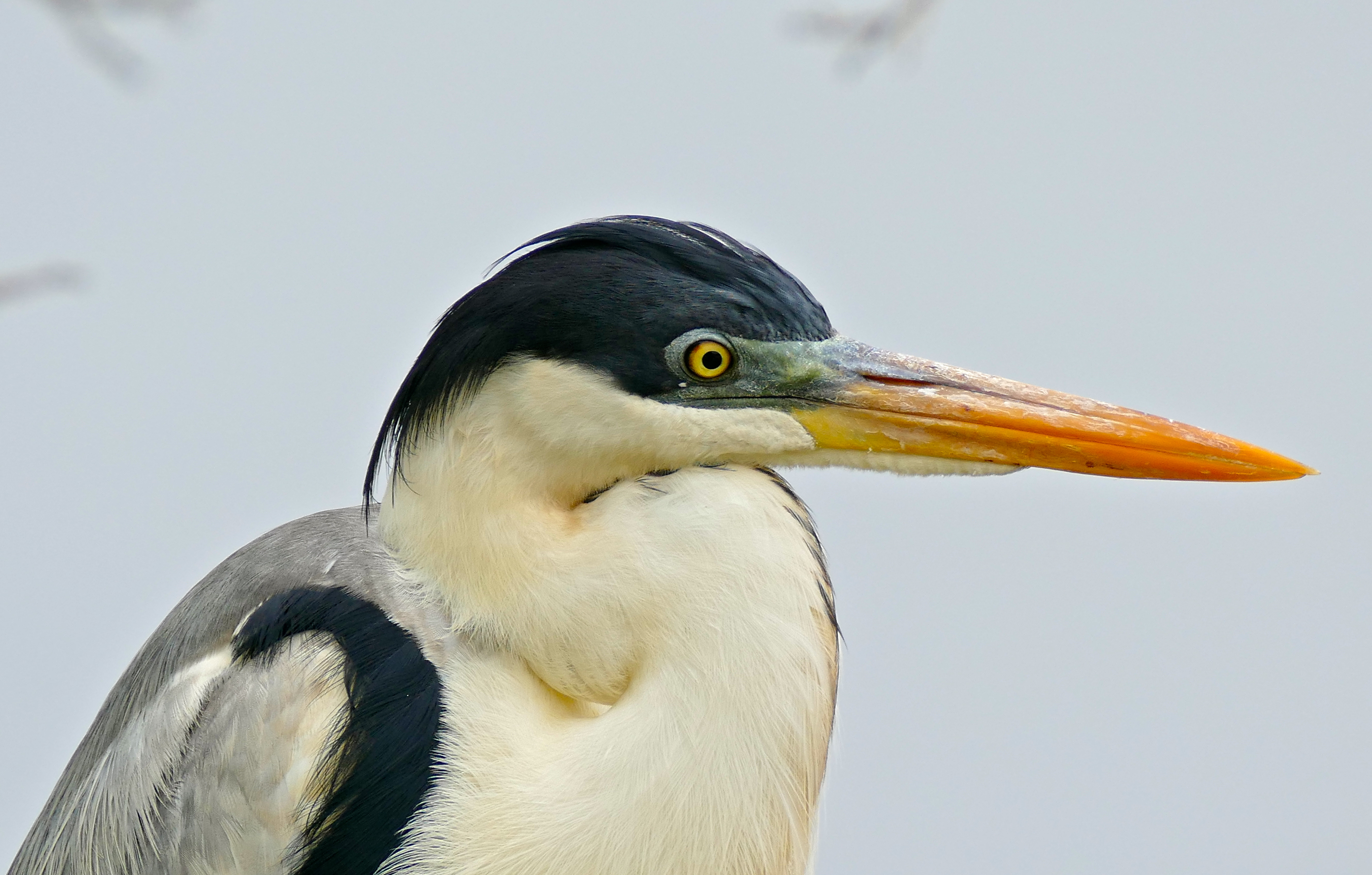
Cocoi heron

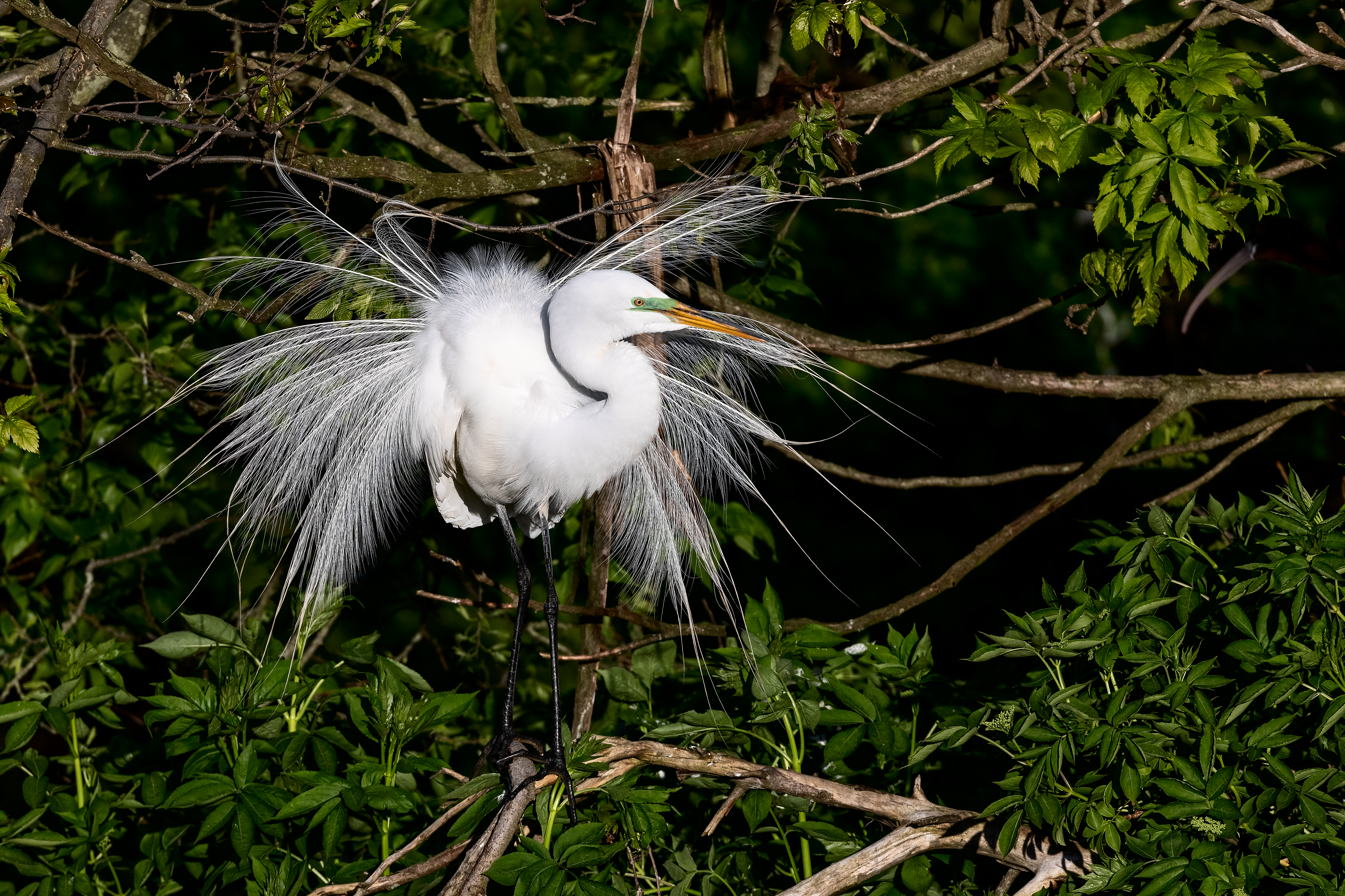
Great egret

Order: Pelecaniformes Family: Ardeidae

- Rufescent tiger heron (Tigrisoma lineatum)
- Pinnated bittern (Botaurus pinnatus)
- Least bittern (Ixobrychus exilis)
- Black-crowned night heron (Nycticorax nycticorax)
- Yellow-crowned night heron (Nyctanassa violacea)
- Striated heron (Butorides striata)
- Squacco heron (Ardeola ralloides) (A)
- Western cattle egret (Ardea ibis)
- Cocoi heron (Ardea cocoi)
- Great egret (Ardea alba)
- Capped heron (Pilherodius pileatus)
- Tricoloured heron (Egretta tricolor)
- Western reef heron (Egretta gularis) (A)
- Snowy egret (Egretta thula)
- Little blue heron (Egretta caerulea)

== Ibises and spoonbills ==
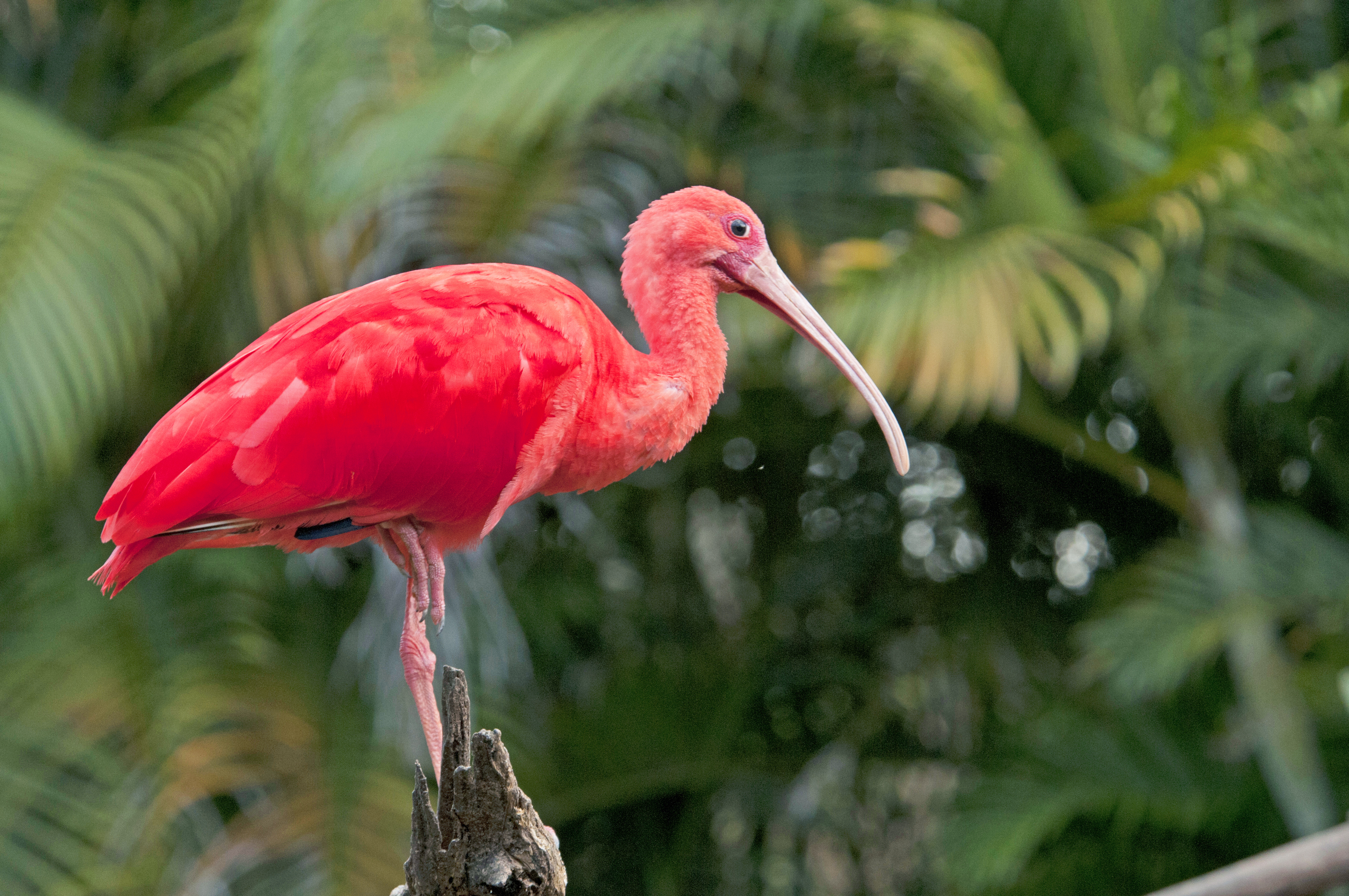
Scarlet ibis

Order: Pelecaniformes Family: Threskiornithidae

- Roseate spoonbill (Platalea ajaja)
- Scarlet ibis (Eudocimus ruber)
- Bare-faced ibis (Phimosus infuscatus)
- Buff-necked ibis (Theristicus caudatus)

== Frigatebirds ==
Order: Pelecaniformes Family: Fregatidae

- Magnificent frigatebird (Fregata magnificens)

== Boobies and gannets ==
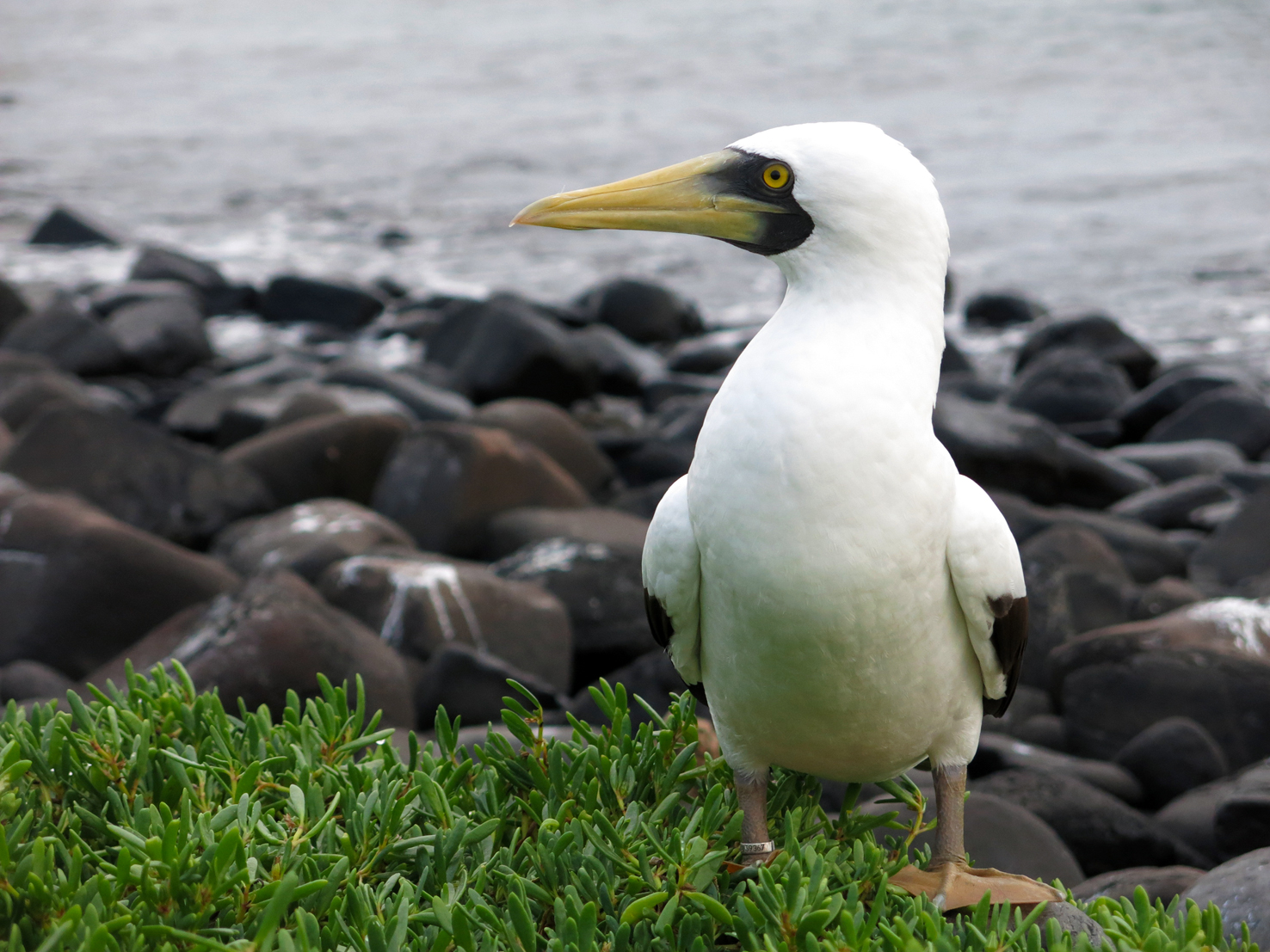
Masked booby

Order: Pelecaniformes Family: Sulidae

- Northern gannet (Morus bassanus) (A)
- Masked booby (Sula dactylatra)
- Red-footed booby (Sula sula)
- Brown booby (Sula leucogaster)

== Cormorants ==
Order: Pelecaniformes Family: Phalacrocoracidae

- Neotropic cormorant (Phalacrocorax brasilianus)

== Anhingas ==
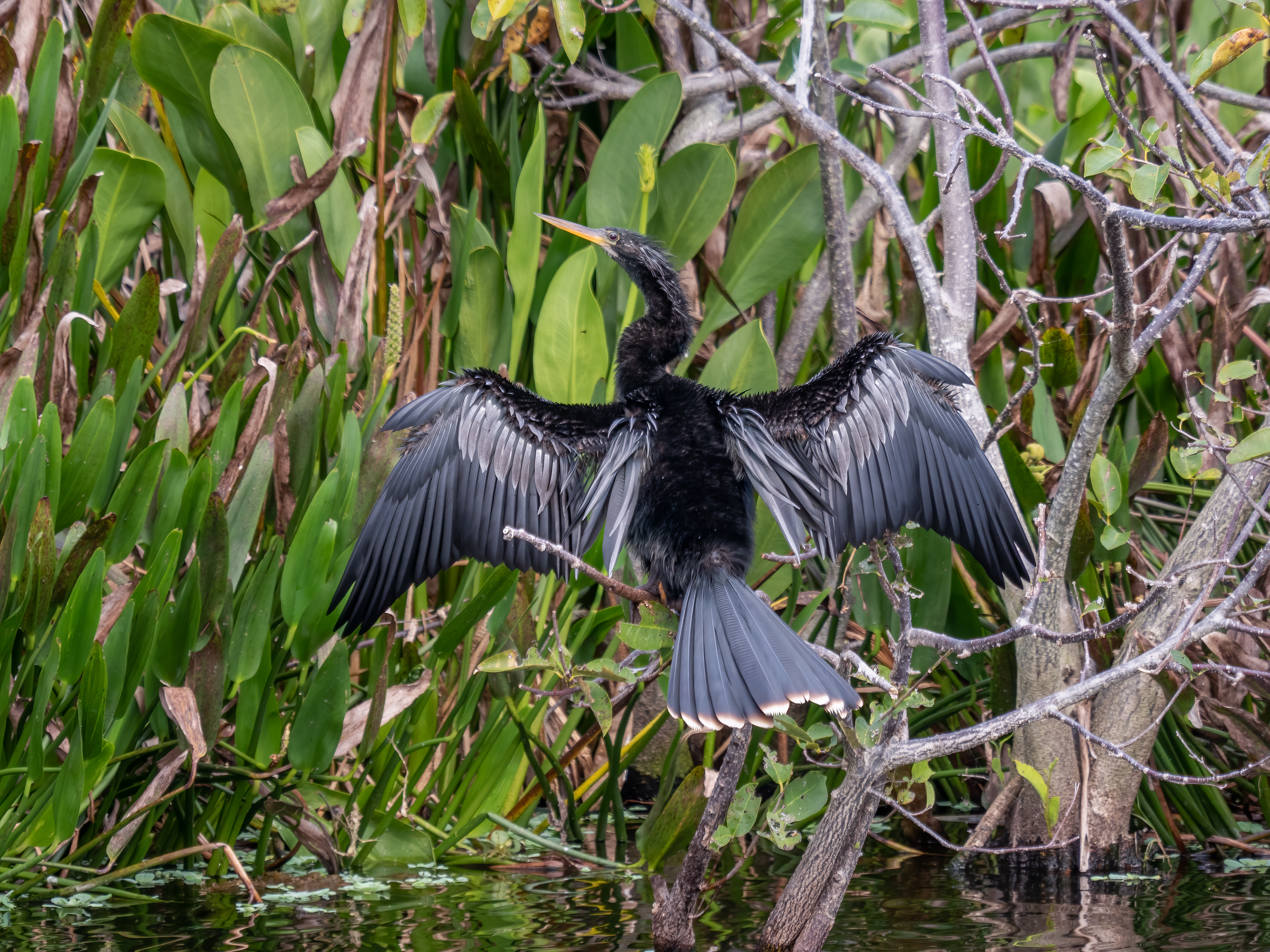
Anhinga

Order: Pelecaniformes Family: Anhingidae

- Anhinga (Anhinga anhinga)

== Stone curlews and thick-knees ==
Order: Charadriiformes Family: Burhinidae

- Double-striped thick-knee (Burhinus bistriatus) (A)

== Oystercatchers ==
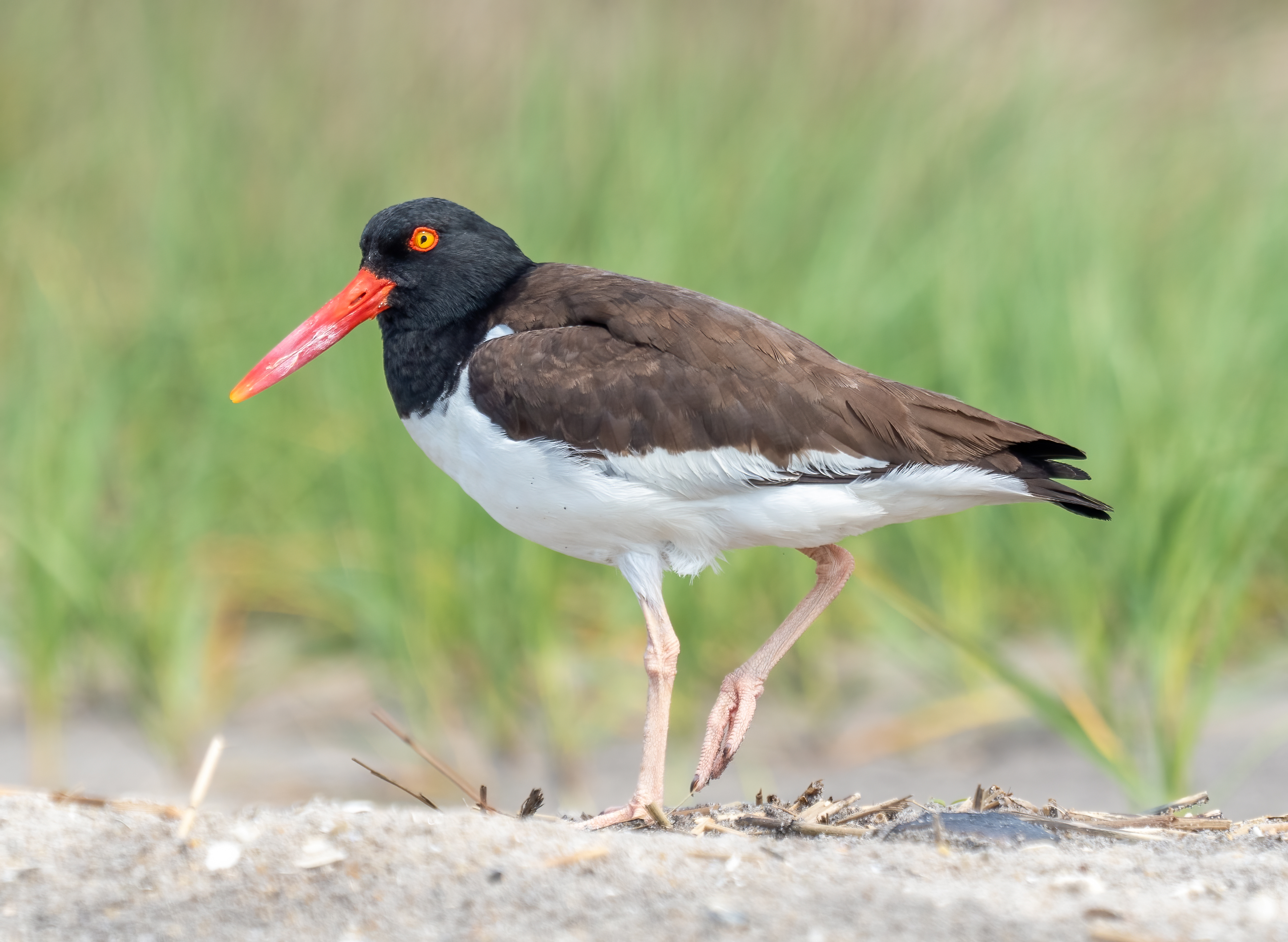
American oystercatcher

Order: Charadriiformes Family: Haematopodidae

- American oystercatcher (Haematopus palliatus)

== Stilts and avocets ==
Order: Charadriiformes Family: Recurvirostridae

- Black-necked stilt (Himantopus mexicanus)

== Plovers and lapwings ==
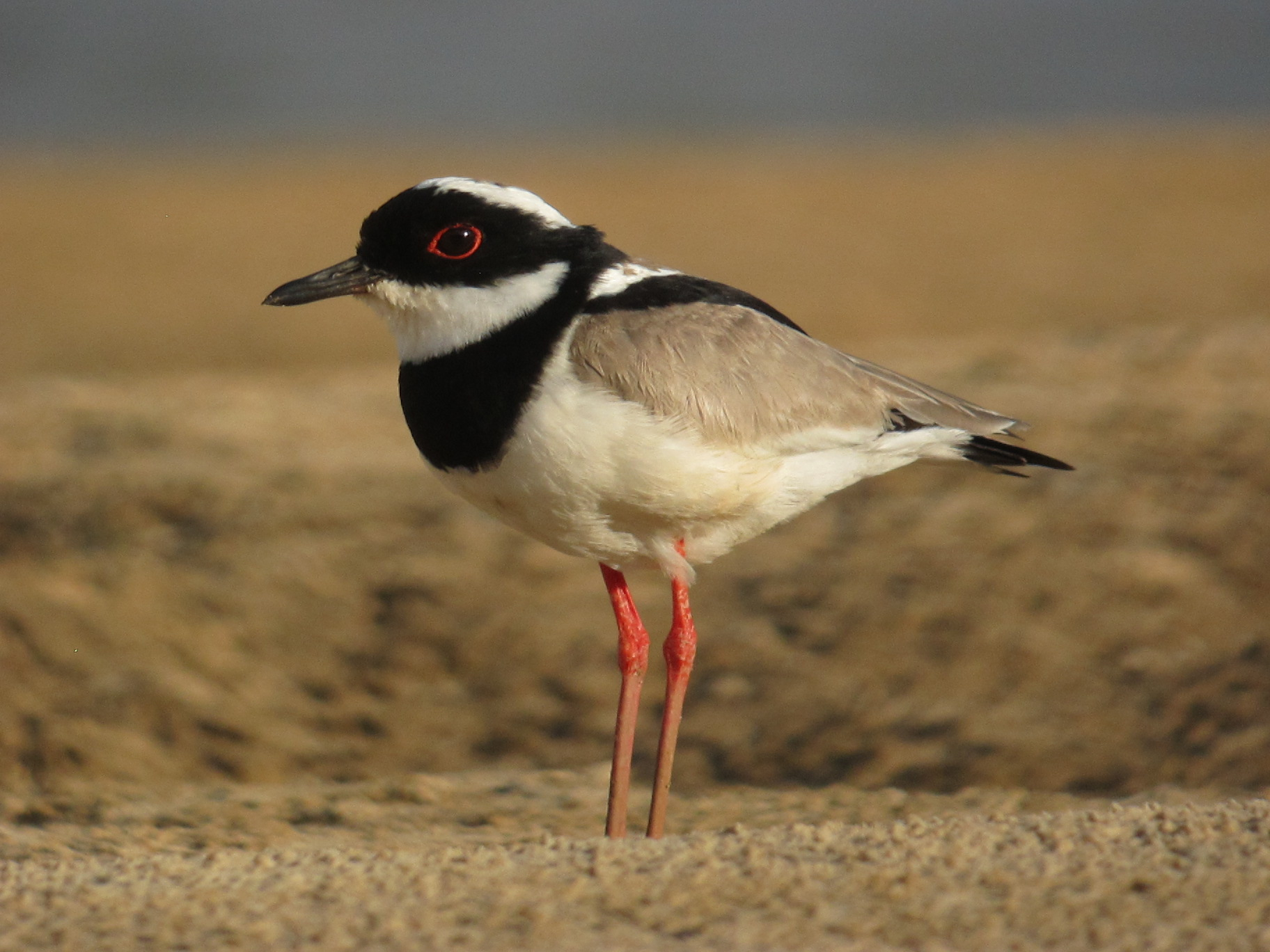
Pied lapwing

Order: Charadriiformes Family: Charadriidae

- American golden plover (Pluvialis dominica)
- Black-bellied plover (Pluvialis squatarola)
- Pied lapwing (Vanellus cayanus)
- Southern lapwing (Vanellus chilensis)
- Semipalmated plover (Charadrius semipalmatus)
- Wilson's plover (Charadrius wilsonia)
- Collared plover (Charadrius collaris)

== Jacanas ==
Order: Charadriiformes Family: Jacanidae

- Wattled jacana (Jacana jacana)

== Sandpipers ==
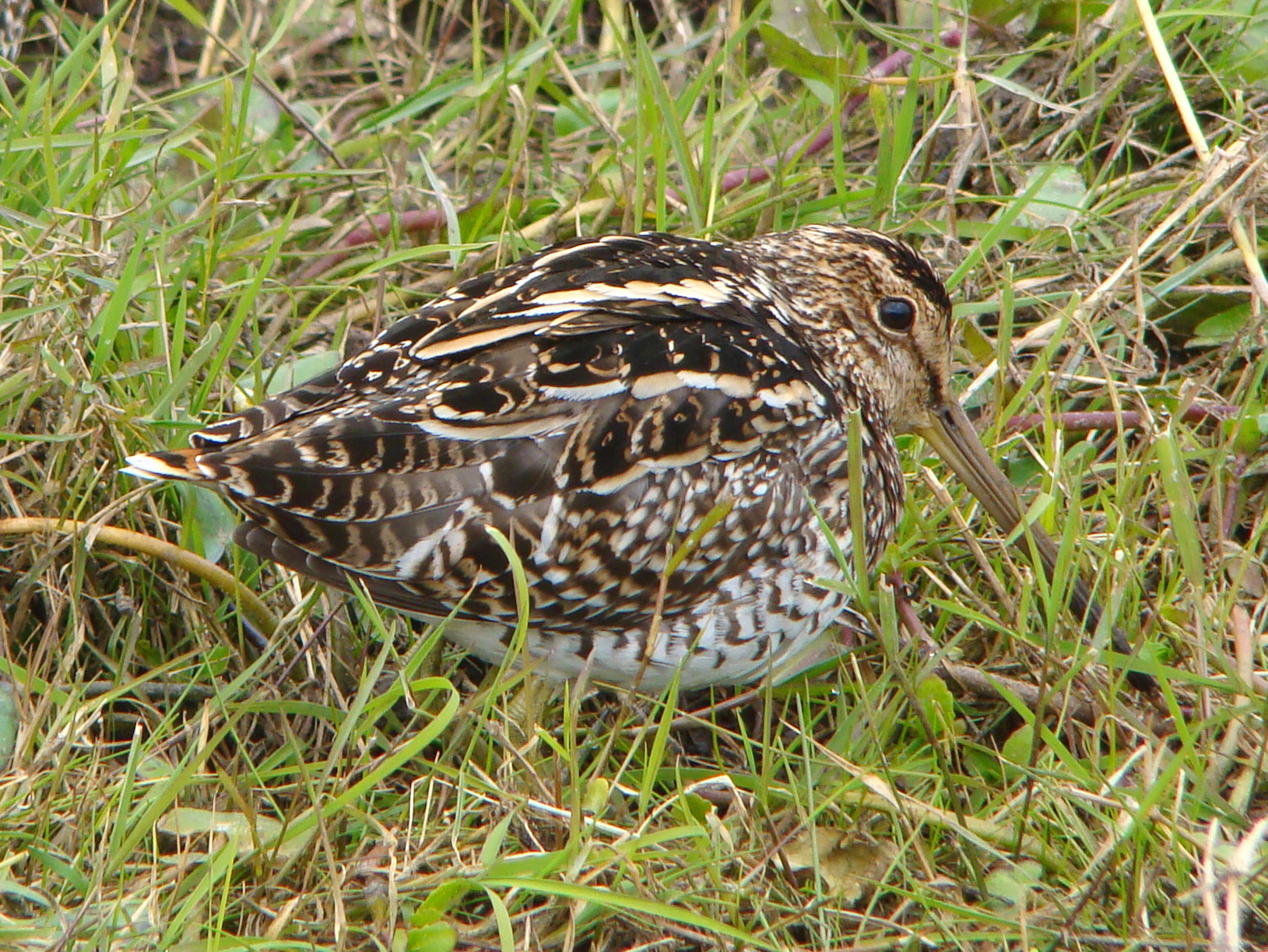
Pantanal snipe

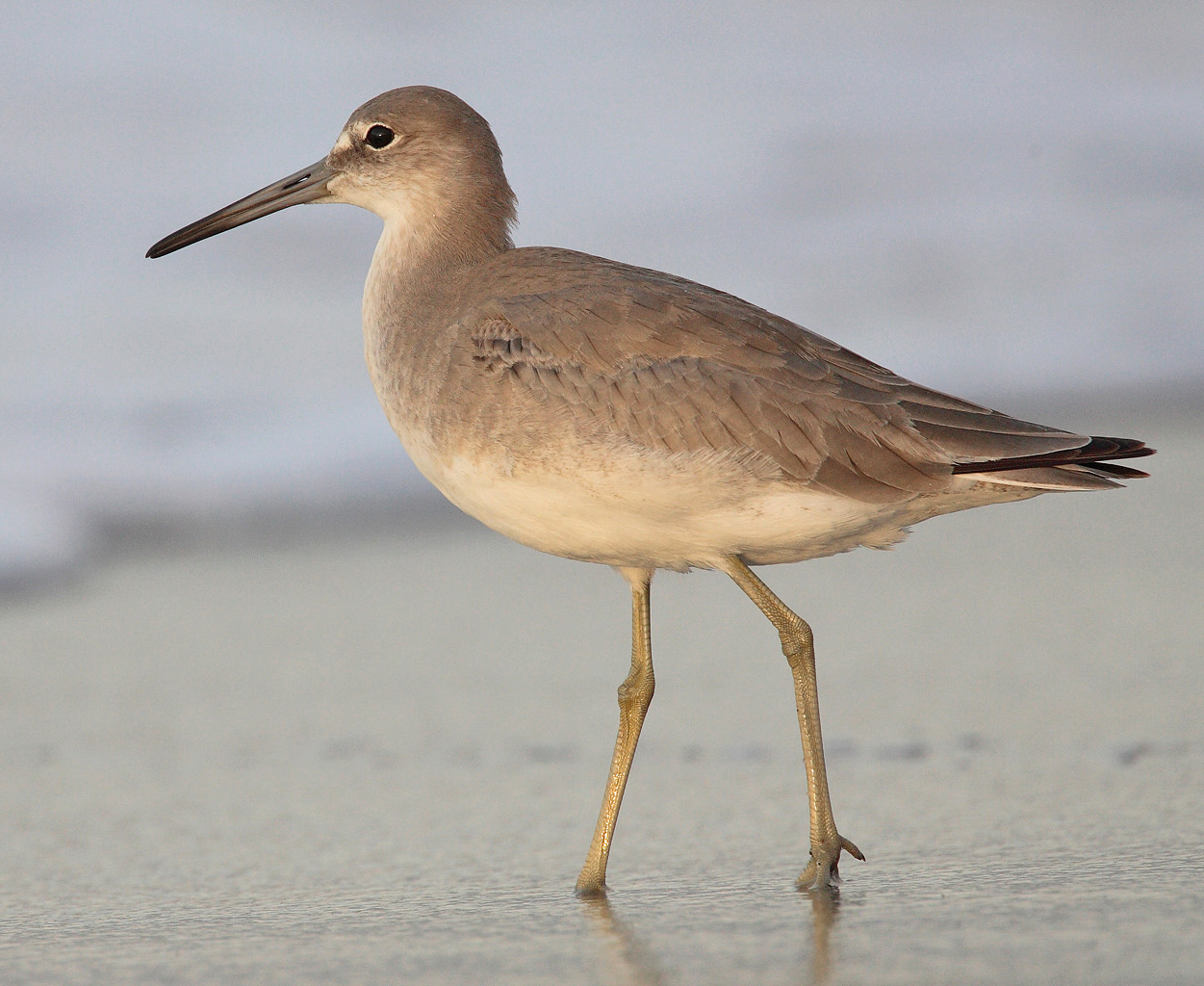
Willet

Order: Charadriiformes Family: Scolopacidae

- Whimbrel (Numenius phaeopus)
- Bar-tailed godwit (Limosa lapponica) (A)
- Marbled godwit (Limosa fedoa) (A)
- Ruddy turnstone (Arenaria interpres)
- Red knot (Calidris canutus)
- Stilt sandpiper (Calidris himantopus)
- Sanderling (Calidris alba)
- Least sandpiper (Calidris minutilla)
- White-rumped sandpiper (Calidris fuscicollis)
- Pectoral sandpiper (Calidris melanotos)
- Semipalmated sandpiper (Calidris pusilla)
- Western sandpiper (Calidris mauri)
- Short-billed dowitcher (Limnodromus griseus)
- Pantanal snipe (Gallinago paraguaiae)
- Spotted sandpiper (Actitis macularius)
- Solitary sandpiper (Tringa solitaria)
- Greater yellowlegs (Tringa melanoleuca)
- Lesser yellowlegs (Tringa flavipes)
- Willet (Tringa semipalmata)

== Pratincoles ==
Order: Charadriiformes Family: Glareolidae

- Collared pratincole (Glareola pratincola) (A)

== Skuas and jaegers ==
Order: Charadriiformes Family: Stercorariidae

- South polar skua (Stercorarius maccormicki)
- Pomarine jaeger (Stercorarius pomarinus)
- Parasitic jaeger (Stercorarius parasiticus)
- Long-tailed jaeger (Stercorarius longicaudus)

== Gulls, terns, and skimmers ==
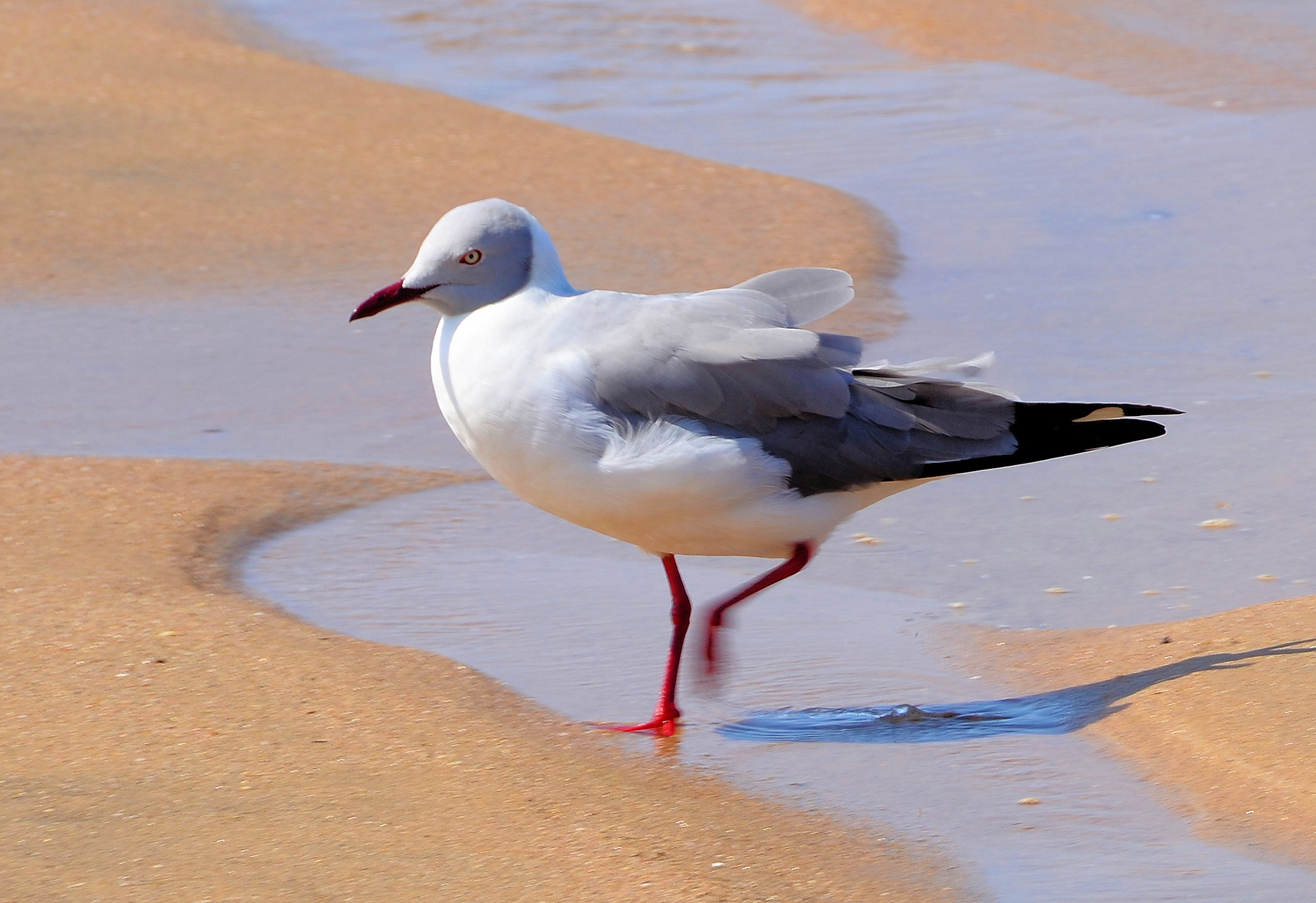
Grey-hooded gull

Order: Charadriiformes Family: Laridae

- Grey-hooded gull (Chroicocephalus cirrocephalus)
- Laughing gull (Leucophaeus atricilla)
- Kelp gull (Larus dominicanus)
- Lesser black-backed gull (Larus fuscus) (A)
- Brown noddy (Anous stolidus)
- Black noddy (Anous minutus)
- Black skimmer (Rynchops niger)
- Least tern (Sternula antillarum)
- Yellow-billed tern (Sternula superciliaris)
- Large-billed tern (Phaetusa simplex)
- Gull-billed tern (Gelochelidon nilotica)
- Black tern (Chlidonias niger)
- Common tern (Sterna hirundo)
- Roseate tern (Sterna dougallii)
- Arctic tern (Sterna paradisaea)
- Sandwich tern (Thalasseus sandvicensis)
- Royal tern (Thalasseus maximus)

== New World vultures ==
Order: Cathartiformes Family: Cathartidae

- Turkey vulture (Cathartes aura)
- Lesser yellow-headed vulture (Cathartes burrovianus)
- King vulture (Sarcoramphus papa)
- Black vulture (Coragyps atratus)

== Ospreys ==
Order: Accipitriformes Family: Pandionidae

- Osprey (Pandion haliaetus)

== Hawks, kites, and eagles ==
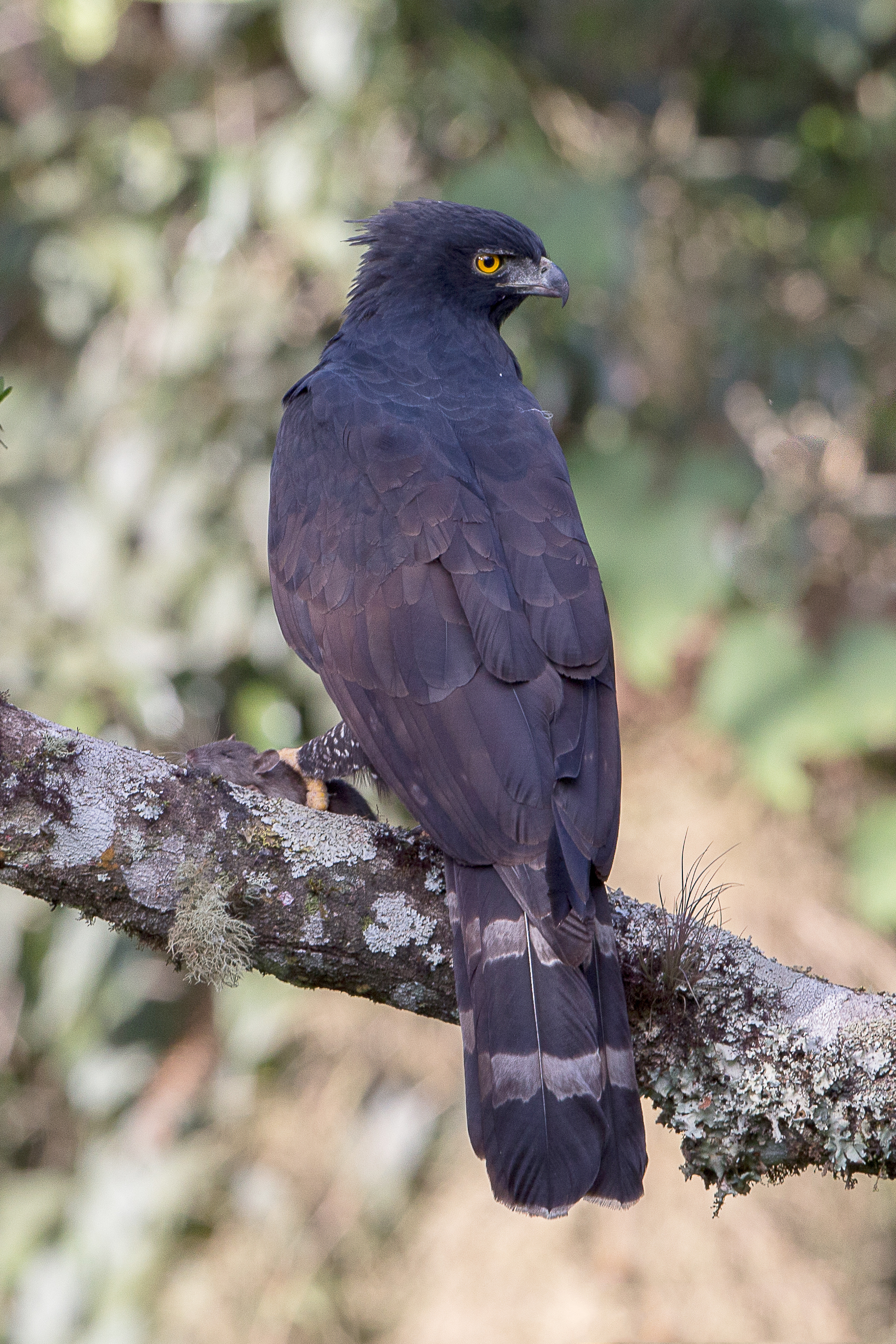
Black hawk eagle

Order: Accipitriformes Family: Accipitridae

- White-tailed kite (Elanus leucurus)
- Pearl kite (Gampsonyx swainsonii)
- Hook-billed kite (Chondrohierax uncinatus)
- Grey-headed kite (Leptodon cayanensis)
- Swallow-tailed kite (Elanoides forficatus) (A)
- Snail kite (Rostrhamus sociabilis)
- Rufous-thighed kite (Harpagus diodon)
- Plumbeous kite (Ictinia plumbea) (A)
- Sharp-shinned hawk (Accipiter striatus)
- Bicoloured hawk (Astur bicolor)
- Crane hawk (Geranospiza caerulescens)
- Savanna hawk (Buteogallus meridionalis)
- Great black hawk (Buteogallus urubitinga)
- Roadside hawk (Rupornis magnirostris)
- Harris's hawk (Parabuteo unicinctus)
- White-tailed hawk (Geranoaetus albicaudatus)
- Black-chested buzzard-eagle (Geranoaetus melanoleucus)
- Black hawk eagle (Spizaetus tyrannus)
- Grey-lined hawk (Buteo nitidus)
- Broad-winged hawk (Buteo platypterus)
- Short-tailed hawk (Buteo brachyurus)
- Zone-tailed hawk (Buteo albonotatus)

== Barn owls ==
Order: Strigiformes Family: Tytonidae

- American barn owl (Tyto furcata)

== Owls ==
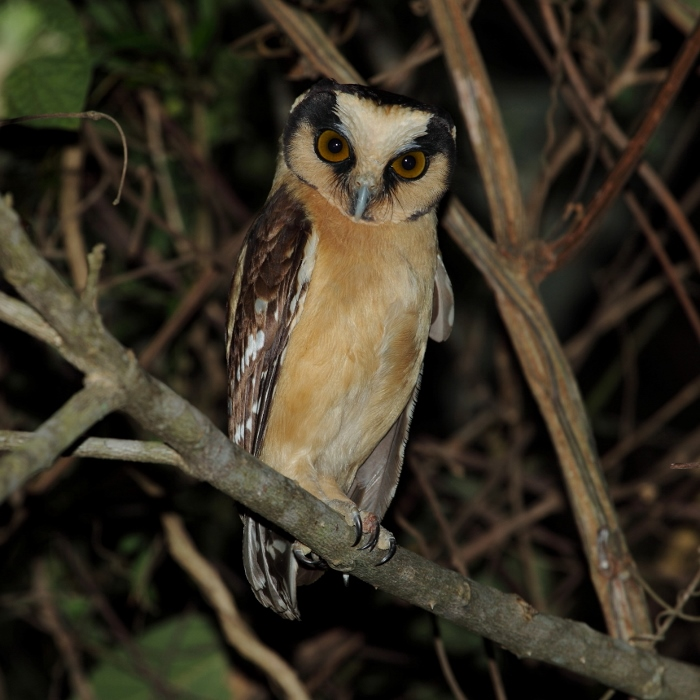
Buff-fronted owl

Order: Strigiformes Family: Strigidae

- Tropical screech owl (Megascops choliba)
- Spectacled owl (Pulsatrix perspicillata)
- Ferruginous pygmy owl (Glaucidium brasilianum)
- Burrowing owl (Athene cunicularia)
- Buff-fronted owl (Aegolius harrisii)
- Striped owl (Asio clamator)

== Trogons ==
Order: Trogoniformes Family: Trogonidae

- Blue-crowned trogon (Trogon curucui)

== Jacamars ==
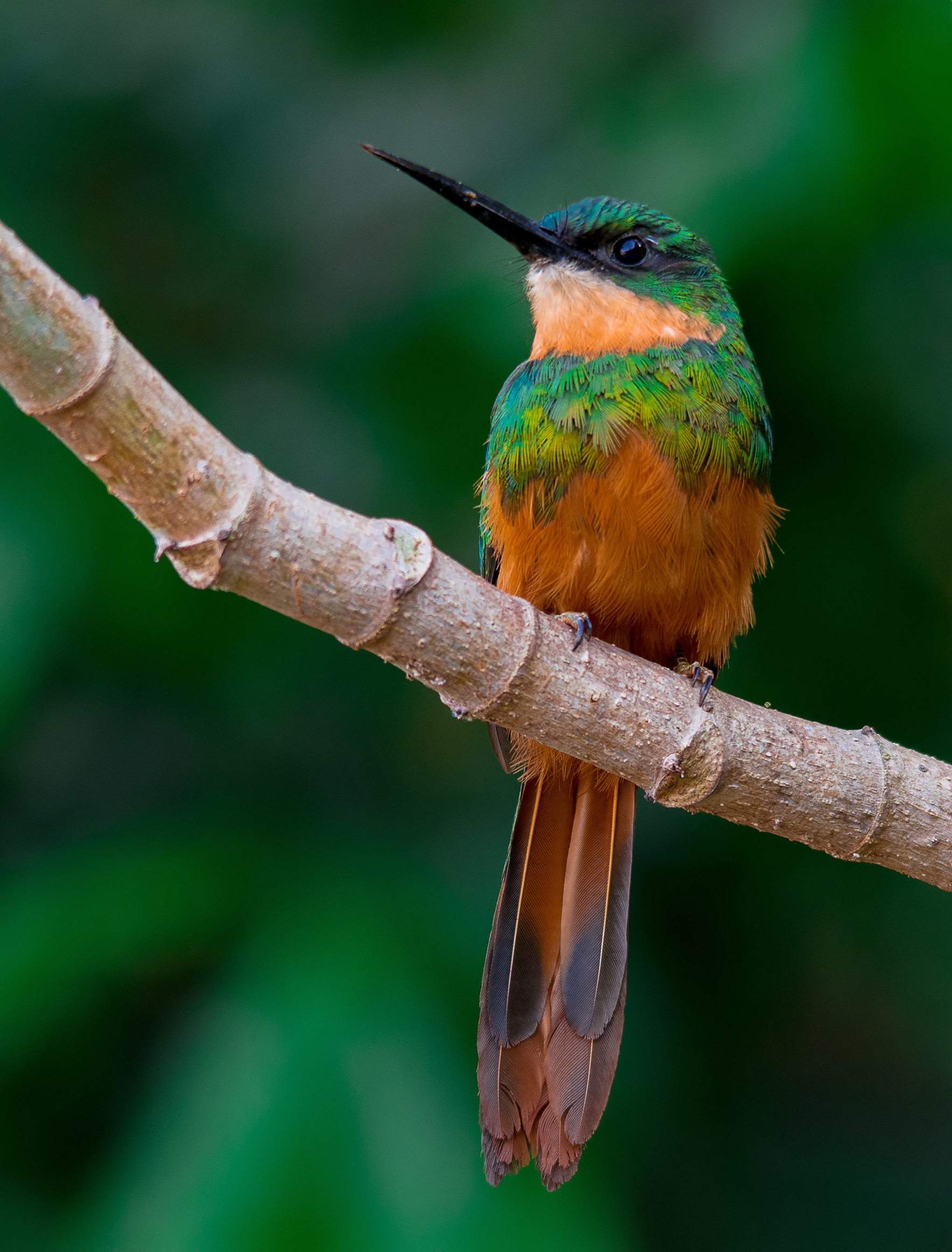
Rufous-tailed jacamar

Order: Piciformes Family: Galbulidae

- Rufous-tailed jacamar (Galbula ruficauda)

== Puffbirds ==
Order: Piciformes Family: Bucconidae

- Spot-backed puffbird (Nystalus maculatus)

== Woodpeckers and piculets ==
Order: Piciformes Family: Picidae

- Ochraceous piculet (Picumnus limae) (EB)
- Spotted piculet (Picumnus pygmaeus) (EB)
- White woodpecker (Melanerpes candidus)
- Little woodpecker (Dryobates passerinus)
- Crimson-crested woodpecker (Campephilus melanoleucos)
- Ochre-backed woodpecker (Celeus ochraceus) (EB)
- Golden-green woodpecker (Piculus chrysochloros)
- Green-barred woodpecker (Colaptes melanochloros)
- Campo flicker (Colaptes campestris)

== Toucans ==
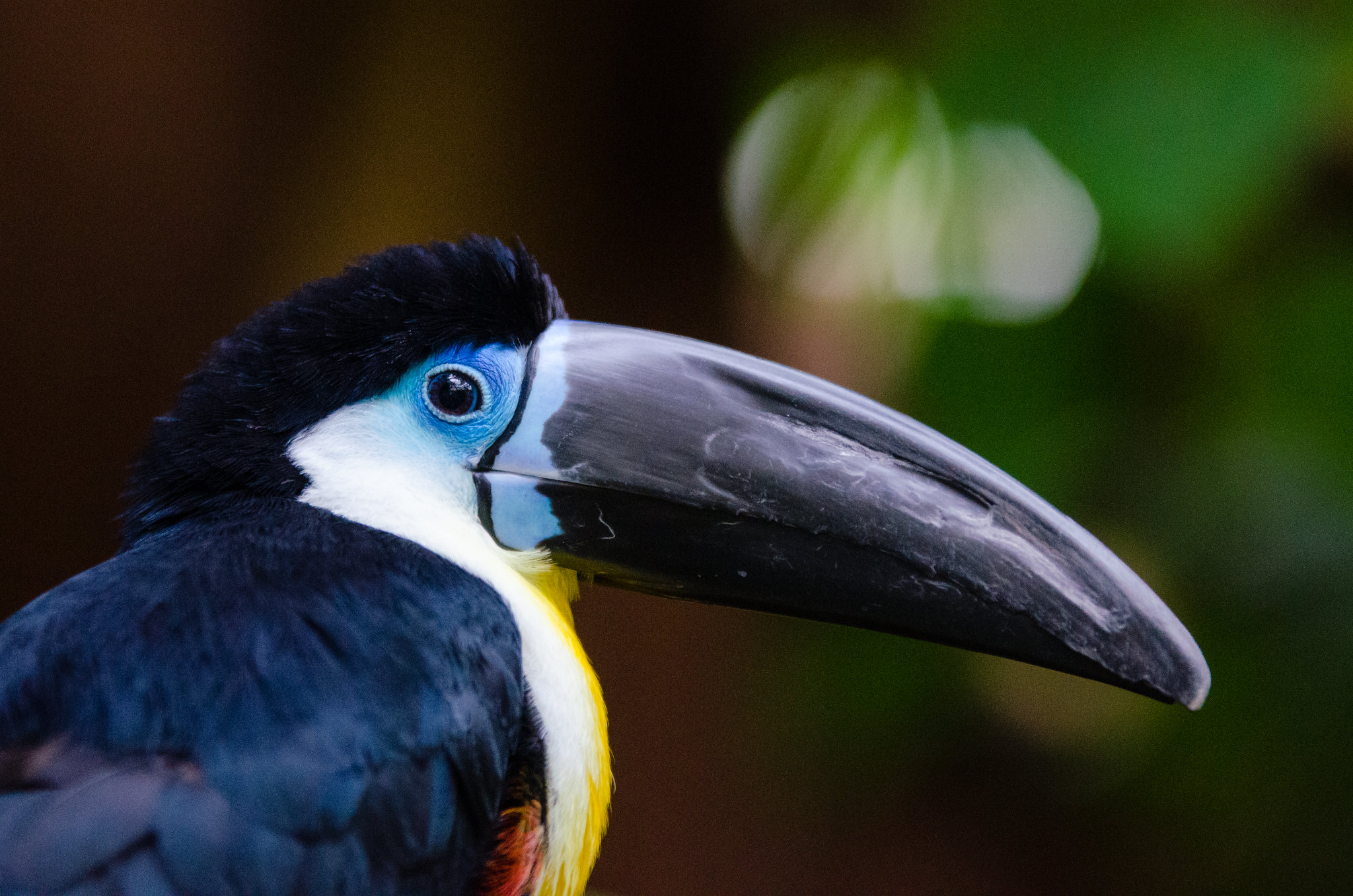
Channel-billed toucan

Order: Piciformes Family: Ramphastidae

- Channel-billed toucan (Ramphastos vitellinus)
- Gould's toucanet (Selenidera gouldii)
- Toco toucan (Ramphastos toco) (A)

== Motmots ==
Order: Coraciiformes Family: Momotidae

- Amazonian motmot (Momotus momota)

== Kingfishers ==
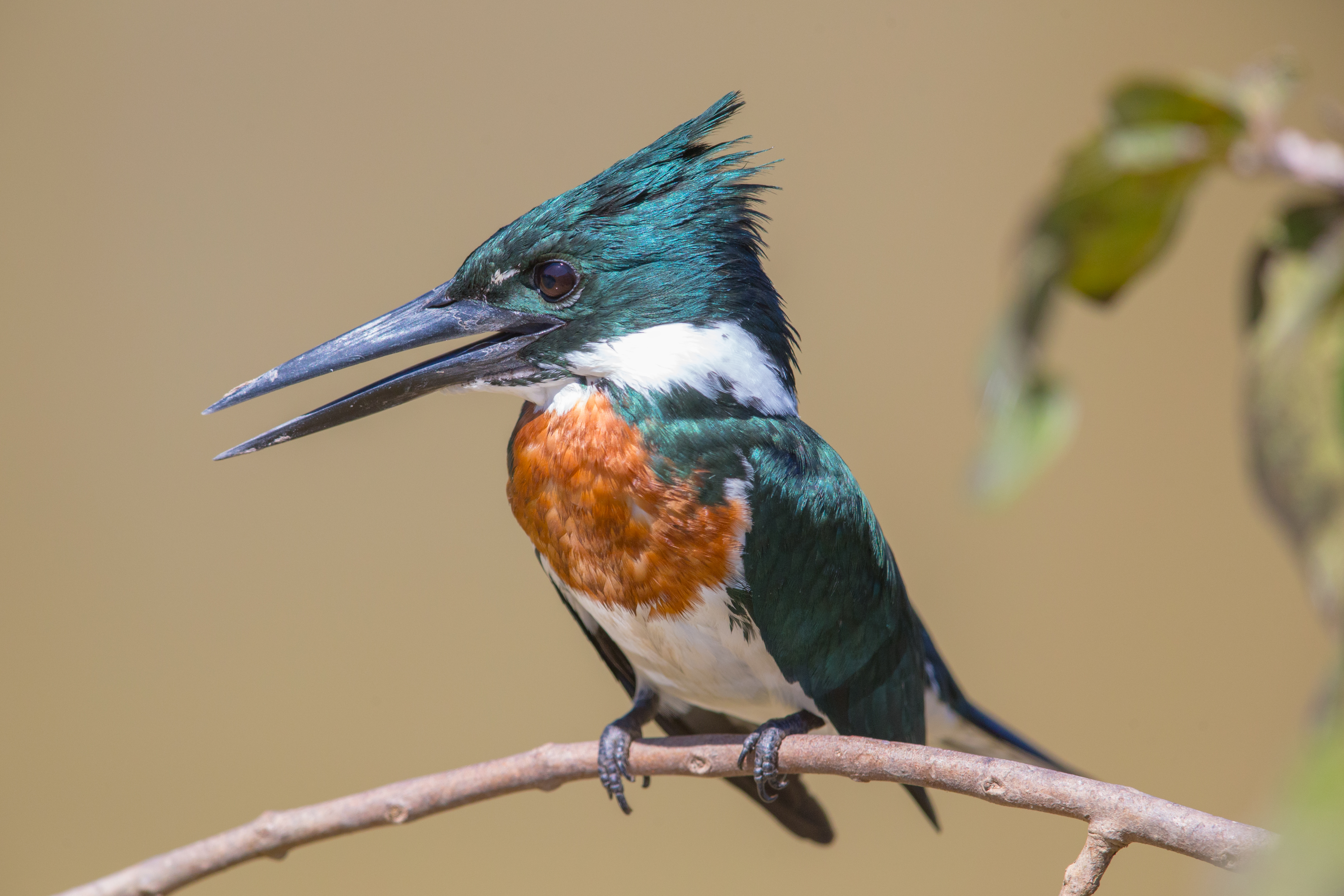
Amazon kingfisher

Order: Coraciiformes Family: Alcedinidae

- Ringed kingfisher (Megaceryle torquata)
- Amazon kingfisher (Chloroceryle amazona)
- Green kingfisher (Chloroceryle americana)

== Seriemas ==
Order: Cariamiformes Family: Cariamidae

- Red-legged seriema (Cariama cristata)

== Falcons ==
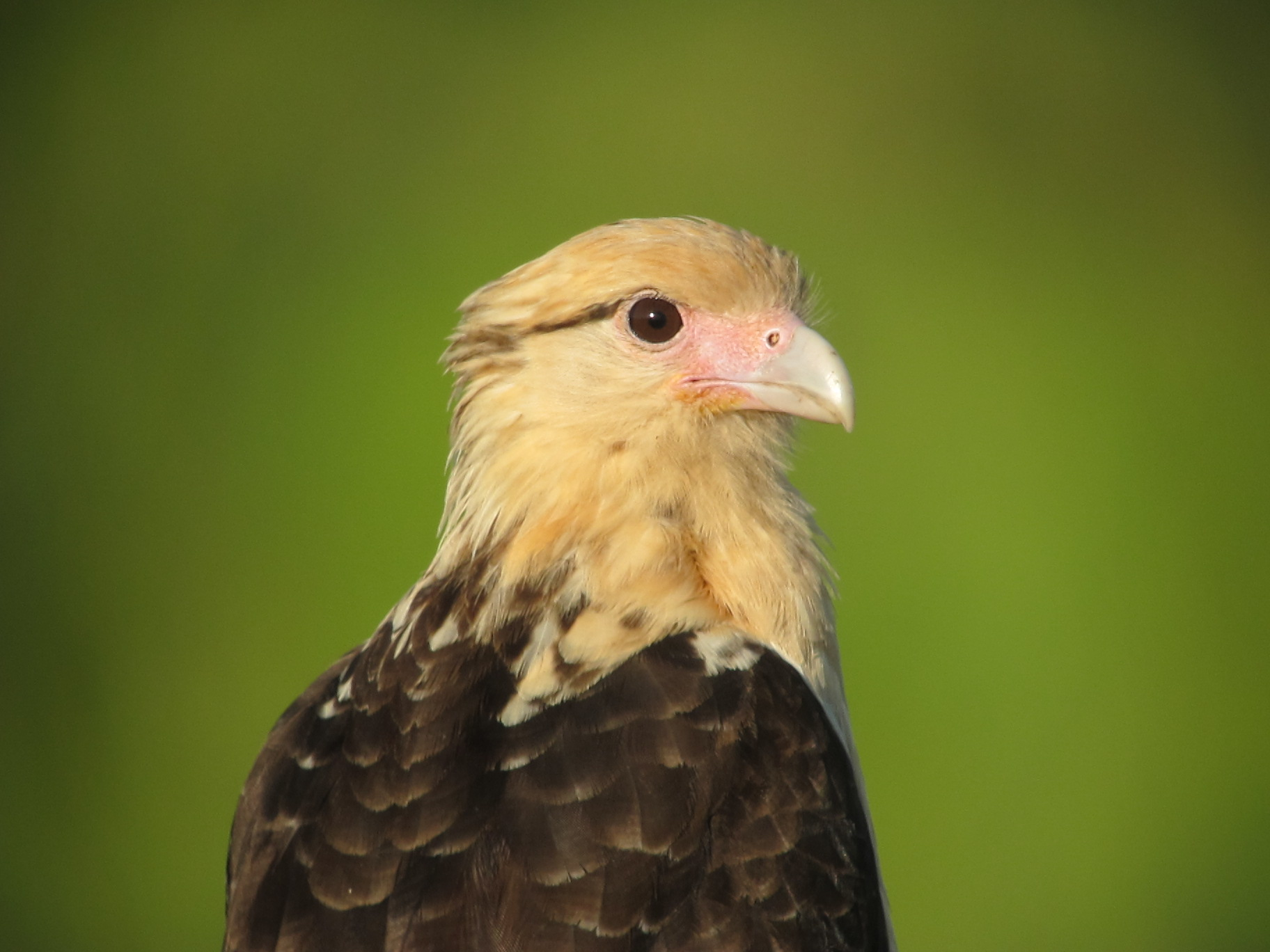
Yellow-headed caracara

Order: Falconiformes Family: Falconidae

- Laughing falcon (Herpetotheres cachinnans)
- Barred forest falcon (Micrastur ruficollis)
- Collared forest falcon (Micrastur semitorquatus)
- Crested caracara (Caracara plancus)
- Yellow-headed caracara (Daptrius chimachima)
- American kestrel (Falco sparverius)
- Bat falcon (Falco rufigularis)
- Aplomado falcon (Falco femoralis)
- Peregrine falcon (Falco peregrinus)

== Parrots ==
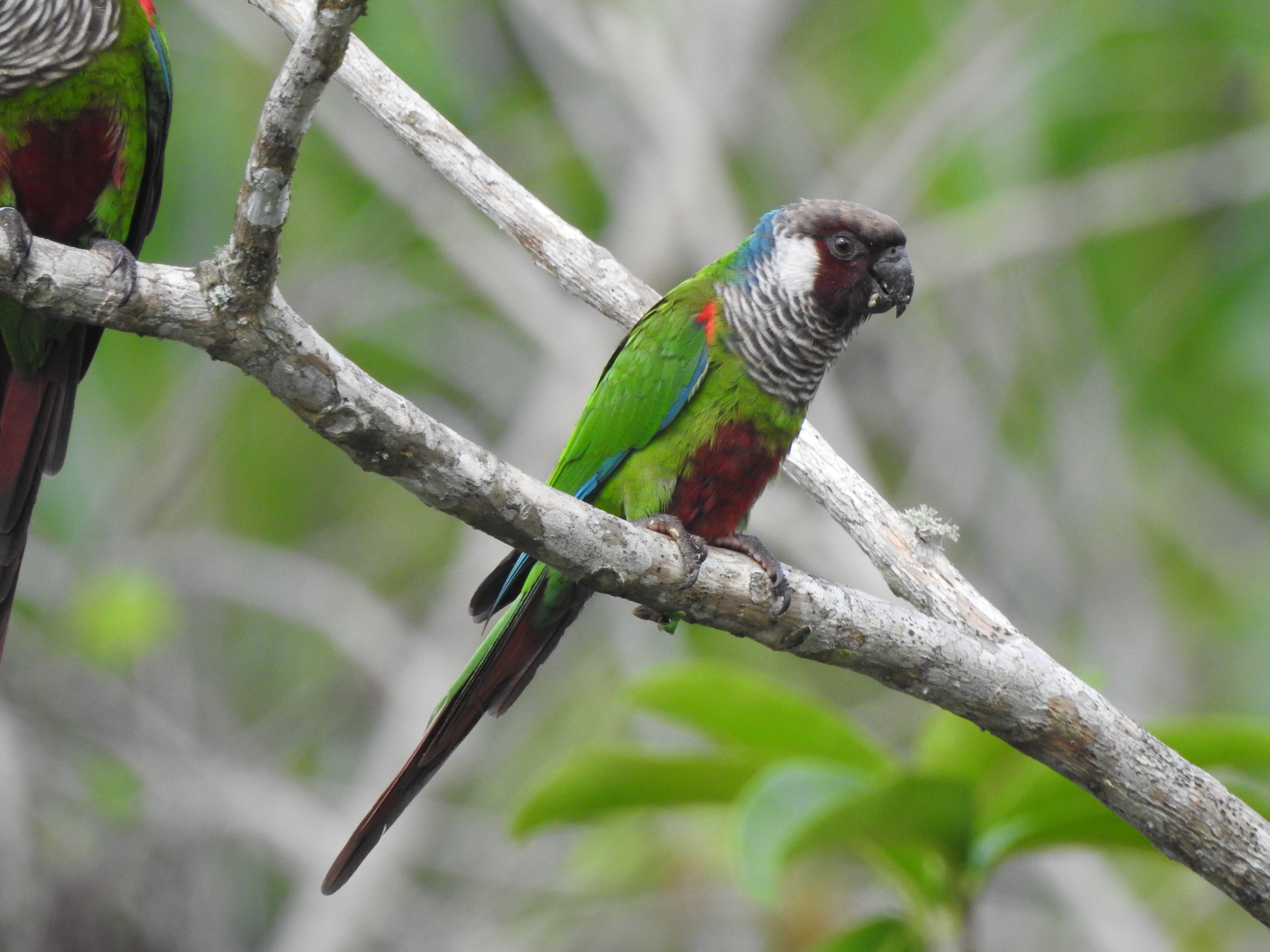
Grey-breasted parakeet

Order: Psittaciformes Family: Psittacidae

- Yellow-chevroned parakeet (Brotogeris chiriri)
- Turquoise-fronted parrot (Amazona aestiva)
- Cobalt-rumped parrotlet (Forpus xanthopterygius)
- Grey-breasted parakeet (Pyrrhura griseipectus) (ES)
- Peach-fronted parakeet (Eupsittula aurea)
- Cactus parakeet (Eupsittula cactorum) (EB)
- Jandaya parakeet (Aratinga jandaya) (EB)
- Blue-winged macaw (Primolius maracana)
- Blue-crowned parakeet (Thectocercus acuticaudatus)

== Manakins ==
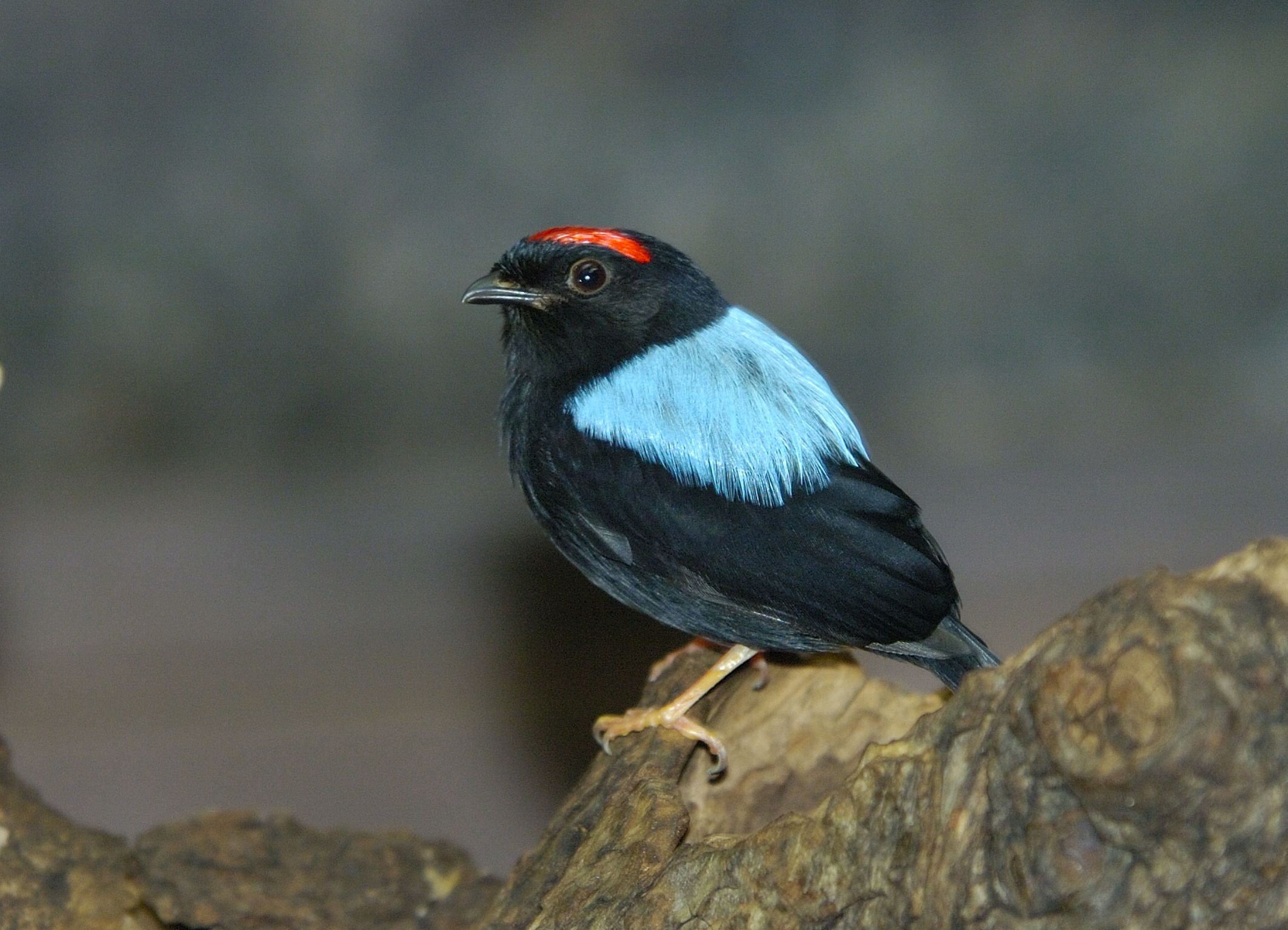
Blue-backed manakin

Order: Passeriformes Family: Pipridae

- Pale-bellied tyrant manakin (Neopelma pallescens)
- Blue-backed manakin (Chiroxiphia pareola)
- Araripe manakin (Antilophia bokermanni) (ES)
- Band-tailed manakin (Pipra fasciicauda)

== Cotingas ==
Order: Passeriformes Family: Cotingidae

- Bearded bellbird (Procnias averano)

== Tityras, mourners, and allies ==
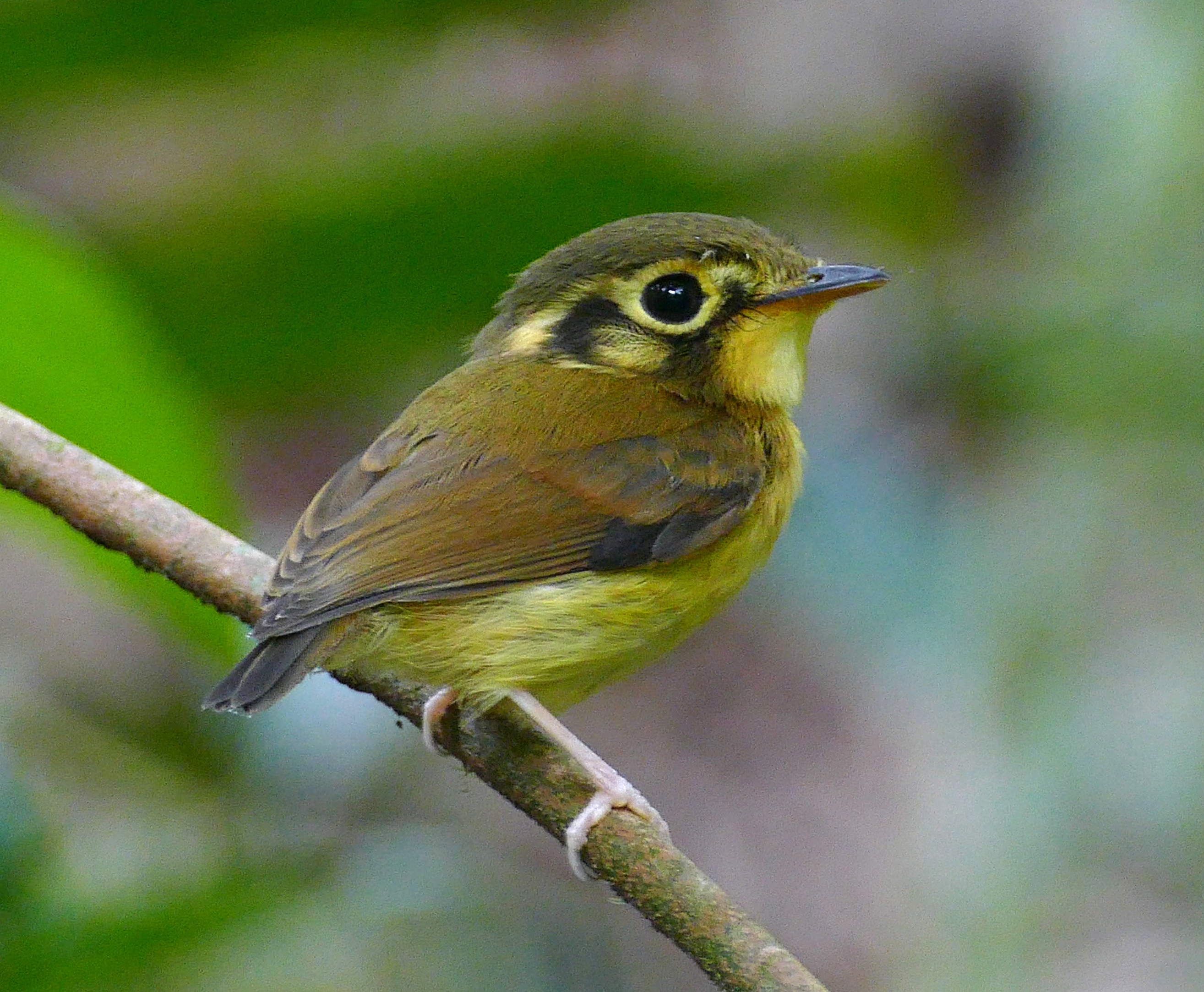
White-throated spadebill

Order: Passeriformes Family: Tityridae

- Black-tailed flycatcher (Myiobius atricaudus)
- Green-backed becard (Pachyramphus viridis)
- White-winged becard (Pachyramphus polychopterus)
- Crested becard (Pachyramphus validus)
- White-naped xenopsaris (Xenopsaris albinucha)
- White-throated spadebill (Platyrinchus mystaceus)

== Tyrant flycatchers ==
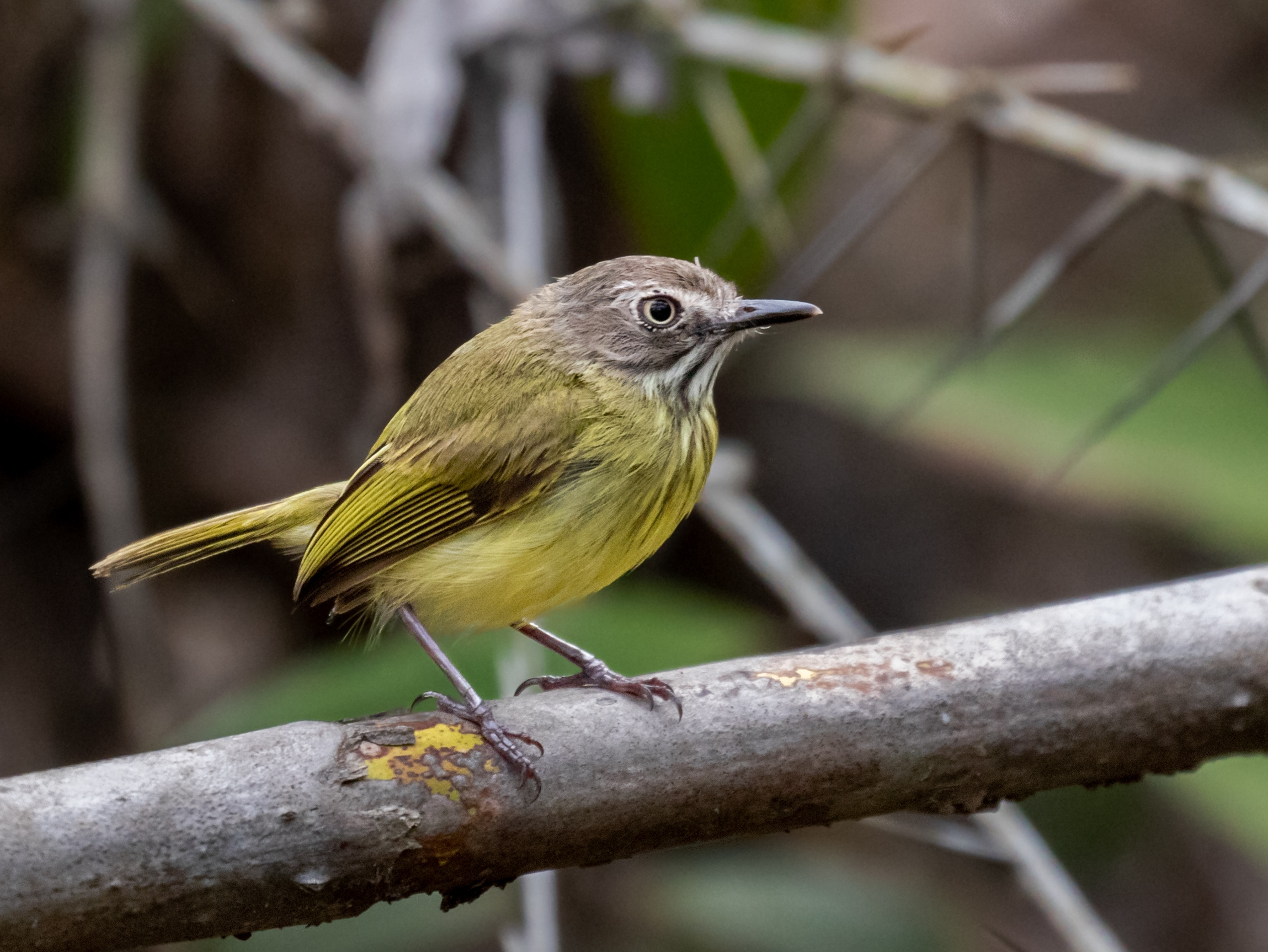
Stripe-necked tody tyrant

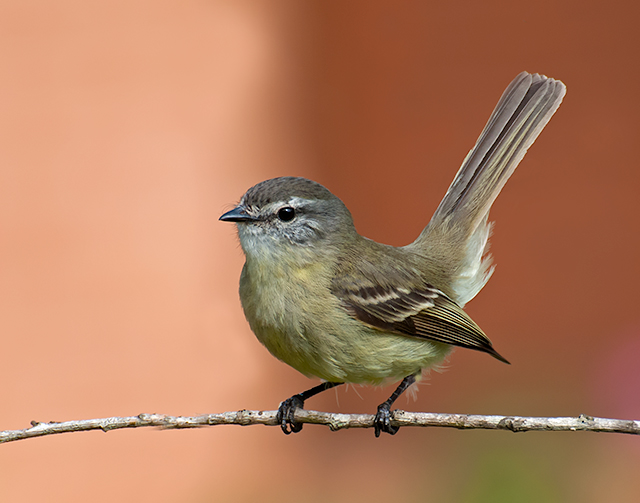
Planalto tyrannulet

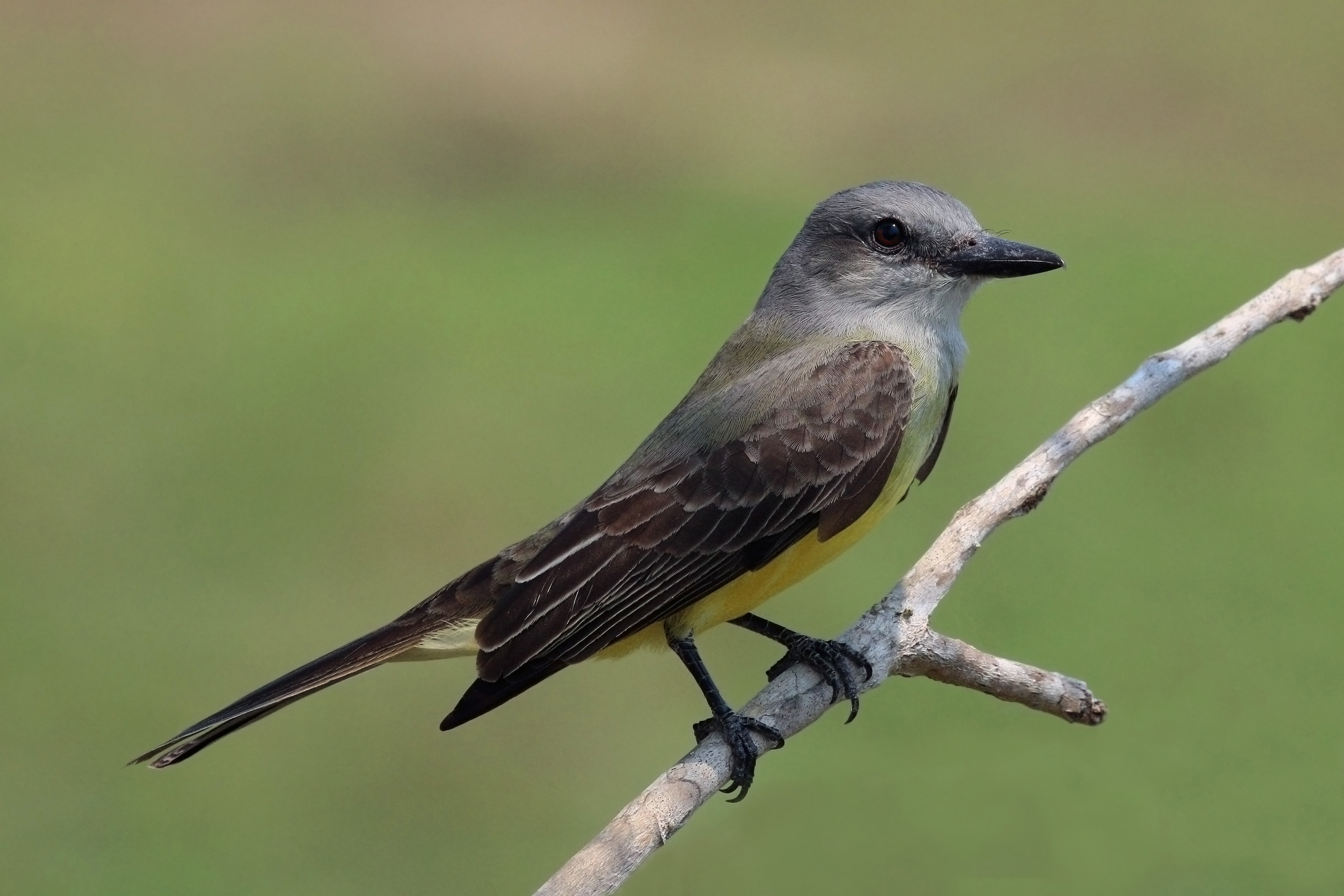
Tropical kingbird

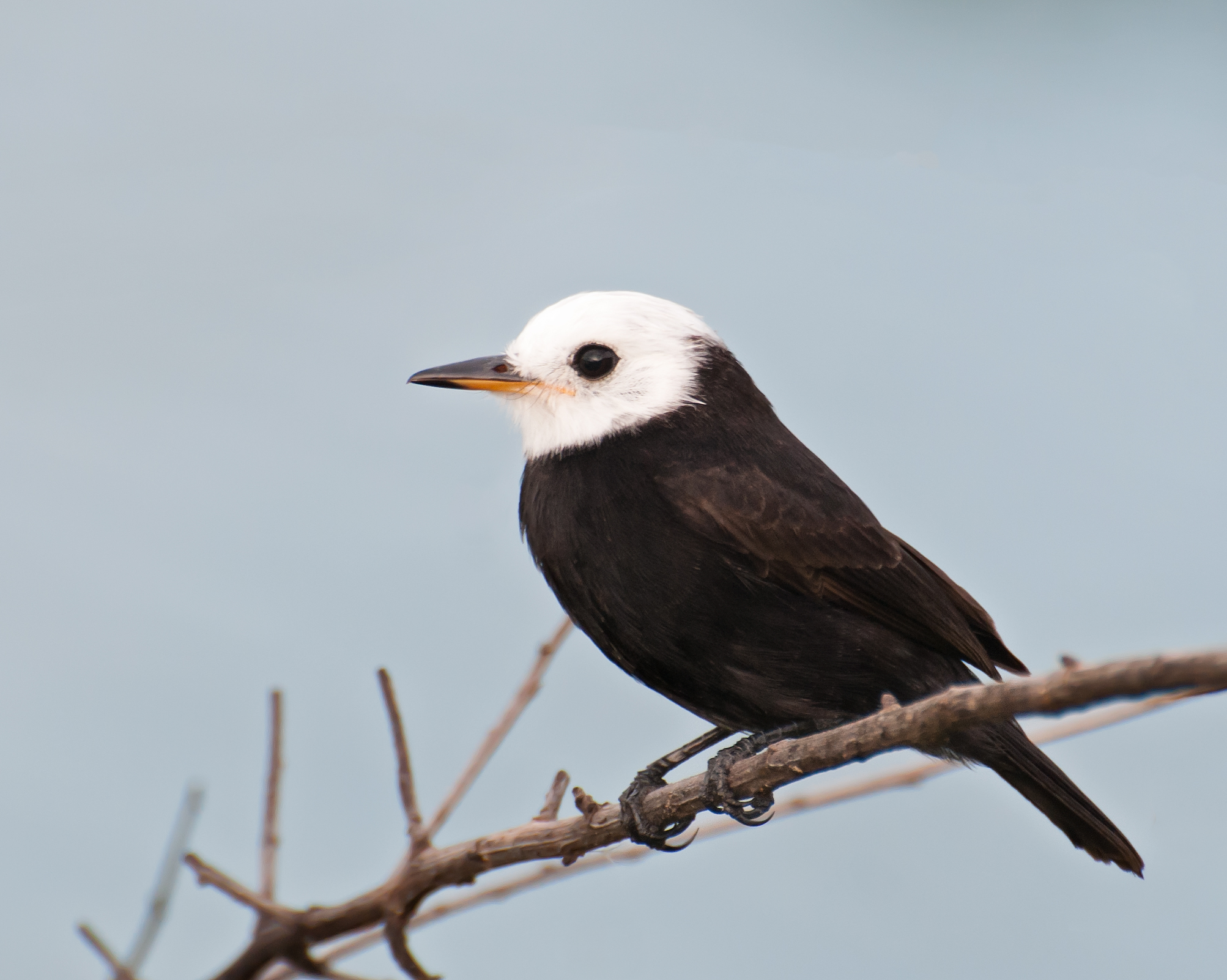
White-headed marsh tyrant

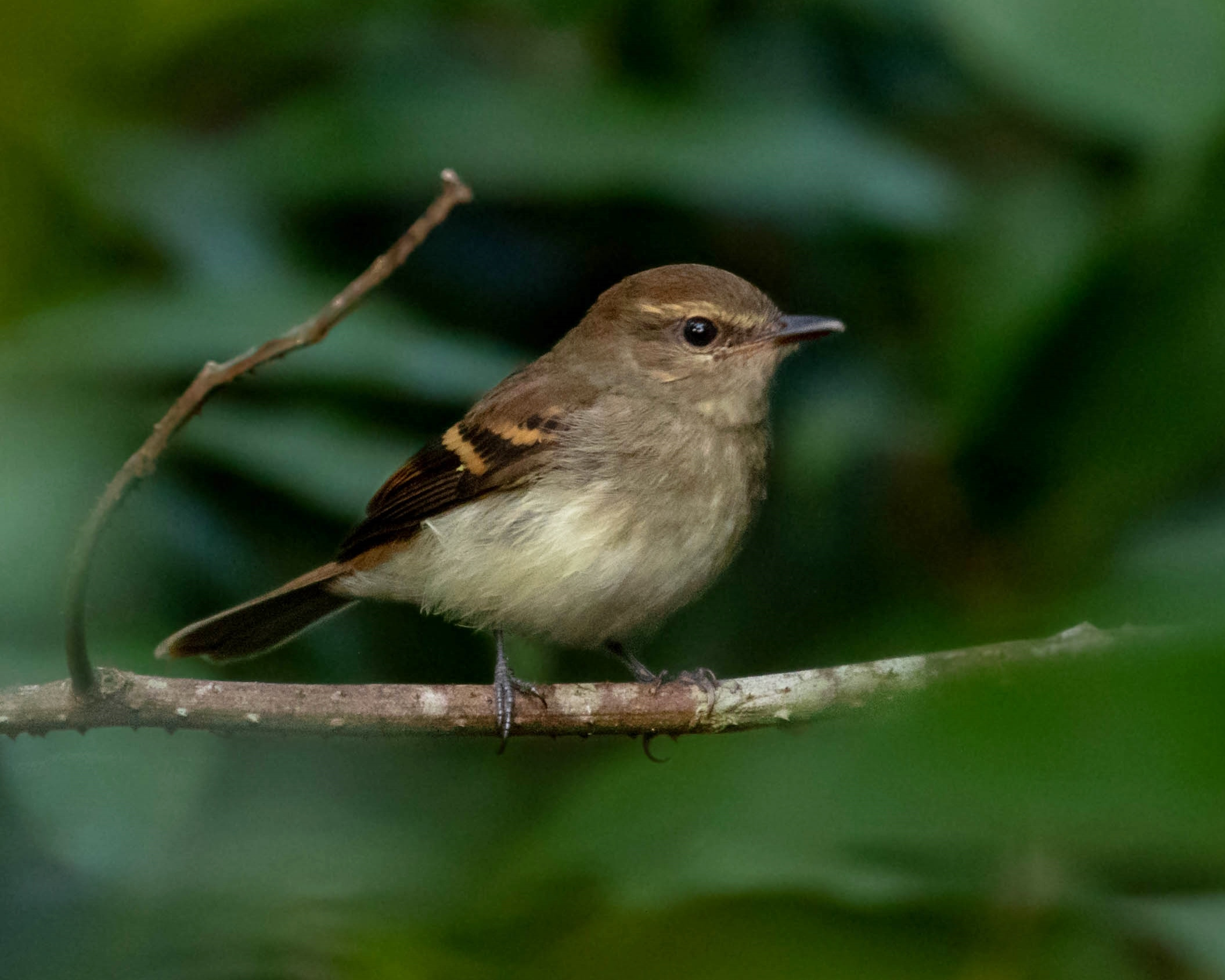
Fuscous flycatcher

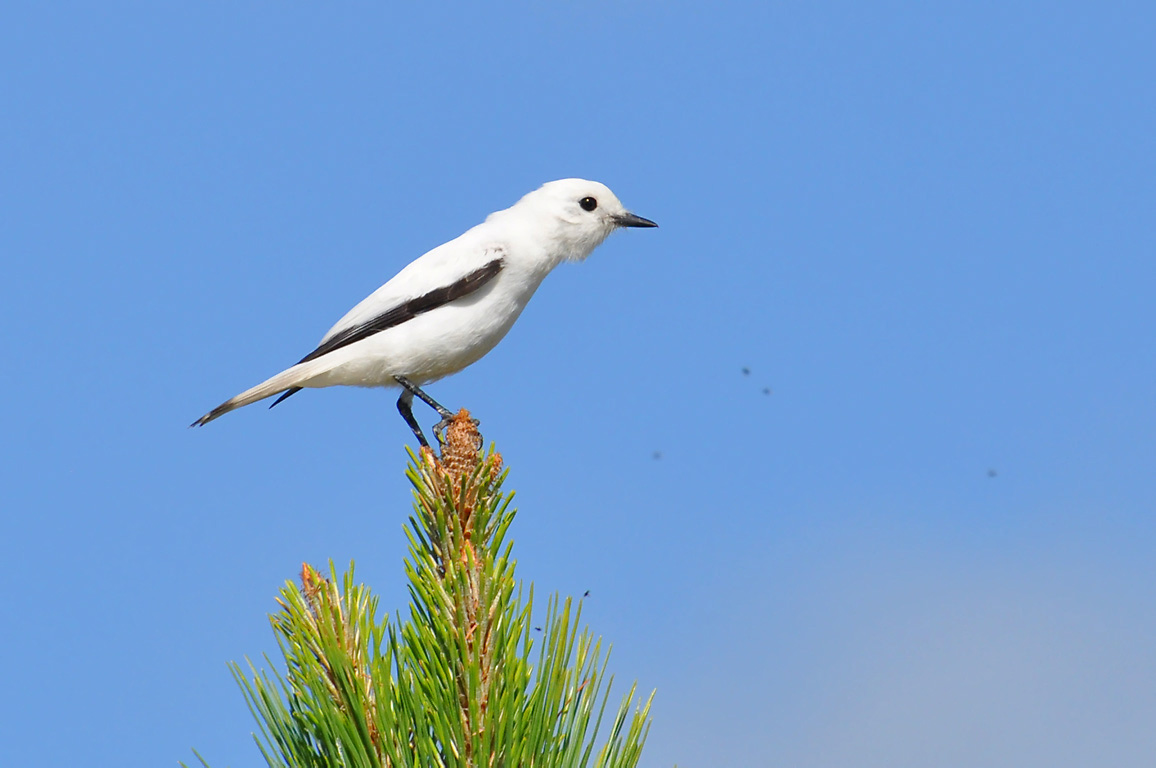
White monjita

Order: Passeriformes Family: Tyrannidae

- Sepia-capped flycatcher (Leptopogon amaurocephalus)
- Yellow-breasted flycatcher (Tolmomyias flaviventris)
- Common tody flycatcher (Todirostrum cinereum)
- Smoky-fronted tody flycatcher (Poecilotriccus fumifrons)
- Stripe-necked tody tyrant (Hemitriccus striaticollis)
- Pearly-vented tody tyrant (Hemitriccus margaritaceiventer)
- Buff-breasted tody tyrant (Hemitriccus mirandae) (EB)
- Cliff flycatcher (Hirundinea ferruginea)
- Guianan tyrannulet (Zimmerius acer)
- Bahia wagtail-tyrant (Stigmatura bahiae) (EB)
- Greater wagtail-tyrant (Stigmatura budytoides)
- Tawny-crowned pygmy tyrant (Euscarthmus meloryphus)
- Southern beardless tyrannulet (Camptostoma obsoletum)
- Yellow-bellied elaenia (Elaenia flavogaster)
- Large elaenia (Elaenia spectabilis)
- Chilean elaenia (Elaenia chilensis)
- Plain-crested elaenia (Elaenia cristata)
- Lesser elaenia (Elaenia chiriquensis)
- White-crested elaenia (Elaenia albiceps)
- Suiriri flycatcher (Suiriri suiriri)
- Grey-headed elaenia (Myiopagis caniceps)
- Greenish elaenia (Myiopagis viridicata)
- Southern mouse-colored tyrannulet (Phaeomyias murina)
- Planalto tyrannulet (Phyllomyias fasciatus)
- Bright-rumped attila (Attila spadiceus)
- Piratic flycatcher (Legatus leucophaius)
- Swainson's flycatcher (Myiarchus swainsoni)
- Short-crested flycatcher (Myiarchus ferox)
- Brown-crested flycatcher (Myiarchus tyrannulus)
- Ash-throated casiornis (Casiornis fuscus)
- Great kiskadee (Pitangus sulphuratus)
- Cattle tyrant (Machetornis rixosa)
- Streaked flycatcher (Myiodynastes maculatus)
- Boat-billed flycatcher (Megarynchus pitangua)
- Rusty-margined flycatcher (Myiozetetes cayanensis)
- Social flycatcher (Myiozetetes similis)
- Tropical kingbird (Tyrannus melancholicus)
- Fork-tailed flycatcher (Tyrannus savana)
- Crowned slaty flycatcher (Griseotyrannus aurantioatrocristatus)
- Variegated flycatcher (Empidonomus varius)
- Southern scrub flycatcher (Sublegatus modestus)
- White-headed marsh tyrant (Arundinicola leucocephala)
- Black-backed water tyrant (Fluvicola albiventer)
- Masked water tyrant (Fluvicola nengeta)
- Vermilion flycatcher (Pyrocephalus rubinus)
- Bran-colored flycatcher (Myiophobus fasciatus)
- Fuscous flycatcher (Cnemotriccus fuscatus)
- Euler's flycatcher (Lathrotriccus euleri)
- Southern tropical pewee (Contopus cinereus)
- Yellow-browed tyrant (Satrapa icterophrys) (A)
- Velvety black tyrant (Knipolegus nigerrimus) (EB)
- White monjita (Xolmis irupero)
- Grey monjita (Xolmis cinereus)

== Antbirds ==
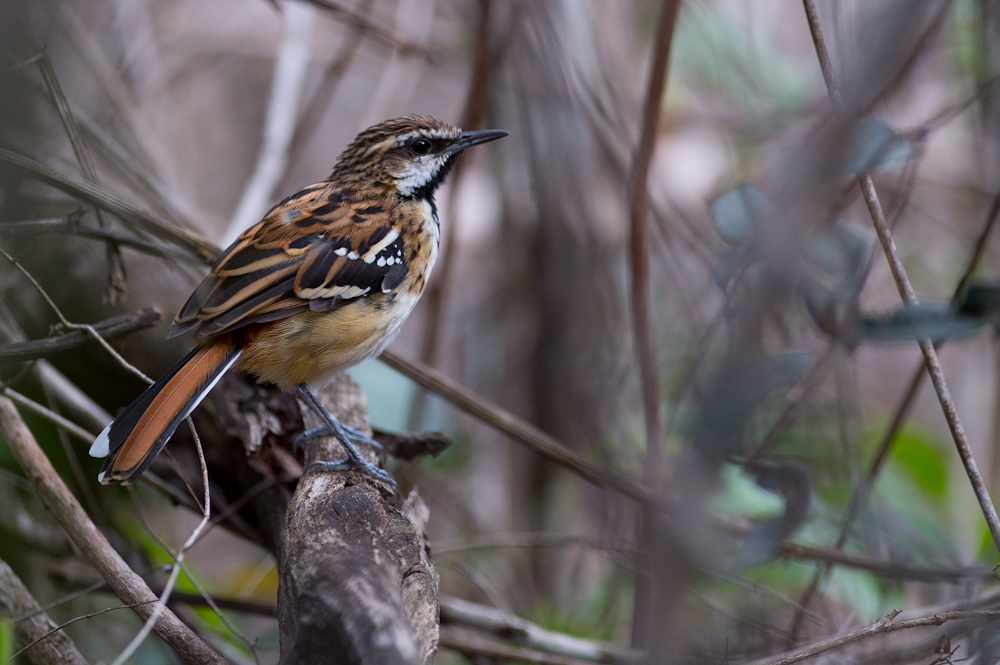
Stripe-backed antbird

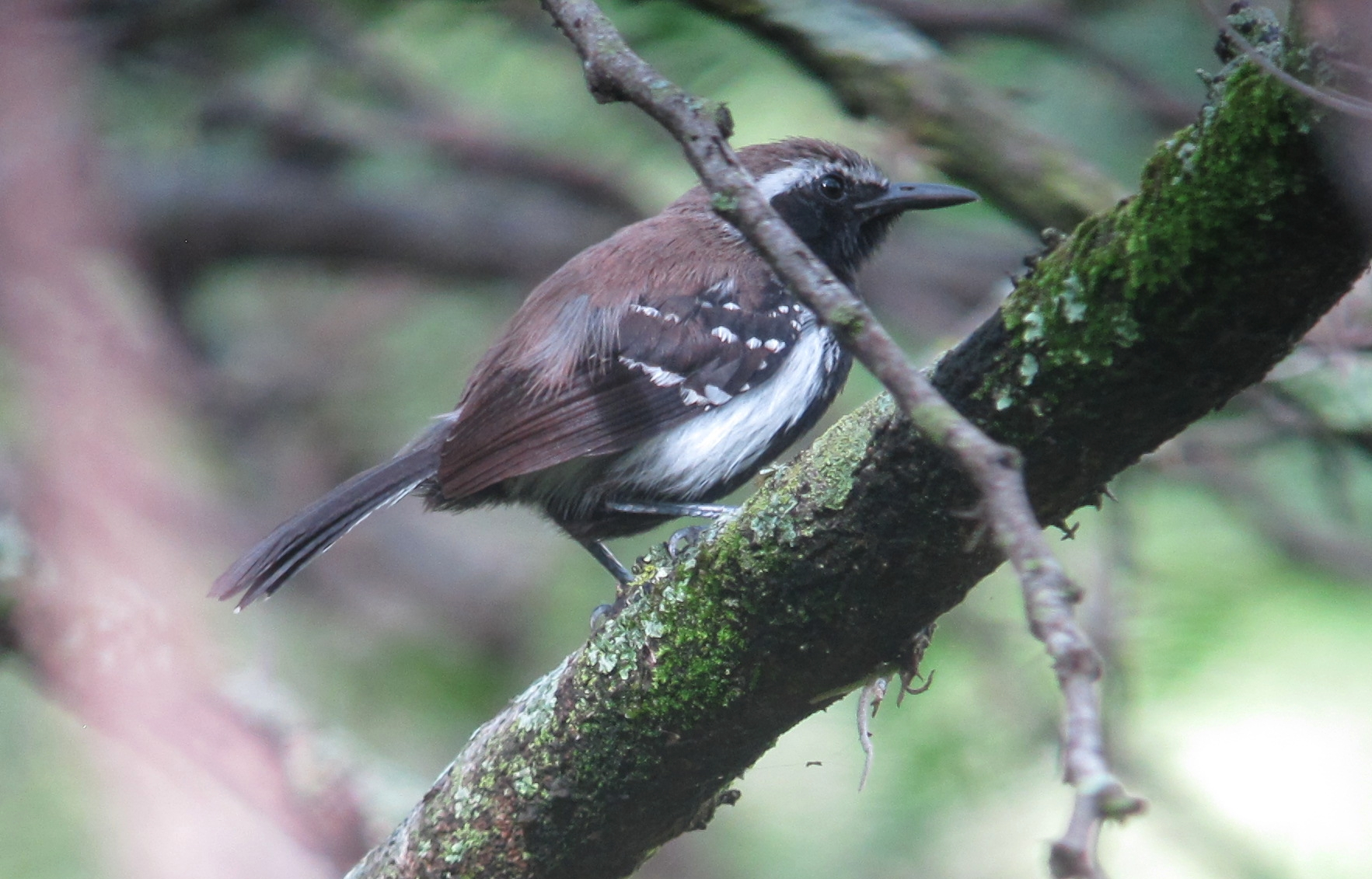
Southern white-fringed antwren

Order: Passeriformes Family: Thamnophilidae

- Stripe-backed antbird (Myrmorchilus strigilatus)
- Southern white-fringed antwren (Formicivora grisea)
- Black-bellied antwren (Formicivora melanogaster)
- Rusty-backed antwren (Formicivora rufa)
- Silvery-cheeked antshrike (Sakesphorus cristatus) (EB)
- Plain antvireo (Dysithamnus mentalis)
- Black-capped antwren (Herpsilochmus atricapillus)
- Barred antshrike (Thamnophilus doliatus)
- Rufous-winged antshrike (Thamnophilus torquatus)
- Planalto slaty antshrike (Thamnophilus pelzelni) (EB)
- Variable antshrike (Thamnophilus caerulescens)
- Great antshrike (Taraba major)
- Caatinga antwren (Radinopsyche sellowi) (EB)

== Gnateaters ==
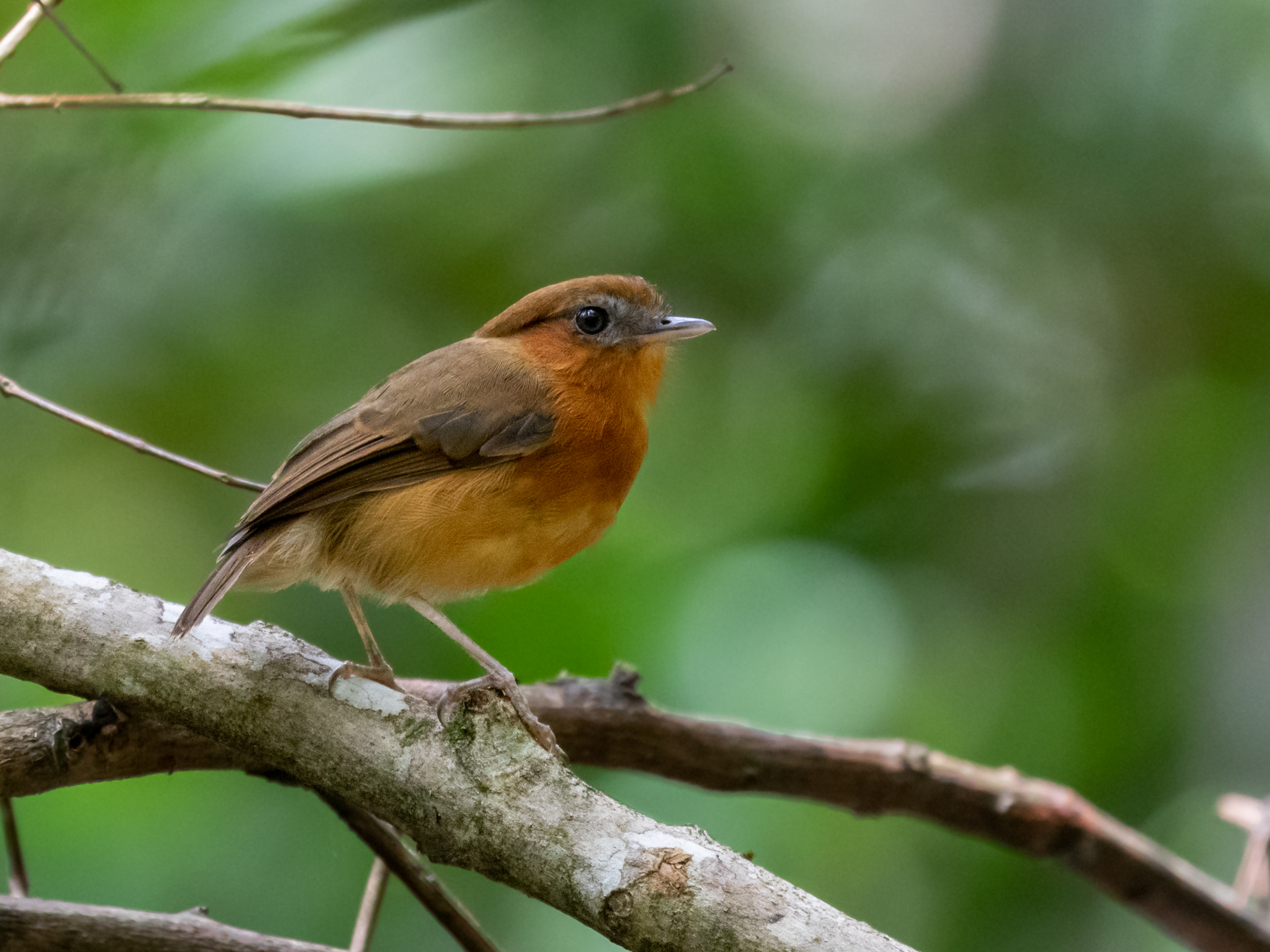
Ceará gnateater

Order: Passeriformes Family: Conopophagidae

- Ceará gnateater (Conopophaga cearae) (EB)
- Hooded gnateater (Conopophaga roberti) (EB)

== Antpittas ==
Order: Passeriformes Family: Grallariidae

- White-browed antpitta (Hylopezus ochroleucus) (EB)

== Ground antbirds ==
Order: Passeriformes Family: Formicariidae

- Short-tailed antthrush (Chamaeza campanisona)

== Ovenbirds ==
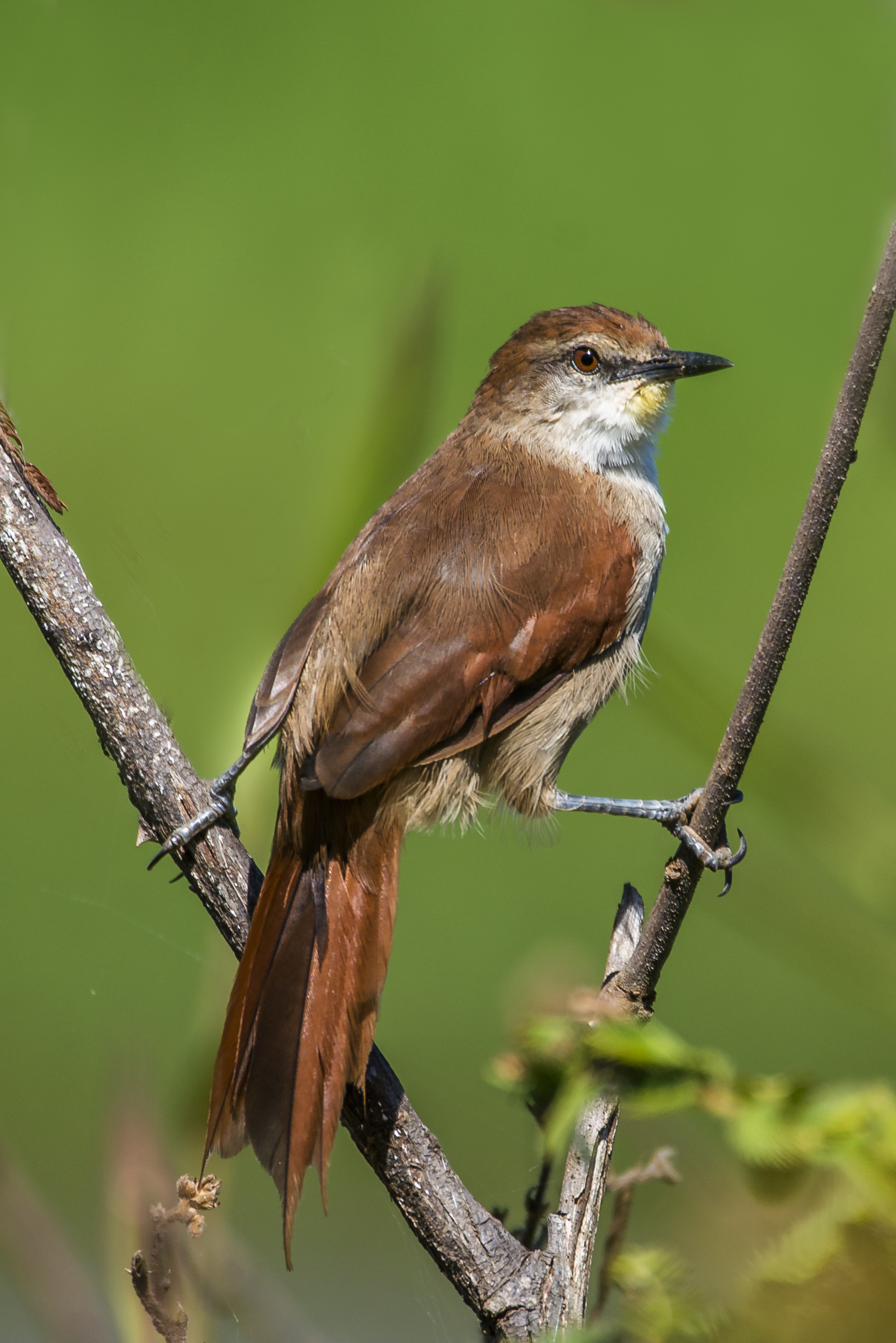
Yellow-chinned spinetail

Order: Passeriformes Family: Furnariidae

- Rufous-breasted leaftosser (Sclerurus scansor)
- Streaked xenops (Xenops rutilans)
- Point-tailed palmcreeper (Berlepschia rikeri)
- Band-tailed hornero (Furnarius figulus) (EB)
- Pale-legged hornero (Furnarius leucopus)
- Great xenops (Megaxenops parnaguae)
- Rufous-fronted thornbird (Phacellodomus rufifrons)
- Grey-headed spinetail (Cranioleuca semicinerea) (EB)
- Caatinga cacholote (Pseudoseisura cristata) (EB)
- Yellow-chinned spinetail (Certhiaxis cinnamomeus)
- Ochre-cheeked spinetail (Synallaxis scutata)
- Red-shouldered spinetail (Synallaxis hellmayri) (EB)
- Pale-breasted spinetail (Synallaxis albescens)
- Sooty-fronted spinetail (Synallaxis frontalis)
- Olivaceous woodcreeper (Sittasomus griseicapillus)
- Planalto woodcreeper (Dendrocolaptes platyrostris)
- Moustached woodcreeper (Xiphocolaptes falcirostris) (EB)
- Ceara woodcreeper (Xiphorhynchus atlanticus) (EB)
- Buff-throated woodcreeper (Xiphorhynchus guttatus)
- Straight-billed woodcreeper (Dendroplex picus)
- Red-billed scythebill (Campylorhamphus trochilirostris)
- Narrow-billed woodcreeper (Lepidocolaptes angustirostris)

== Vireos and allies ==
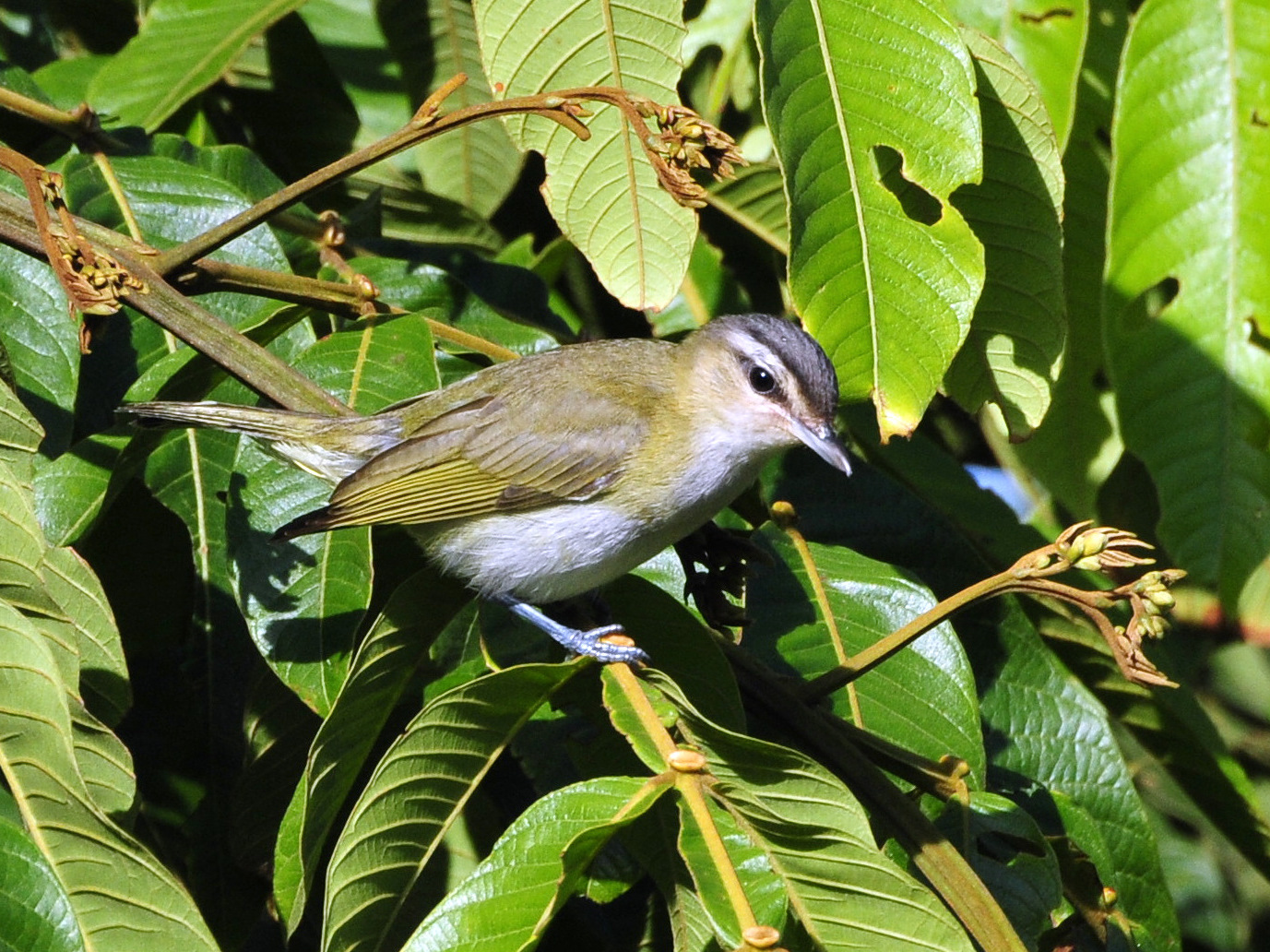
Chivi vireo

Order: Passeriformes Family: Vireonidae

- Rufous-browed peppershrike (Cyclarhis gujanensis)
- Grey-eyed greenlet (Hylophilus amaurocephalus)
- Ashy-headed greenlet (Hylophilus pectoralis)
- Chivi vireo (Vireo chivi)

== Crows, jays, and allies ==
Order: Passeriformes Family: Corvidae

- White-naped jay (Cyanocorax cyanopogon) (EB)

== Estrildid finches ==
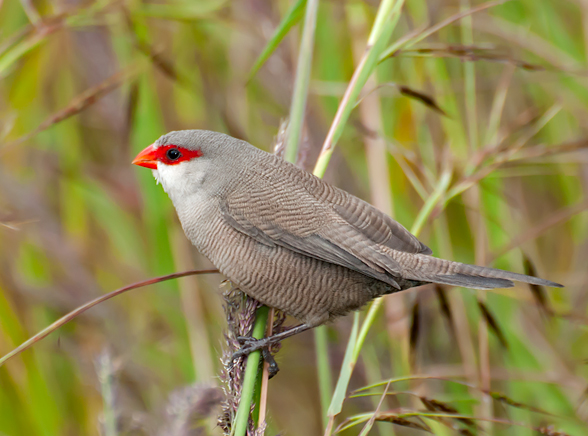
Common waxbill

Order: Passeriformes Family: Estrildidae

- Common waxbill (Estrilda astrild) (I)

== Old World sparrows ==
Order: Passeriformes Family: Passeridae

- House sparrow (Passer domesticus) (I)

== Pipits ==
Order: Passeriformes Family: Motacillidae

- Yellowish pipit (Anthus chii)

== Finches and euphonias ==
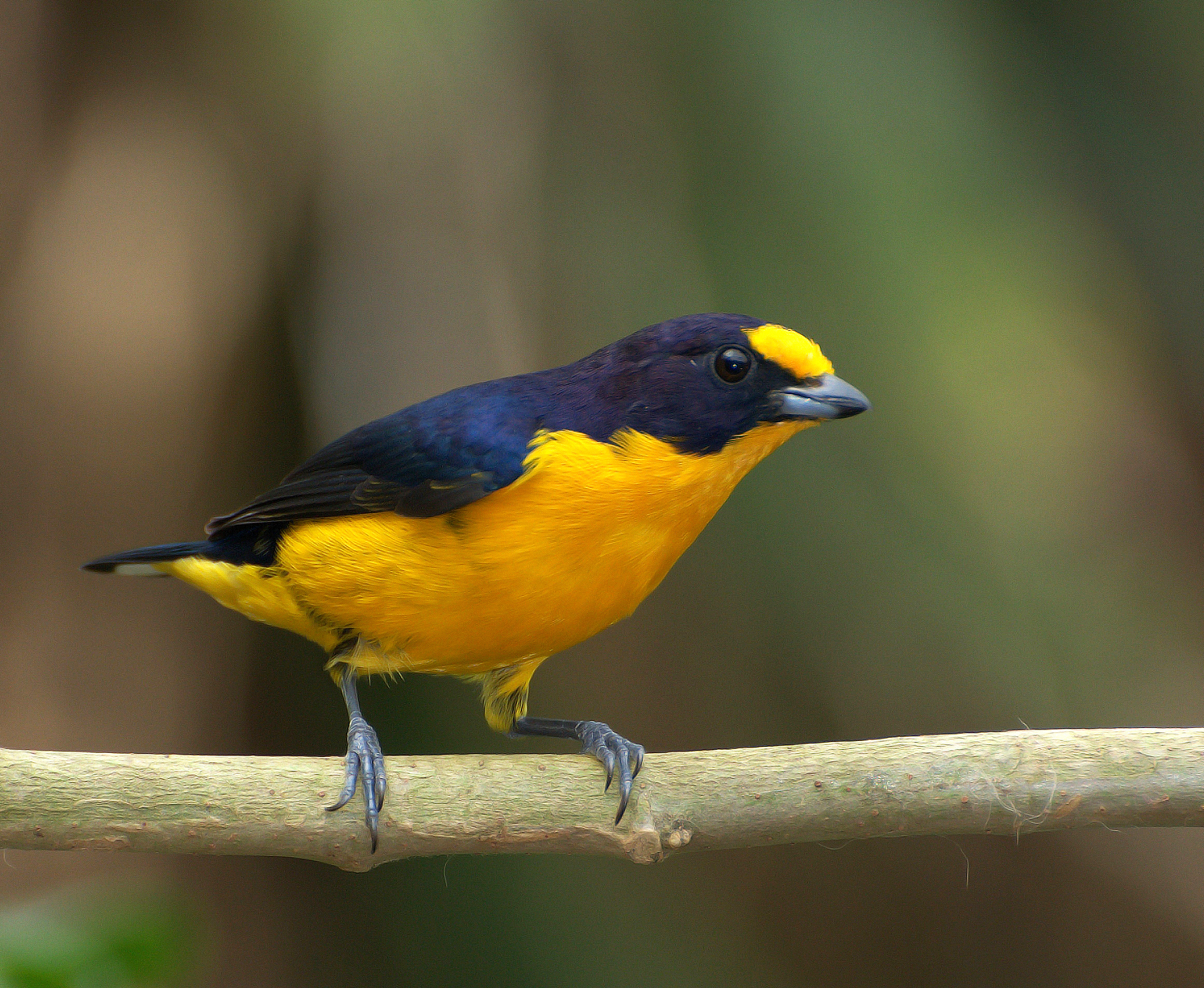
Violaceous euphonia

Order: Passeriformes Family: Fringillidae

- Yellow-faced siskin (Spinus yarrellii) (EB)
- Purple-throated euphonia (Euphonia chlorotica)
- Violaceous euphonia (Euphonia violacea)

== New World sparrows ==
Order: Passeriformes Family: Passerellidae

- Grassland sparrow (Ammodramus humeralis)
- Pectoral sparrow (Arremon taciturnus)
- Rufous-collared sparrow (Zonotrichia capensis)

== New World warblers ==
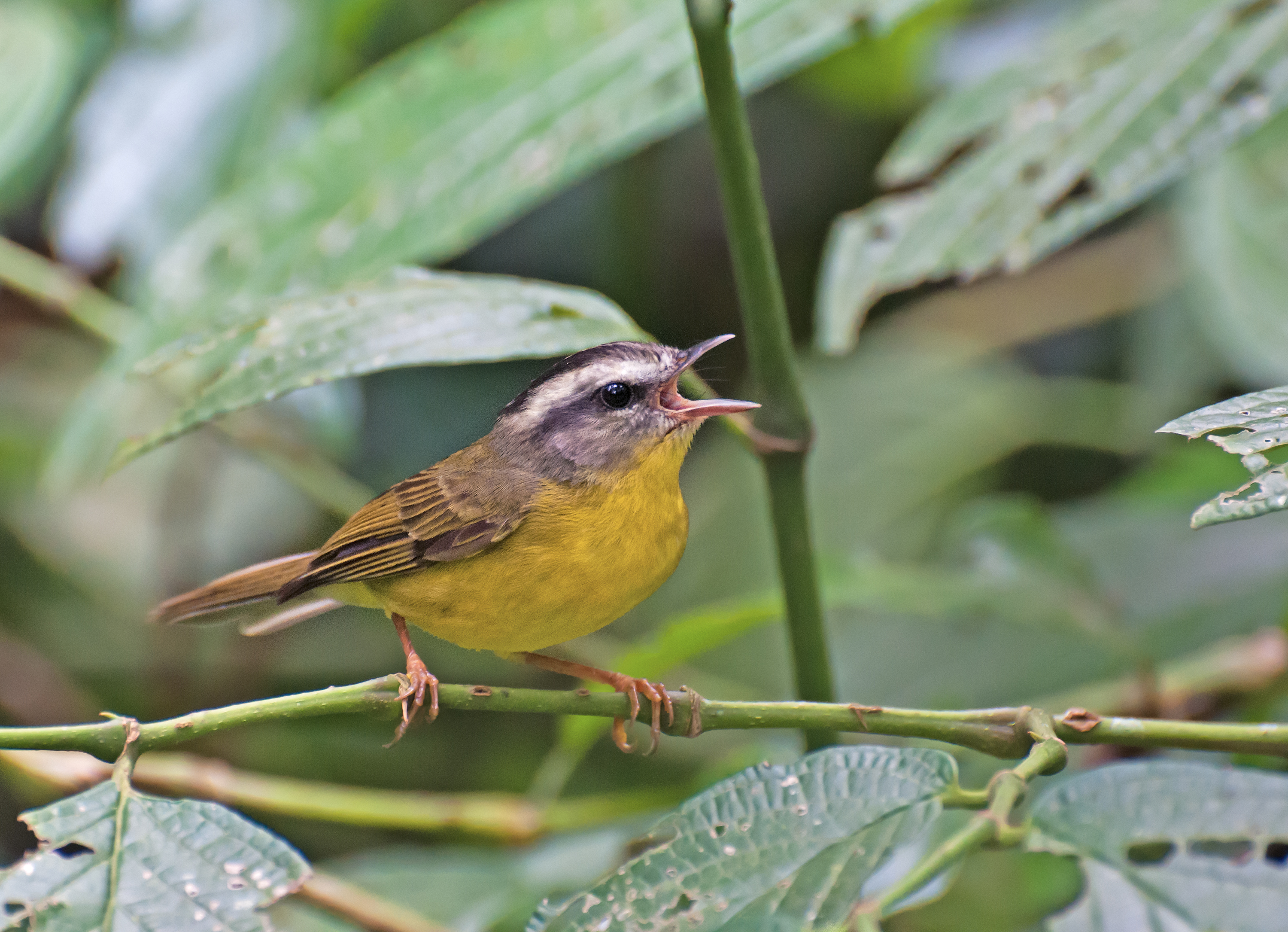
Golden-crowned warbler

Order: Passeriformes Family: Parulidae

- American redstart (Setophaga ruticilla)
- Tropical parula (Setophaga pitiayumi)
- Blackburnian warbler (Setophaga fusca) (A)
- Flavescent warbler (Myiothlypis flaveola)
- Golden-crowned warbler (Basileuterus culicivorus)

== Icterids ==
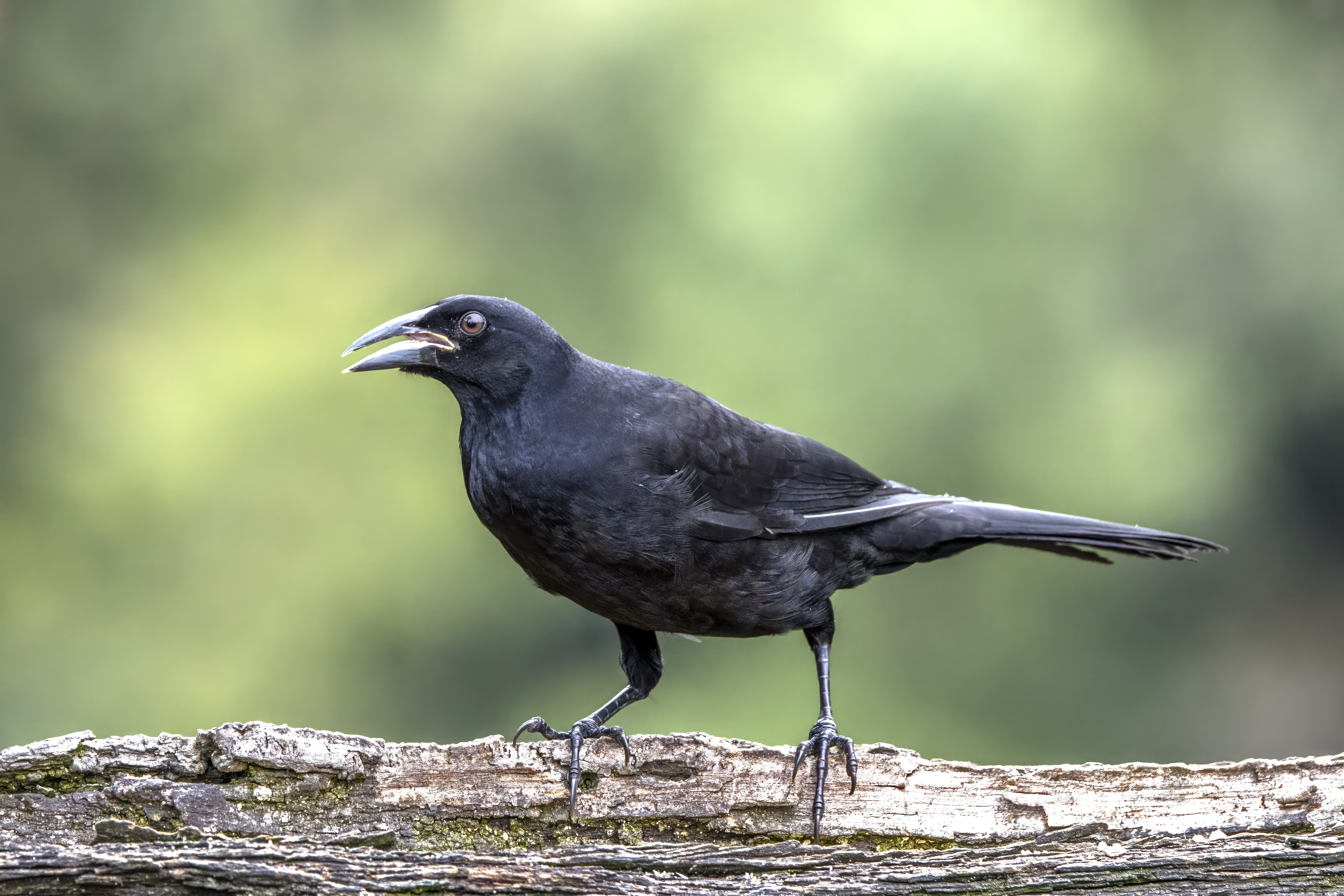
Giant cowbird

Order: Passeriformes Family: Icteridae

- Red-breasted meadowlark (Leistes militaris)
- White-browed meadowlark (Leistes superciliaris)
- Crested oropendola (Psarocolius decumanus)
- Solitary cacique (Cacicus solitarius)
- Yellow-rumped cacique (Cacicus cela)
- Campo troupial (Icterus jamacaii) (EB)
- Variable oriole (Icterus pyrrhopterus)
- Screaming cowbird (Molothrus rufoaxillaris)
- Giant cowbird (Molothrus oryzivorus)
- Shiny cowbird (Molothrus bonariensis)
- Chopi blackbird (Gnorimopsar chopi)
- Pale baywing (Agelaioides fringillarius)
- Chestnut-capped blackbird (Chrysomus ruficapillus)

== Cardinals, grosbeaks, and allies ==
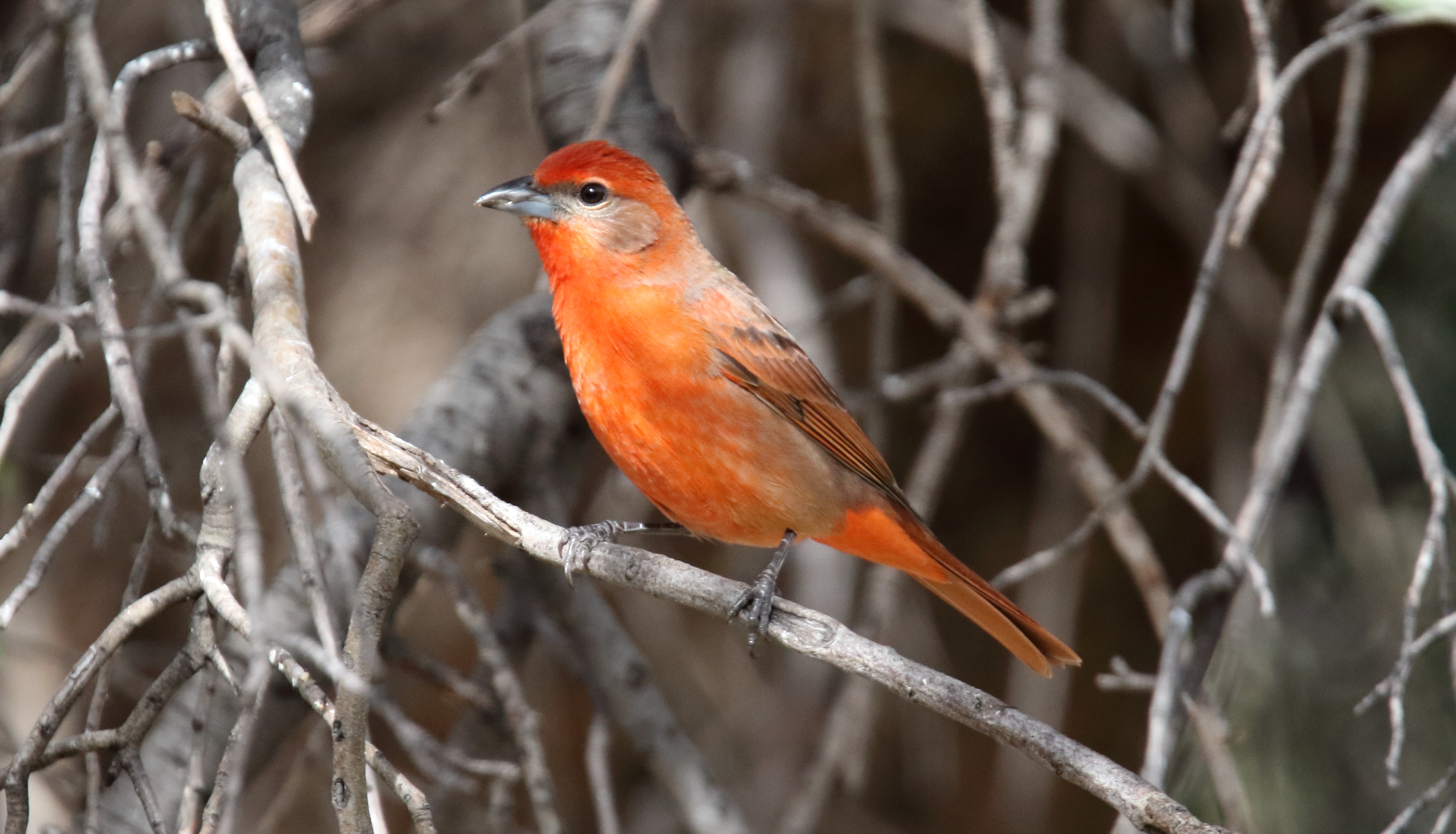
Hepatic tanager

Order: Passeriformes Family: Cardinalidae

- Hepatic tanager (Piranga flava)
- Summer tanager (Piranga rubra) (A)
- Ultramarine grosbeak (Cyanoloxia brissonii)

== South American tanagers ==
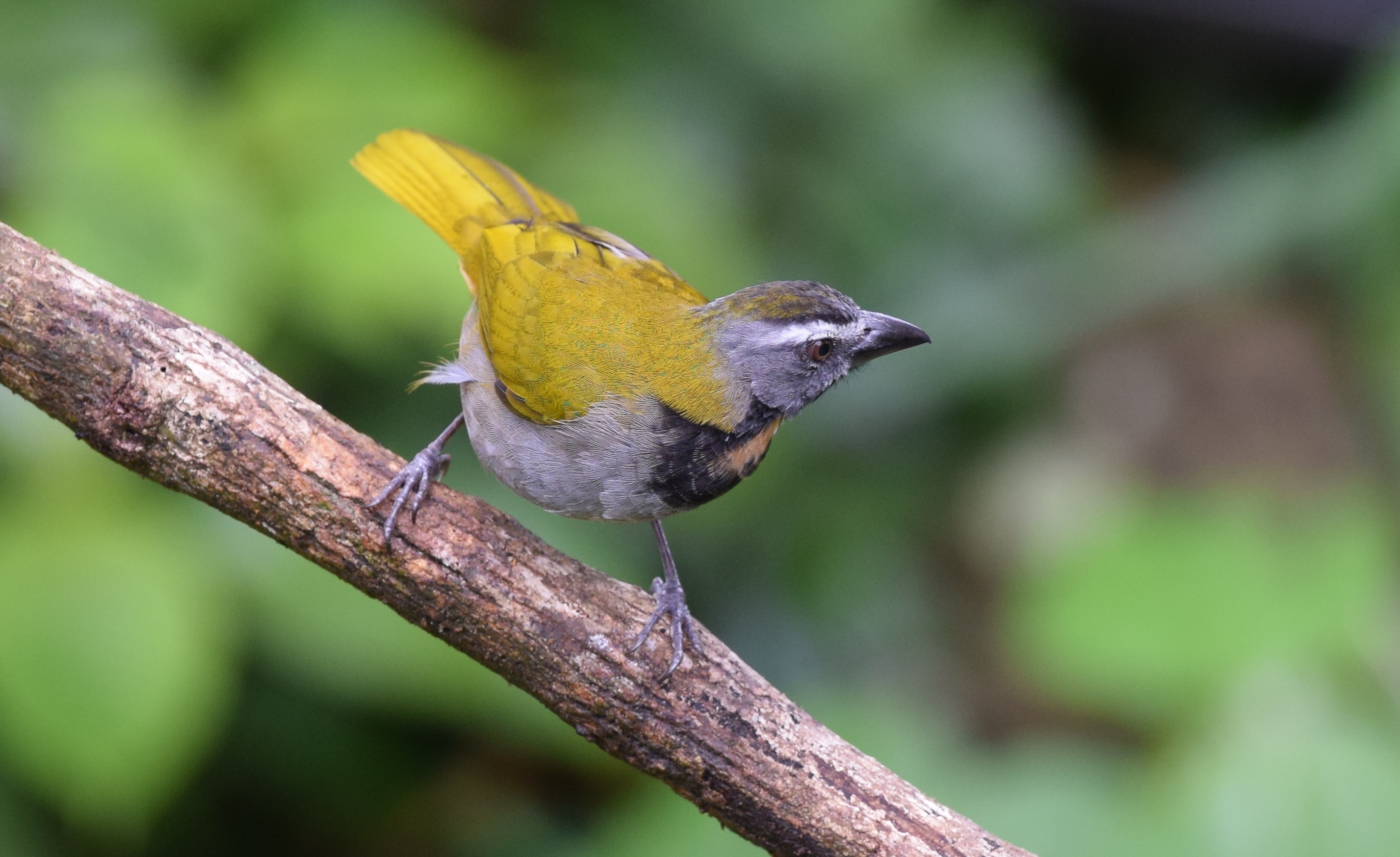
Buff-throated saltator

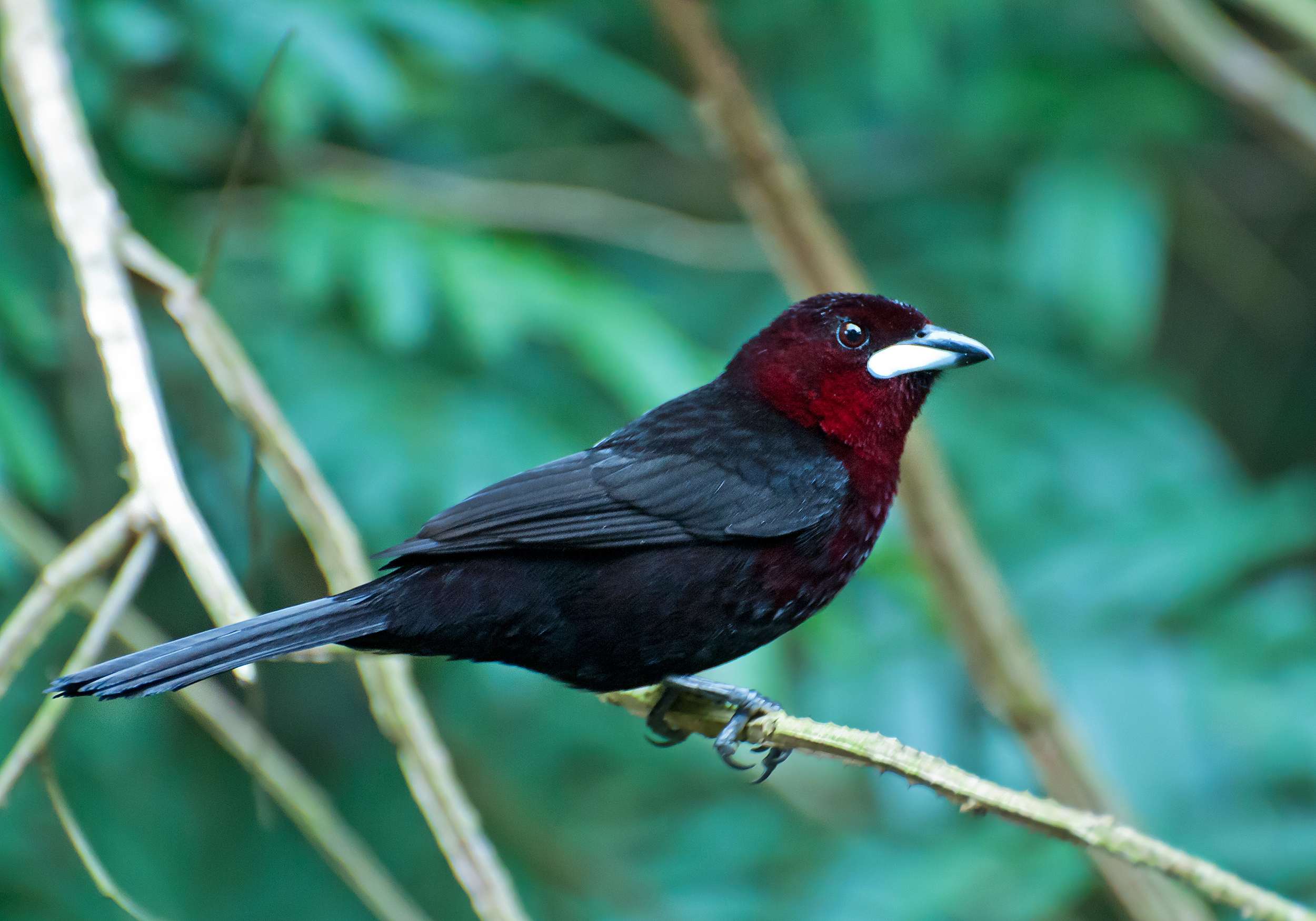
Silver-beaked tanager

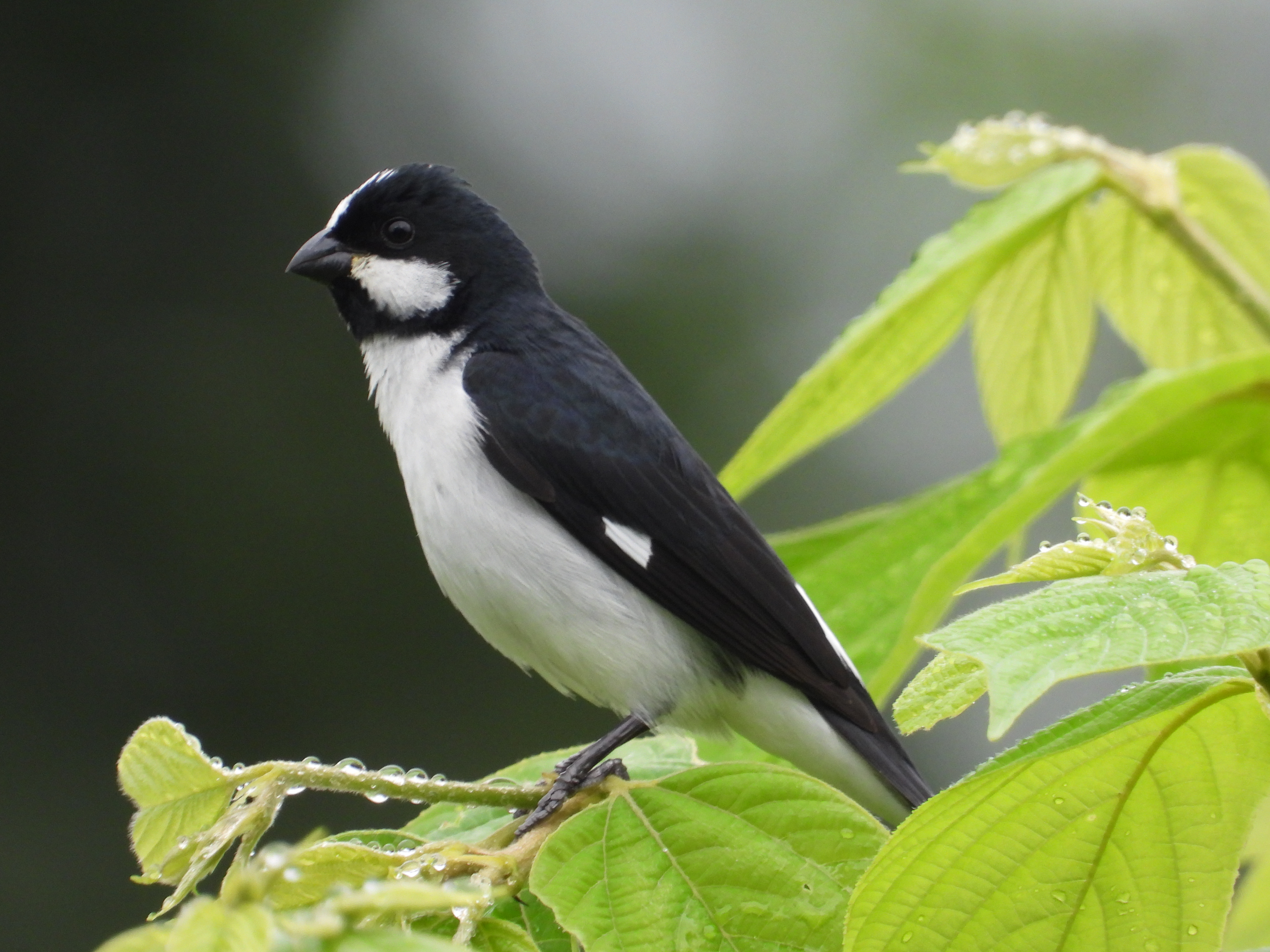
Lined seedeater

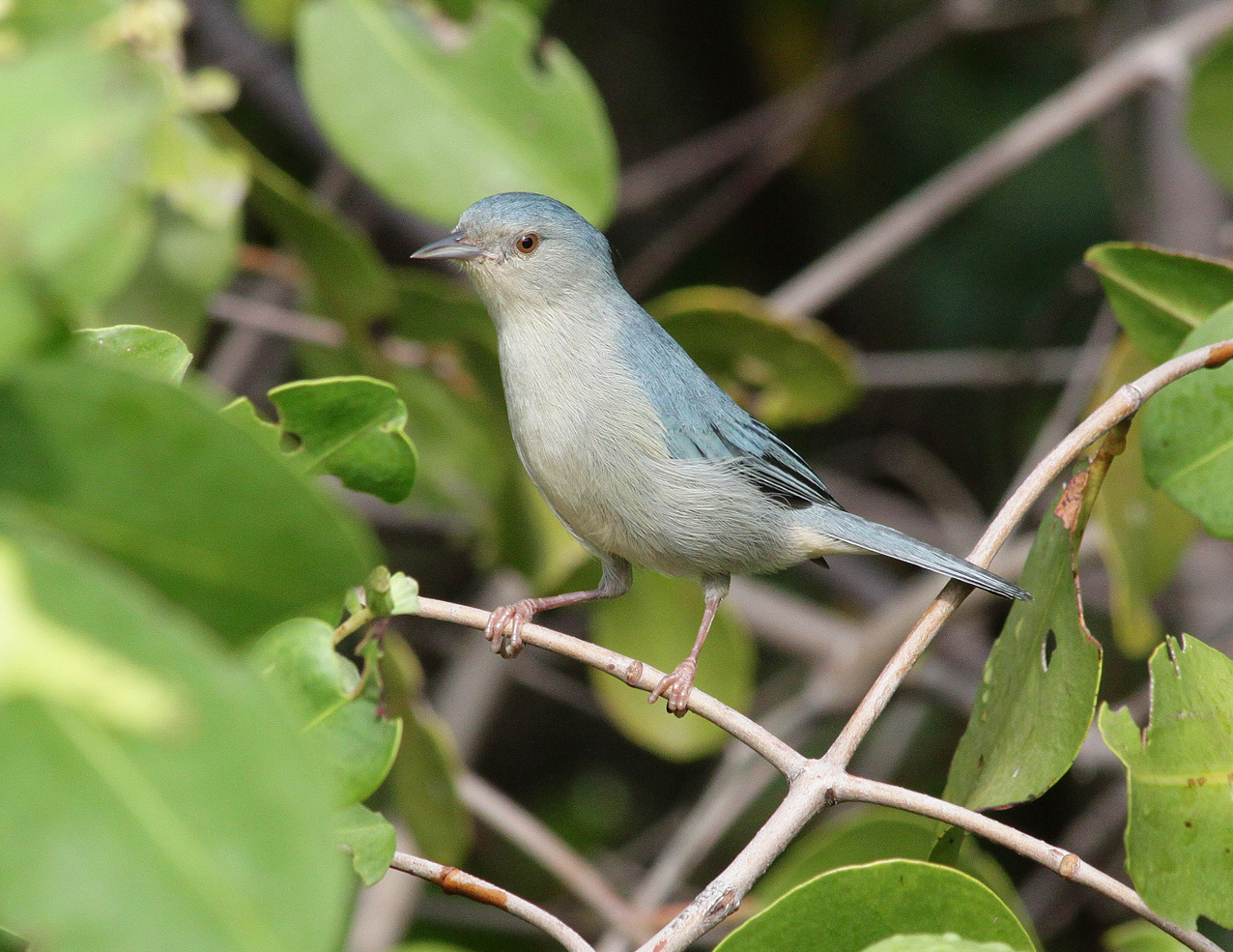
Bicolored conebill

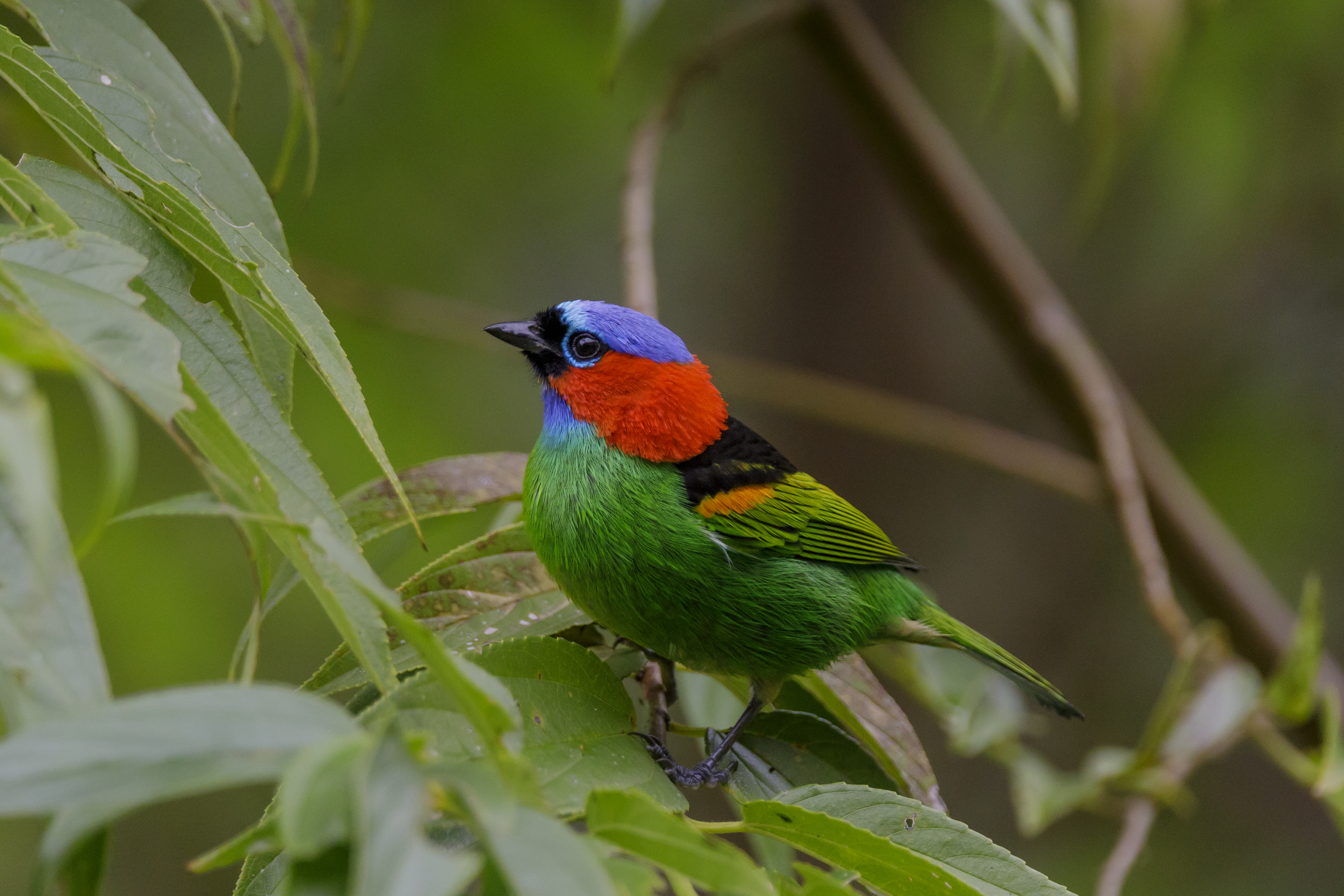
Red-necked tanager

Order: Passeriformes Family: Thraupidae

- Hooded tanager (Nemosia pileata)
- Scarlet-throated tanager (Compsothraupis loricata) (EB)
- Guira tanager (Hemithraupis guira)
- Swallow tanager (Tersina viridis)
- Red-legged honeycreeper (Cyanerpes cyaneus) (A)
- Blue dacnis (Dacnis cayana)
- Black-throated saltator (Saltatricula atricollis)
- Buff-throated saltator (Saltator maximus)
- Green-winged saltator (Saltator similis)
- Bananaquit (Coereba flaveola)
- Sooty grassquit (Asemospiza fuliginosa)
- Blue-black grassquit (Volatinia jacarina)
- Grey-headed tanager (Eucometis penicillata)
- Pileated finch (Coryphospingus pileatus)
- White-lined tanager (Tachyphonus rufus)
- Silver-beaked tanager (Ramphocelus carbo)
- Lined seedeater (Sporophila lineola)
- Rusty-collared seedeater (Sporophila collaris) (A)
- Yellow-bellied seedeater (Sporophila nigricollis)
- Dubois's seedeater (Sporophila ardesiaca) (EB)(A)
- Double-collared seedeater (Sporophila caerulescens)
- White-throated seedeater (Sporophila albogularis) (EB)
- White-bellied seedeater (Sporophila leucoptera)
- Copper seedeater (Sporophila bouvreuil)
- Chestnut seedeater (Sporophila cinnamomea)
- Chestnut-bellied seed-finch (Sporophila angolensis)
- Orange-headed tanager (Thlypopsis sordida)
- Chestnut-vented conebill (Conirostrum speciosum)
- Bicoloured conebill (Conirostrum bicolor)
- Saffron finch (Sicalis flaveola)
- Orange-fronted yellow finch (Sicalis columbiana)
- Grassland yellow finch (Sicalis luteola)
- Shrike-like tanager (Neothraupis fasciata)
- Black-faced tanager (Schistochlamys melanopis)
- Cinnamon tanager (Schistochlamys ruficapillus) (EB)
- Red-cowled cardinal (Paroaria dominicana) (EB)
- Sayaca tanager (Thraupis sayaca)
- Palm tanager (Thraupis palmarum)
- Burnished-buff tanager (Stilpnia cayana)
- Red-necked tanager (Tangara cyanocephala)
- Gilt-edged tanager (Tangara cyanoventris) (EB)

== Donacobiuses ==
Order: Passeriformes Family: Donacobiidae

- Black-capped donacobius (Donacobius atricapilla)

== Swallows and martins ==
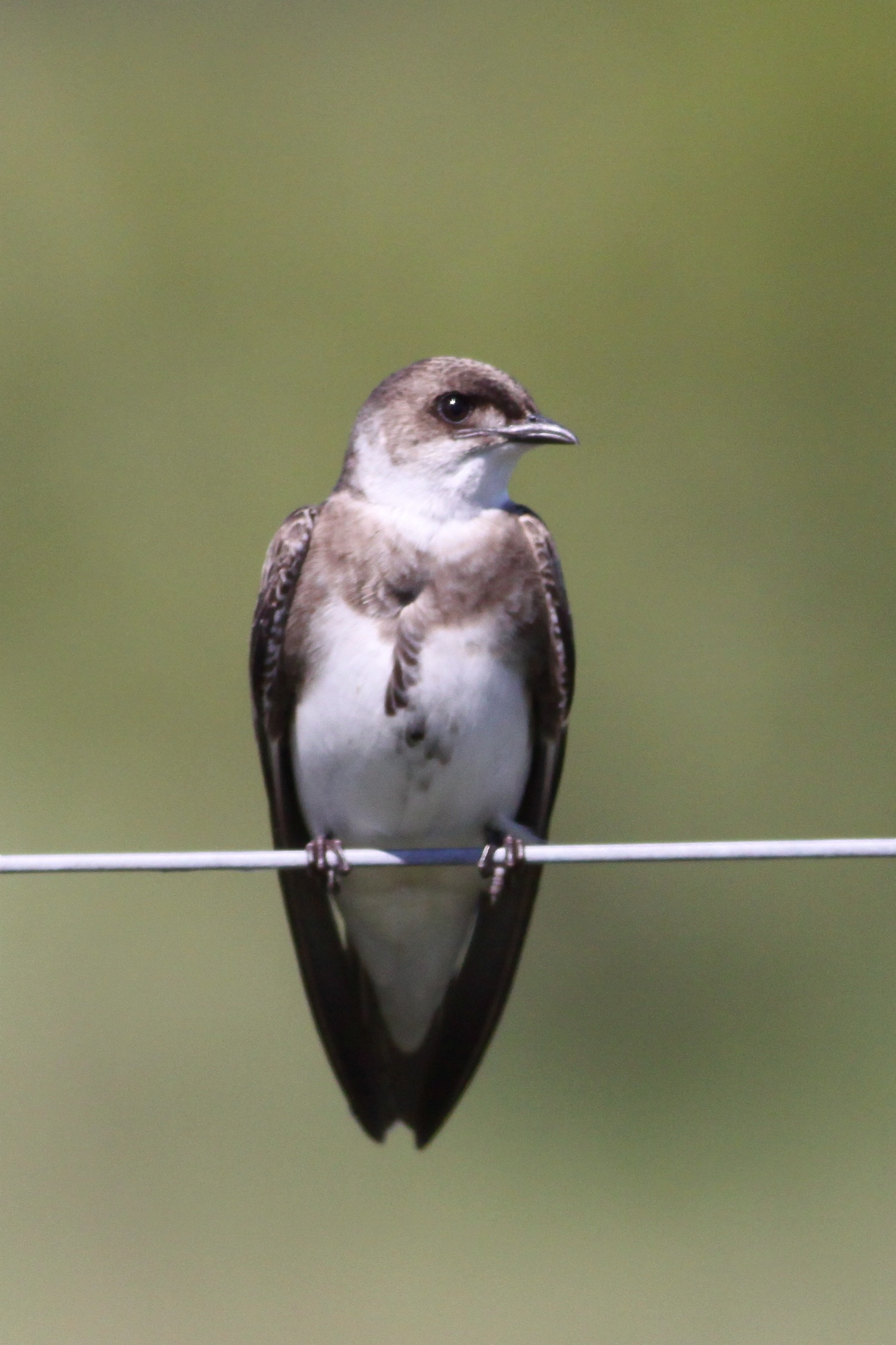
Brown-chested martin

Order: Passeriformes Family: Hirundinidae

- Blue-and-white swallow (Pygochelidon cyanoleuca)
- Southern rough-winged swallow (Stelgidopteryx ruficollis)
- Brown-chested martin (Progne tapera)
- Purple martin (Progne subis)
- Grey-breasted martin (Progne chalybea)
- White-winged swallow (Tachycineta albiventer)
- White-rumped swallow (Tachycineta leucorrhoa)
- Barn swallow (Hirundo rustica)
- Cliff swallow (Petrochelidon pyrrhonota)

== Wrens ==
Order: Passeriformes Family: Troglodytidae

- Southern house wren (Troglodytes musculus)
- Moustached wren (Pheugopedius genibarbis)
- Long-billed wren (Cantorchilus longirostris) (EB)

== Gnatcatchers and gnatwrens ==
Order: Passeriformes Family: Polioptilidae

- Tropical gnatcatcher (Polioptila plumbea)

== Mockingbirds, thrashers, and allies ==
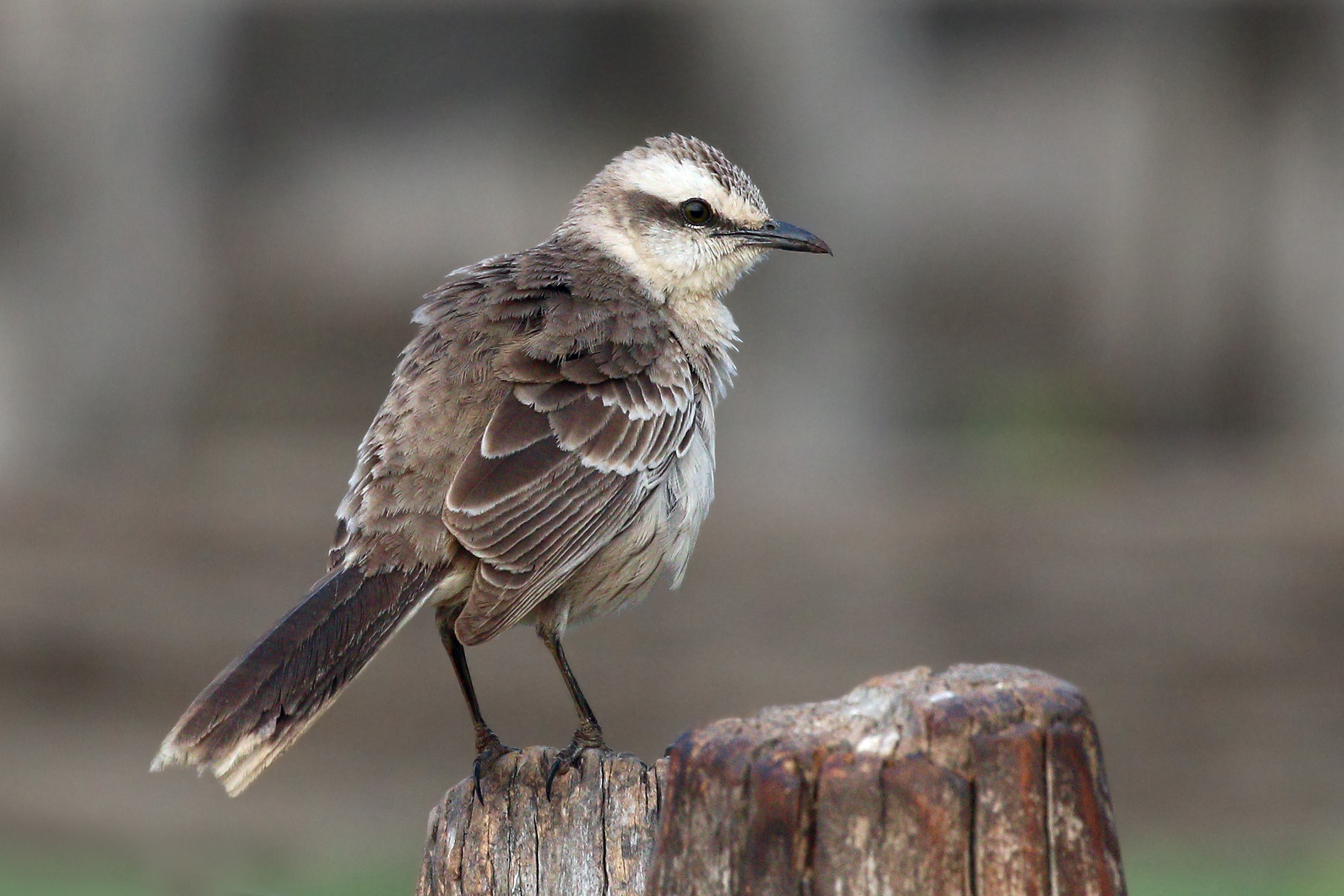
Chalk-browed mockingbird

Order: Passeriformes Family: Mimidae

- Chalk-browed mockingbird (Mimus saturninus)
- Tropical mockingbird (Mimus gilvus)

== Thrushes ==
Order: Passeriformes Family: Turdidae

- Pale-breasted thrush (Turdus leucomelas)
- Rufous-bellied thrush (Turdus rufiventris)
- Creamy-bellied thrush (Turdus amaurochalinus)
