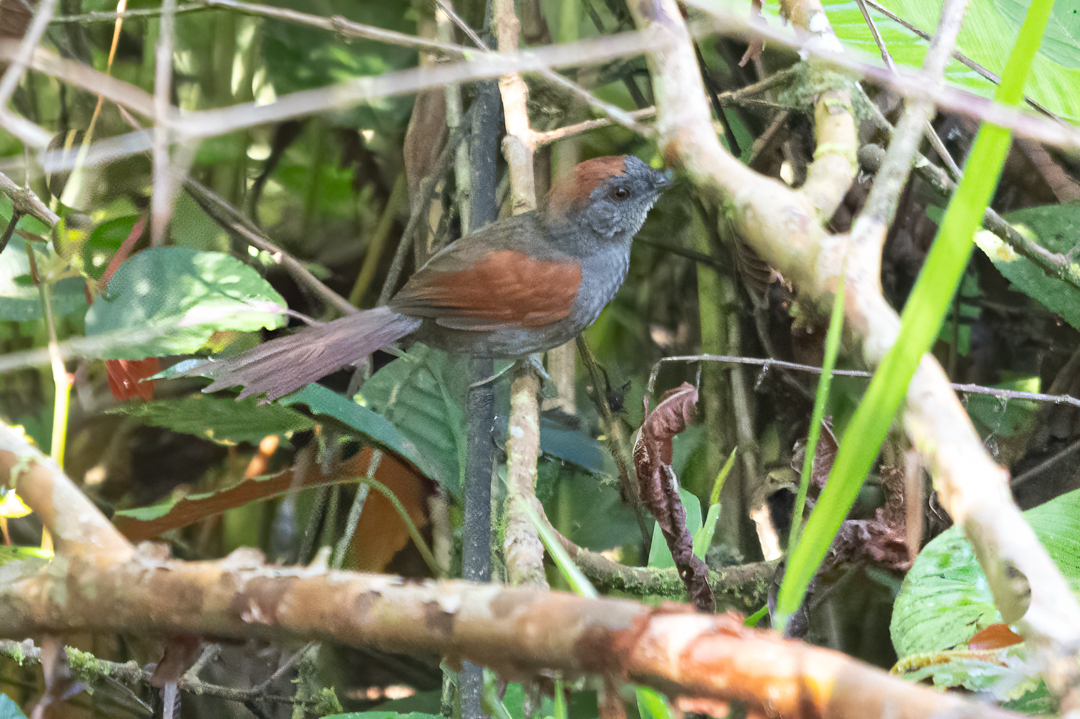

Conservation status
- Least Concern (IUCN 3.1)

Scientific classification
- Kingdom: Animalia
- Phylum: Chordata
- Class: Aves
- Order: Passeriformes
- Family: Furnariidae
- Genus: Synallaxis
- Species: S. moesta

Binomial name
- Synallaxis moesta Sclater, PL, 1856

= Dusky spinetail =

Species of bird

The dusky spinetail (Synallaxis moesta) is a species of bird in the Furnariinae subfamily of the ovenbird family Furnariidae. It is found in Colombia, Ecuador, and Peru.

== Taxonomy and systematics ==
The dusky spinetail has three subspecies, the nominate S. m. moesta (Sclater, PL, 1856), S. m. brunneicaudalis (Sclater, PL, 1858), and S. m. obscura (Chapman, 1914).

In the early twentieth century, subspecies S. m. brunneicaudalis was treated as a separate species but since then has had its present placement. Genetic data published in 2011 supported that the dusky spinetail, Cabanis's spinetail (S. cabanisi), and McConnell's spinetail (S. macconnelli) form a monophyletic group. However, data published in 2013 has evidence that the dusky spinetail might be more closely related to the rufous-capped spinetail (S. ruficapilla).

== Description ==
The dusky spinetail is 15.5 to 17 cm (6.1 to 6.7 in) long and weighs 20 to 25 g (0.71 to 0.88 oz). It is one of the darkest of the Synallaxis spinetails. The sexes have the same plumage. Adults of the nominate subspecies have a dark sooty-gray face. Their forcrown is blackish gray, their hindcrown dark chestnut, their back dark sooty brownish, and their rump and uppertail coverts a slightly lighter sooty brownish. Their wings are dark chestnut with fuscous tips on the flight feathers. Their tail is dark chestnut; it is graduated and the feathers have pointed tips. Their chin is blackish gray with paler feather shafts, giving a frosted appearance. Their underparts are mostly dark sooty brownish with slightly browner flanks. Their iris is rufous to brown, their maxilla black to slate, their mandible blue-gray to light gray (sometimes with a dark tip), and their legs and feet greenish gray to grayish olive. Juveniles have a gray crown, dusky brownish tips on the wing coverts, a gray and white faintly barred throat, and more grayish underparts than adults. Subspecies S. m. brunneicaudalis is darker overall than the nominate, with especially darker and uniform gray underparts. S. m. obscura is even darker than brunneicaudalis, but with a browner back, tail, and underparts.

== Distribution and habitat ==
The dusky spinetail is a bird of the Andean foothills. The nominate subspecies is the northernmost. It is found in central Colombia's Eastern Andes in southern Casanare Department and northwestern Meta Department. Subspecies S. m. obscura is found in the Eastern Andes of southern Colombia in the departments of Caquetá and Putumayo. S. m. brunneicaudalis is found from southeastern Nariño Department in far southwestern Colombia south through central Ecuador into northeastern Peru as far as northern San Martín Department.

The dusky spinetail inhabits the edges of several forest types, including riparian and tropical evergreen forests; it also occurs in secondary forest. It favors areas of dense undergrowth and is sometimes associated with bamboo thickets. In elevation it mostly ranges between 250 and 1,350 m (800 and 4,400 ft) but in Colombia can be found as high as 1,600 m (5,200 ft).

== Behavior ==
=== Movement ===
The dusky spinetail is a year-round resident throughout its range.

=== Feeding ===
The dusky spinetail's diet and foraging behavior are not well known. It is thought to feed on arthropods that it gleans from foliage and small branches, staying about 1 to 2 m (3 to 7 ft) above the ground. It is usually seen in pairs.

=== Breeding ===
The dusky spinetail's nesting season has not been defined but includes February. One nest was a ball of sticks with an entrance tube on the side placed in a thick vine tangle. Little else is known about the species' breeding biology.

=== Vocalization ===
The dusky spinetail makes "a low-pitched nasal chattering or churring, 'rha-a-a-a-a-a-a-a' "; it is not known if this is a song or a call.

== Status ==
The IUCN originally in 2004 assessed the dusky spinetail as being of Least Concern, then in 2012 as Near Threatened, and since 2021 again as of Least Concern. It has a large range and an unknown population size that is believed to be decreasing. "The primary threat to this species is accelerating deforestation in the Amazon basin. It is thought to be susceptible to fragmentation and edge effects and it is not found in heavily deforested areas." It is considered uncommon and local. It "[o]ccurs within a narrow elevational band in an altitudinal zone that is often under intense pressure from agriculture".
