= Paul Leverkühn =

German physician and ornithologist

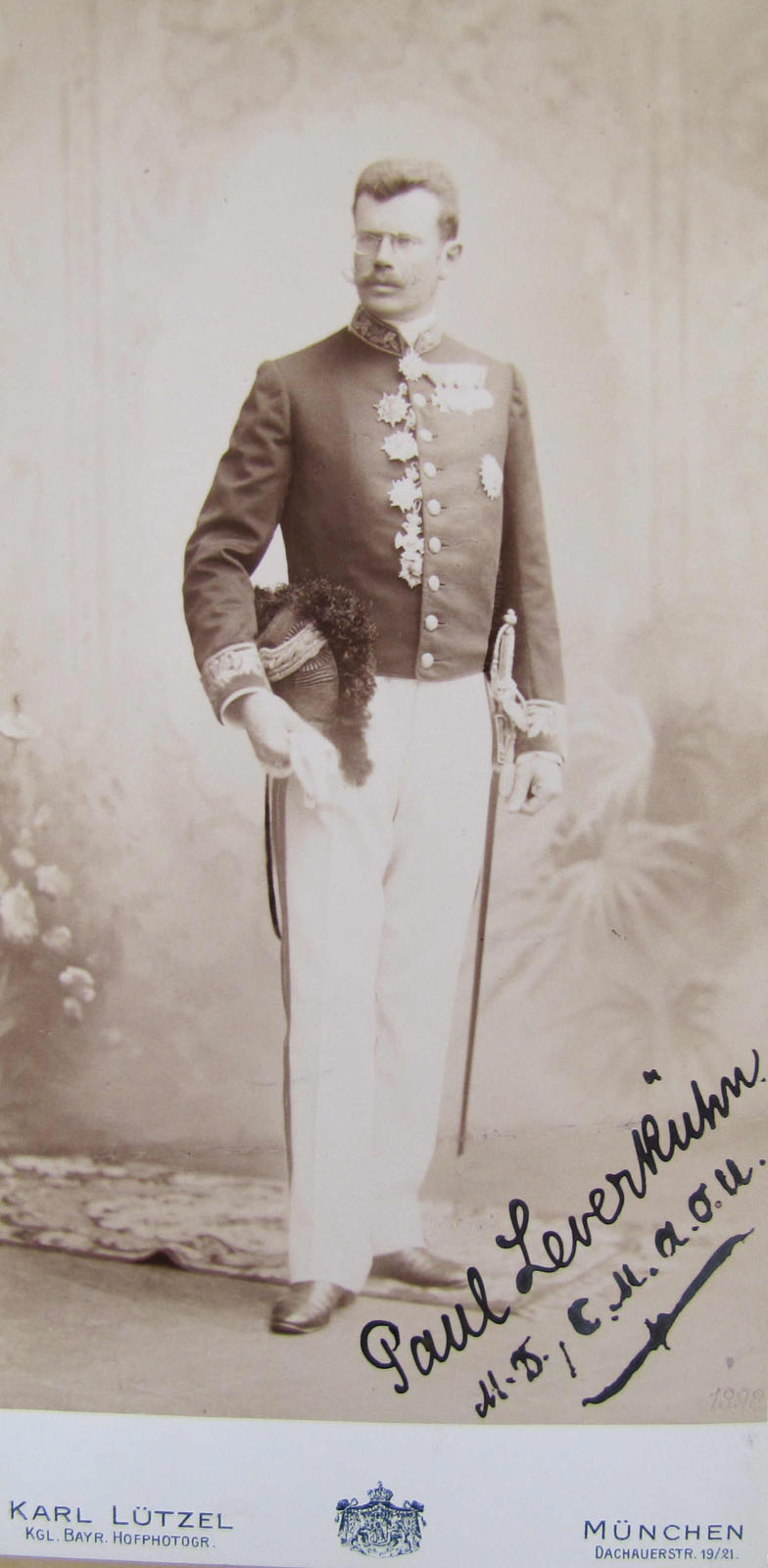
Leverkühn in 1898

Paul Georg Heinrich Martin Reinhold Leverkühn (January 12, 1867, Hanover, Germany - December 5, 1905, Sofia, Bulgaria ) was a German physician and ornithologist.

== Life ==
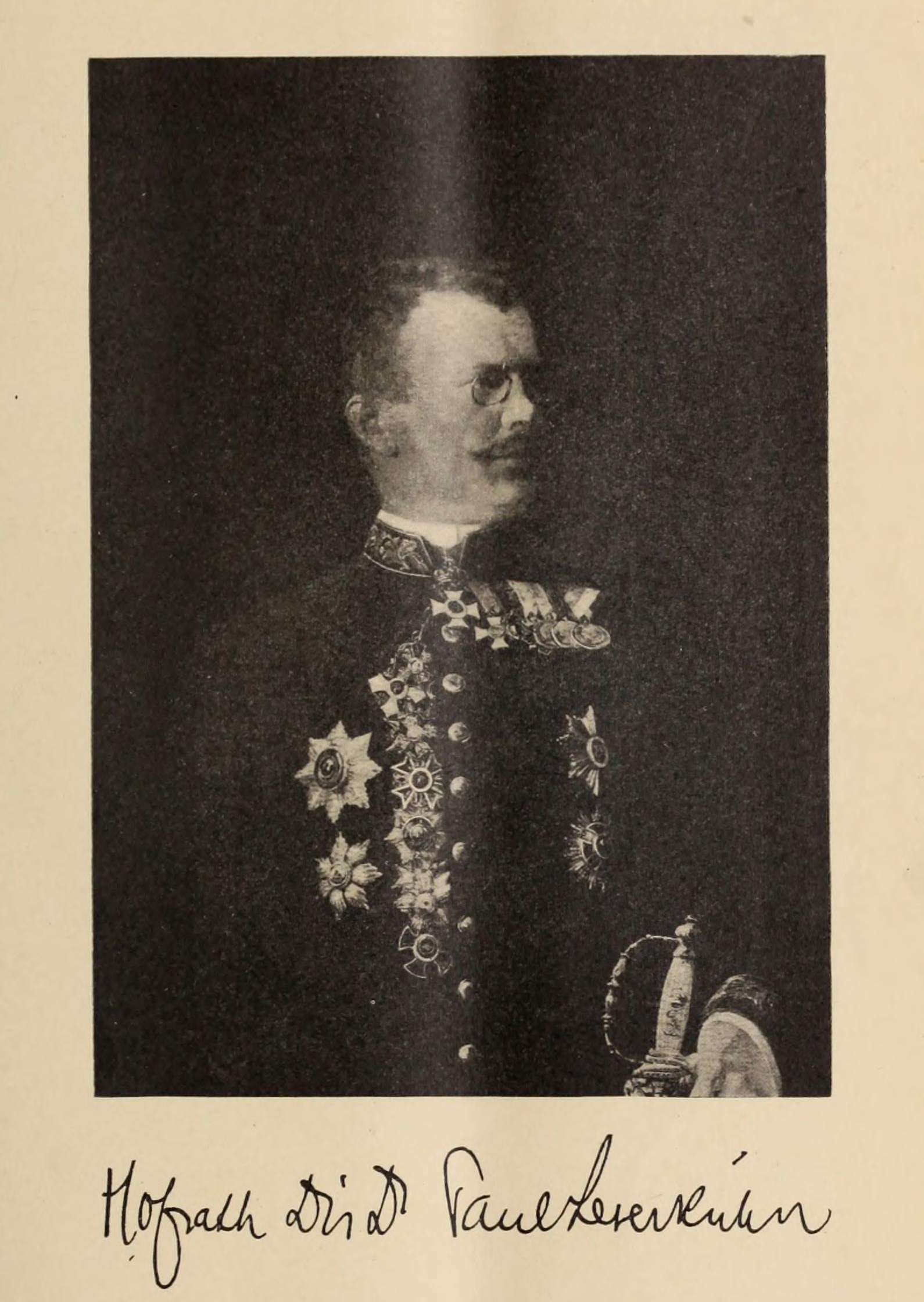

Leverkühn was born to government councilor, Carl Leverkühn, and Louise, née Grisebach, a sister of August Grisebach. The lawyer August Leverkühn was his brother.

Leverkühn studied in Hanover to complete his Lyceum and studied for a year at the Gymnasium in Clausthal. He studied medicine at the University of Kiel from 1886 to 1888 followed by studies in Strasbourg for two years and then Freiburg and Munich. He was admitted to the Dr.med. PhD. in Munich after passing the examination in February 1891. He worked briefly as a physician before being employed by Prince Ferdinand I of Bulgaria in June 1892 to maintain the newly created zoo and natural history museum in Sofia. Along with Carl Parrot (1867-1911) he founded an ornithological study circle in Bavaria in 1889. While Karl Theodor Liebe (1828-1894) initially expressed skepticism about the group, he was later impressed by it. At a young age Leverkühn was acquainted with Rudolf Blasius and his brother as well as Adolph Nehrkorn at a young age. He carefully examined literature and produced many biographies including one on the Naumann father and son.

In Sofia, Leverkühn organized the natural history museum made up of 14 buildings with two floors. It was however opened only after his death. Leverkühn published on various collection records and helped complete the publications of deceased ornithologist, Adolf Mejer. He wrote on the sandgrouse in 1889 and then on the fauna of the Pomeranian region. Leverkühn published a letter from Gustav Hartlaub, then deceased, where he defamed the Hungarian ornithologist Salamon János Petényi (1799-1855) which was something that Otto Kleinschmidt criticized in his obituary of Leverkühn. Kleinschmidt and Leverkühn had many other differences in the twelve years that they had known each other.

Leverkühn described many taxa along with Hans van Berlepsch including:

- Myrmotherula behni (Berlepsch & Leverkühn, 1890)
- Synallaxis cabanisi (Berlepsch & Leverkühn, 1890)
- Myiarchus tyrannulus bahiae (Berlepsch & Leverkühn, 1890)
- Patagioenas subvinacea bogotensis (Berlepsch & Leverkühn, 1890)
- Xiphorhynchus ocellatus lineatocapilla (Berlepsch & Leverkühn, 1890)
- Sturnella loyca falklandica (Leverkühn, 1889)

In 1905 Leverkühn died of typhus. In execution of his will, his body was moved to Gotha to be cremated there, after a ceremony in the German Protestant Church in Sofia.

== Works ==
- Ueber Farbenvarietäten bei Vögeln. Aus den Museen in Hannover, Hamburg und Kopenhagen. In: Journal für Ornithologie. Band 35, Nr. 177, 1887, S. 79–86
- Der ornithologische Nachlass Adolf Mejer's. In: Journal für Ornithologie. Band 35, Nr. 178, 1887, S. 189–213
- Südamerikanische Nova aus dem Kieler Museum. In: Journal für Ornithologie. Band 37, Nr. 185, 1889, S. 101–109
- Die Legende vom Stieglitz. In: Ornithologische Monatsschrift. Band 15, 1890, S. 278–281.
- (with Hans von Berlepsch) Studien über einige südamerikanische Vögel nebst Beschreibungen neuer Arten. In: Ornis. Band 6, Nr. 1, 1890, S. 1–32
- Biographisches über die drei Naumanns und Bibliographisches über ihre Werke nebst den Vorreden zur zweiten Auflage der Naturgeschichte der Vögel Deutschlands. R. Friedländer und Sohn, Berlin 1891.
- Baldamus, Nachruf von P.Leverkühn. In: Ornithologische Monatsschrift. Band 18, Nr. 12, 1893, S. 472–475.
- [On bird protection in England] - Reprint:
  - Vogelschutz in England. In: Ornithologische Monatsschrift. Band 19, 1894, pp. 15–29, 45–53, 82–88, 123–129, 165–175, 199–202, 228–233, 257–262, 291–297, 308–312, 341–346
- Über das Brutgeschäft der Crotophagiden. In: Journal für Ornithologie. Band 42, Nr. 1, 1894, pp. 44–80.
- (with Carlo Ettore Arrigoni degli Oddi): Die ornithologische Litteratur Italiens während der Jahre 1891 bis 1893. In: Journal für Ornithologie. Band 42, Nr. 3, 1894, pp. 280–290.
- Zur Erinnerung an Dr. Gustav Hartlaub. In: Journal für Ornithologie. Band 49, Nr. 3, 1897, pp. 337–359 doi:10.1007/BF02208479

== Other sources ==
- Rolf Schoppe: Die Vogelwelt des Kreises Hildesheim. Georg Olms AG, Hildesheim 2006, ISBN 978-3-487-13110-8.
- Hermann Hocke: Paul Leverkühn . In: Zeitschrift für Oologie und Ornithologie. Band 15, Nr. 9, 1905, S. 129–130 ).
- Ernst Otto Wilhelm Taschenberg: Hofrat Paul Leverkühn †. In: Leopoldina. Band 41, Nr. 12, 1905, S. 109–111 .
- Carl Richard Hennicke: Paul Leverkühn † (with Schwarzbild-Tafel IX). In: Ornithologische Monatsschrift. Band 31, Nr. 4, 1906, S. 164–167.
- Karl Leopold Theodor Liebe: Leverkühns Ornithologischer Lesezirkel. In: Ornithologische Monatsschrift. Band 15, Nr. 14, 1890, S. 389–390
- Carl Parrot: Bericht. In: Ornithologische Monatsschrift. Band 15, Nr. 14, 1890, S. 390–393
