= August Wilhelm Heinrich Blasius =

German ornithologist (1845–1912)

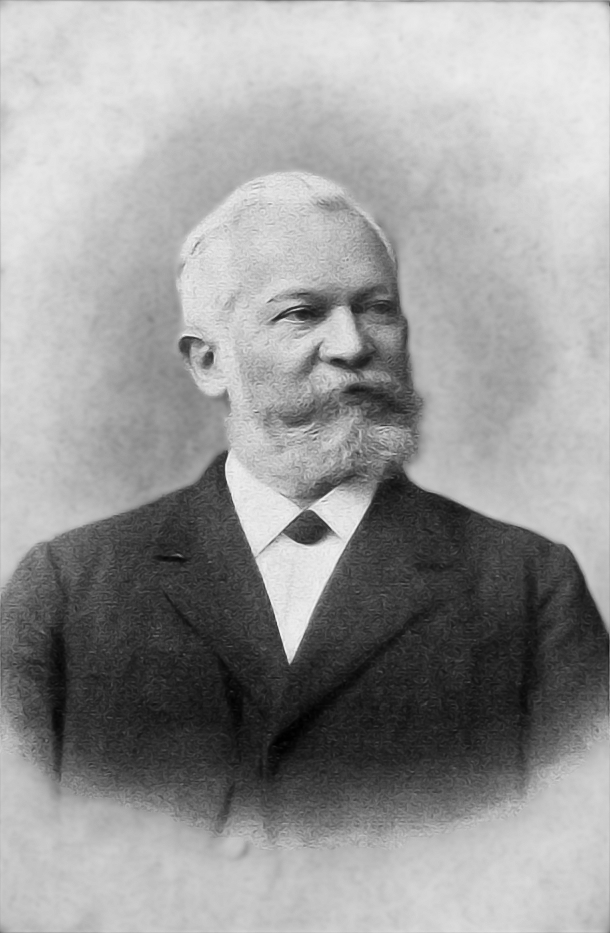
August Wilhelm Heinrich Blasius

August Wilhelm Heinrich Blasius (5 July 1845 in Braunschweig – 31 May 1912 in Braunschweig) was a German ornithologist.

Blasius belonged to a family of scientists: his father was the ornithologist Johann Heinrich Blasius (1809-1870) and his brother was the ornithologist Rudolf Heinrich Paul Blasius (1842-1907).

In 1871 he became a professor of zoology and botany at the Braunschweig University of Technology. He also served as director of its natural history museum and botanical gardens. He was a member of the council for the Deutsche Ornithologen-Gesellschaft (German Ornithological Society).

== Selected writings ==
- Beiträge zur Kenntniss der Vogelfauna von Borneo, 1881 (with Adolph Nehrkorn) - Contribution to the knowledge of birds from Borneo.
- Dr. Platen's ornithologische Sammlungen aus Amboina, 1882 (with Adolf Nehrkorn) - Dr. Platen's ornithological collection from Amboina.
- Über die letzten Vorkommnisse des Riesen-Alks (Alca impennis), 1883 - On the last occurrences of the great auk (Alca impennis).
- Ueber einige Vögel von Cochabamba in Bolivia, 1885 - On some birds of Cochabamba in Bolivia.
- Beiträge zur Kenntniss der Vogelfauna von Celebes, 1885 - Contribution to the knowledge of birds from the Celebes.
- Die Vögel von Gross-Sanghir, 1888 - Birds of Greater Sanghir.
- Die anthropologische litteratur Braunschweigs und der nachbargebiete, 1900 - Anthropological literature of Braunschweig and neighboring areas.
