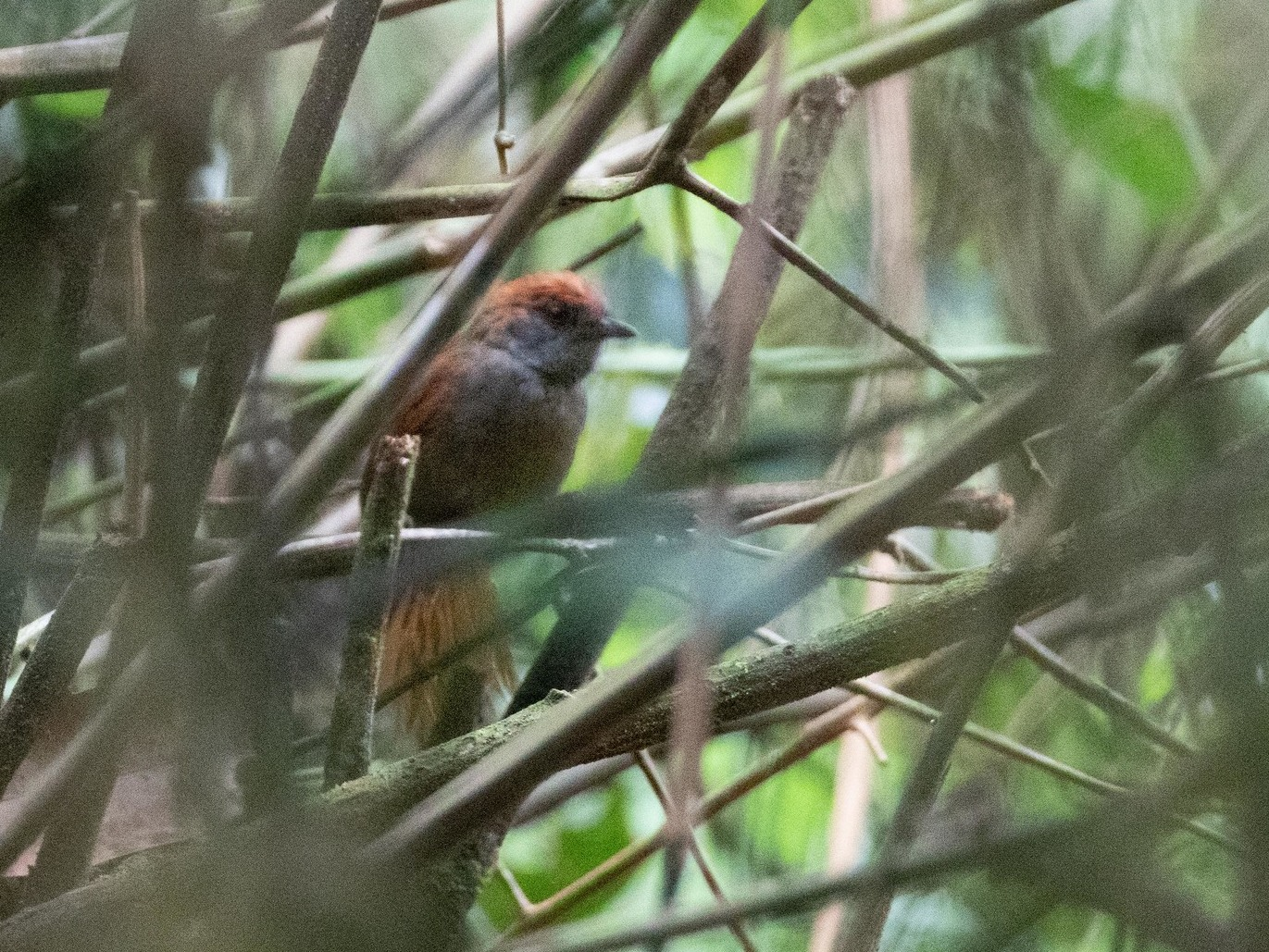

Conservation status
- Least Concern (IUCN 3.1)

Scientific classification
- Kingdom: Animalia
- Phylum: Chordata
- Class: Aves
- Order: Passeriformes
- Family: Furnariidae
- Genus: Synallaxis
- Species: S. cabanisi

Binomial name
- Synallaxis cabanisi Berlepsch & Leverkühn, 1890

= Cabanis's spinetail =

Species of bird

Cabanis's spinetail (Synallaxis cabanisi) is a species of bird in the Furnariinae subfamily of the ovenbird family Furnariidae. It is found in Brazil, Bolivia, and Peru.

== Taxonomy and systematics ==
Cabanis's spinetail has two subspecies, the nominate S. c. cabanisi (Berlepsch & Leverkühn, 1890) and S. c. fulviventris (Chapman, 1924).

Well into the twentieth century what is now McConnell's spinetail (S. macconnelli) was treated as conspecific with Cabanis's spinetail. Genetic data published in 2011 supported that Cabanis's spinetail, McConnell's spinetail, and the dusky spinetail (S. moesta) form a monophyletic group. However, data published in 2013 has evidence that the dusky spinetail might instead be more closely related to the rufous-capped spinetail (S. ruficapilla).

The English name and specific epithet of Cabanis's spinetail commemorate the German ornithologist Jean Louis Cabanis.

== Description ==
Cabanis's spinetail is 16 to 18 cm (6.3 to 7.1 in) long and weighs 16 to 24 g (0.56 to 0.85 oz). The sexes have the same plumage. Adults of the nominate subspecies have a faint ochraceous chestnut streak behind the eye and a grayish white malar region on an otherwise sooty gray-brown face. Their crown and nape are dark rufous-chestnut; their back, rump and uppertail coverts are dark brown. Their wings are mostly rufous-chestnut with fuscous brown tips on the flight feathers. Their tail is dull chestnut.It is graduated and the feathers have pointed tips. Their chin and sides of their throat are brownish-gray; the central throat feathers are blackish with grayish edges. Their underparts are mostly brownish gray with a slightly paler belly and a faint brown tinge on the flanks. Their iris is reddish-brown to brown, their maxilla is black, their mandible silver to gray (sometimes with a blackish tip), and their legs and feet are olive-gray to yellowish-gray. Juveniles have a sooty gray-brown crown and nape and more grayish underparts than the nominate. Subspecies S. c. fulviventris is smaller than the nominate, with a whiter throat and much paler underparts; their breast is tawny-olive and the center of their belly is buff.

== Distribution and habitat ==
Cabanis's spinetail mostly a bird of the eastern foothills of the Andes. The nominate subspecies is found in central and southern Peru from the Department of Huánuco south into the Department of Puno; it might also occur in the western part of the Department of Ucayali. Subspecies S. c. fulviventris is found in the northern Bolivian departments of La Paz, Beni, and Cochabamba. A disjunct population discovered in 1997 in west-central Brazil is currently (2023) assigned to the nominate subspecies but the 2013 publication suggests it belongs in the group of species related to the rufous-capped spinetail.

Cabanis's spinetail inhabits the edges of lower montane and lowland evergreen forest, secondary forest, and riparian forest. It favors dense undergrowth and often occurs in thickets of Guadua bamboo or Gynerium cane. In elevation it occurs in a narrow band between about 200 and 350 m (700 and 1,100 ft).

== Behavior ==
=== Movement ===
Cabanis's spinetail is a year-round resident throughout its range.

=== Feeding ===
The diet and foraging behavior of Cabanis's spinetail are not well known. It is thought to feed on arthropods that it gleans from foliage and small branches, staying about 1 to 2 m (3 to 7 ft) above the ground. It is usually seen in pairs.

=== Breeding ===
Nothing is known about the breeding biology of Cabanis's spinetail.

=== Vocalization ===
The vocalizations of Cabanis's spinetail have not been fully evaluated. Remsen describes a "[l]ow nasal 'nyap' " made by the Peruvian and Bolivian populations, and states that it is probably a call and that the species' song has not been described. VanPerlo describes the song of the Brazilian population as a "hurried, chattered 'tjetjetjetjet--' " and its call a "low 'zic' ".

== Status ==
The IUCN originally in 2004 assessed Cabanis's spinetail as being of Least Concern, then in 2012 as Near Threatened, and since 2021 again as of Least Concern. It has a large range and an unknown population size that is believed to be decreasing. "The primary threat to this species is accelerating deforestation in the Amazon Basin, as habitat is converted for cattle pastures and agricultural fields." It is poorly known and considered "[u]ncommon to fairly common, but local in distribution".
