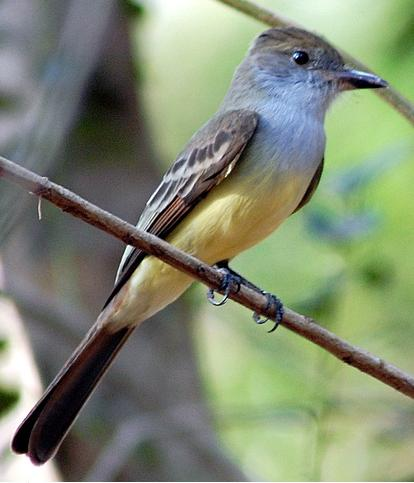
- At Piraju, São Paulo State, Brazil

Conservation status
- Least Concern (IUCN 3.1)

Scientific classification
- Kingdom: Animalia
- Phylum: Chordata
- Class: Aves
- Order: Passeriformes
- Family: Tyrannidae
- Genus: Myiarchus
- Species: M. tyrannulus

Binomial name
- Myiarchus tyrannulus (Statius Müller, 1776)

= Brown-crested flycatcher =

Species of bird

The brown-crested flycatcher (Myiarchus tyrannulus) is a passerine bird in the tyrant flycatcher family Tyrannidae. It is found from the southwestern United States south through Mexico and Central America to Costa Rica; on Aruba, Bonaire, Curaçao, Trinidad, and Tobago; and in every mainland South American country except Chile and possibly Ecuador.

== Taxonomy and systematics ==
The brown-crested flycatcher has a complicated taxonomic history. Its formal description is credited to Statius Müller in his 1776 supplement to earlier work by Carl Linnaeus and Martinus Houttuyn. He coined the binomial Muscicapa tyrannulus, placing it in the Old World flycatcher family.

As of 2025 the brown-crested flycatcher has these seven subspecies:

- M. t. magister Ridgway, 1884
- M. t. cooperi Baird, SF, 1858
- M. t. cozumelae Parkes, 1982
- M. t. insularum Bond, J, 1936
- M. t. brachyurus Ridgway, 1887
- M. t. tyrannulus (Statius Müller, 1776)
- M. t. bahiae Berlepsch & Leverkühn, 1890

Subspecies M. t. magister was originally named M. mexicanus magister. Subspecies M. t. cooperi and M. t. brachyurus were both originally described as full species in genus Myiarchus. M. t. bahiae was originally named M. t. chlorepiscius.

Prior to the 1980s the American Ornithological Society (AOS) treated M. t. magister, M. t. cooperi, M. t. cozumelae, and M. t. insularum as a species, M. magister, called "Wied's crested flycatcher". The AOS now treats them as the "magister group" within M. tyrannulus. It further suggests that M. t. cooperi, M. t. cozumelae, and M. t. insularum should form their own "cooperi group" separate from M. t. magister. It treats M. t. tyrannulus and M. t. bahiae as the "tyrannulus group" and treats M. t. brachyurus as its own group. The Clements taxonomy follows the AOS and its suggestion with four groups within the species: "brown-crested flycatcher (Arizona)" (M. t. magister), "brown-crested flycatcher (Cooper's)" (M. t. cooperi, M. t. cozumelae, and M. t. insularum), "brown-crested flycatcher (Ometepe)" (M. t. brachyurus), and "brown-crested flycatcher (South American)" (M. t. tyrannulus and M. t. bahiae).

In addition, what is now the Grenada flycatcher (M. nugator) appears to belong within M. tyrannulus.

The subspecies are weakly differentiated and there are intermediate forms between some pairs of subspecies where their ranges meet or overlap.

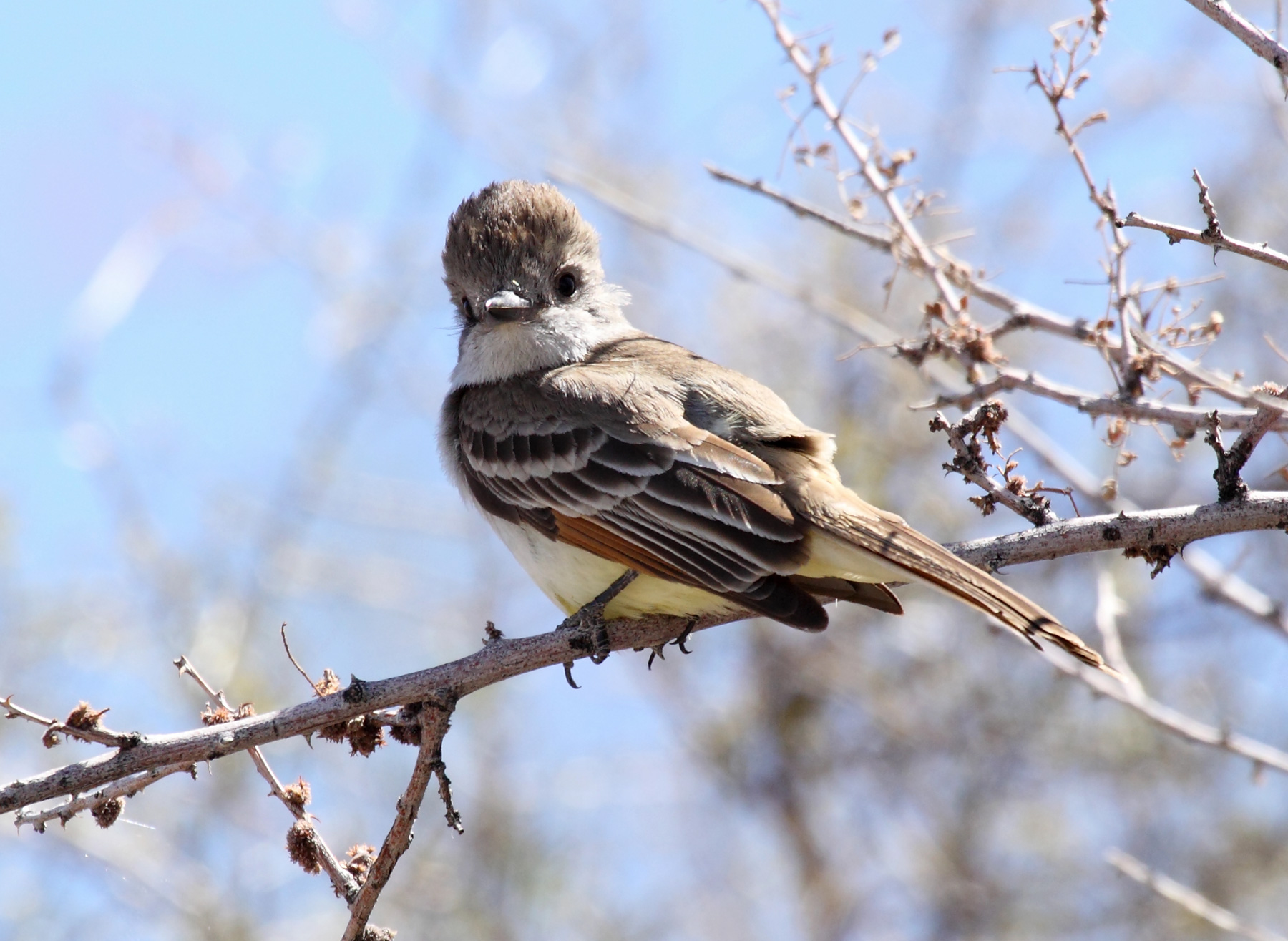
Tucson, Arizona

== Description ==
The brown-crested flycatcher is 18 to 23 cm (7.1 to 9.1 in) long, with a general trend of larger to smaller from north to south. Subspecies M. t. magister is the largest taxon within the entire genus Myiarchus, weighing 36 to 54 g (1.3 to 1.9 oz). The other subspecies weigh 21 to 45 g (0.74 to 1.6 oz). The sexes have the same plumage. Adults of the subspecies M. t. magister and M. t. cooperi have a grayish brown crown whose feathers have darker shafts and form a bushy crest. Their upperparts are mostly light brownish gray to dark olive gray with often a rufous tinge on the uppertail coverts. Their face is otherwise medium gray. Their wings are mostly dark grayish brown to brownish black with rufous edges on all but the outermost primaries and white, pale lemon, or grayish edges on the secondaries. The wing's greater and median coverts have pale grayish brown to brownish white tips that show as two wing bars. Their tail is dark grayish brown to brownish black with rufous inner webs on all but the inner pair of feathers. Their throat and upper breast are light gray that is slightly lighter on the throat. Their lower breast, flanks, and belly are bright yellow with a light gray wash on the sides and their undertail coverts are light yellow.

The other subspecies of the brown-crested flycatcher differ from M. t. magister and M. t. cooperi and each other thus:

- M. t. cozumelae: darker and browner crown, upperparts, and uppertail coverts; darker rufous on tail and paler belly
- M. t. insularum darker upperparts and slightly darker underparts
- M. t. brachyurus: smallest of the North and Central American subspecies; more rufous on tail feathers
- M. t. tyrannulus: similar to M. t. magister and M. t. cooperi
- M. t. bahiae: similar to M. t. magister and M. t. cooperi

Most individuals have a brown iris, a black bill sometimes with a paler base, and black legs and feet.

== Distribution and habitat ==
The brown-crested flycatcher's subspecies have disjunct distributions, both within Central and South America and between them. Its range skirts most of the Amazon Basin. The subspecies are found thus:

- M. t. magister: from southeastern California, southern Nevada and southwestern Utah, south-central and southeastern Arizona, and southwestern New Mexico in the United States south through western Mexico all the way to eastern Oaxaca; also Tres Marias Islands
- M. t. cooperi: from southern Texas in the U.S. south through eastern Mexico including the Yucatán Peninsula and through Belize and northern Guatemala into northern Honduras
- M. t. cozumelae: Cozumel Island
- M. t. insularum: the Bay Islands off Honduras' Caribbean coast
- M. t. brachyurus: western Nicaragua and northwestern Costa Rica
- M. t. tyrannulus: Aruba, Bonaire, Curaçao, Trinidad, and Tobago; northern and eastern Colombia; northern and central Venezuela; the Guianas and adjacent Brazil north of the Amazon and east of the Negro River; western Brazil from Acre to western Mato Grosso do Sul; extreme southeastern Peru; northern and eastern Bolivia; western Paraguay; northern Argentina south to Córdoba and Santa Fe provinces; separately in northern Peru
- M. t. bahiae: eastern Brazil from Pará south to São Paulo state, eastern Paraguay, and northeastern Argentina's Misiones Province

The brown-crested flycatcher has occurred as a vagrant in the U.S. states of Louisiana and Florida. Sight records of M. t. tyrannulus in Ecuador lead the South American Classification Committee of the AOS to call it hypothetical in that country.

The brown-crested flycatcher inhabits quite different landscapes across its extremely large range. The common characteristic is the need for large cavities in trees or cactus for nesting. Subspecies M. t. magister primarily inhabits riparian zones and also relatively high elevation desert with saguaro and other large cactus. It occurs less frequently in mesquite desert, thorn forest, pine-oak woodlands, and deciduous woodlands. In elevation it ranges from sea level to 2,000 m (6,600 ft). In most of its range M. t. cooperi inhabits the same range of landscapes, but is found somewhat more evenly across the various types. From southern Mexico south it also occurs in tropical deciduous forest, secondary forest, swamp forest, gallery forest, and pine woodlands. In elevation it ranges from sea level to about 1,500 m (4,900 ft).

Subspecies M. t. cozumelae inhabits dense scrubby woodland with much thorny vegetation. M. t. brachyurus inhabits more open landscapes including pastures with scattered trees, scrublands, the edges of continuous forest, and mangrove swamps. Both reach about 900 m (3,000 ft) in elevation.

In Colombia subspecies M. t. tyrannulus inhabits dryish woodlands and savanna under 1,000 m (3,300 ft) of elevation. In Venezuela it occurs in a wider variety of habitats including arid scrublands, dry to moist woodlands, gallery forest, and mangroves. There it ranges up to 1,100 m (3,600 ft) north of the Orinoco River and to 300 m (1,000 ft) south of it. In Brazil it primarily inhabits riparian areas and both open and dense woodlands. In Brazil M. t. bahiae inhabits cerrado as well as the same landscapes as tyrannulus. In Brazil both of these subspecies range from sea level to 300 m (1,000 ft). South of Brazil both inhabit savanna and dry woodland.

== Behavior ==
=== Movement ===
The brown-crested flycatcher is a partial migrant. The two northern subspecies withdraw from the U.S. and northern Mexico to winter south to northern Central America. They usually leave the U.S. by mid-August and return in May. Some other subspecies are thought to make some limited movements.

=== Feeding ===
The brown-crested flycatcher feeds almost exclusively on arthropods during the breeding season and occasionally includes small vertebrates and fruit in its diet. In the non-breeding season it feeds on a more even mix of arthropods and fruit. It takes fruit and most of its arthropod prey with sallies from a perch to grab it from vegetation. It less often takes insects in mid-air and occasionally from the ground.

=== Breeding ===
The brown-crested flycatcher breeds in the local spring and summer. It nests in cavities, either natural or those excavated by woodpeckers, in trees and large cacti. The nest itself is made from a variety of plant fibers, hair, feathers, snake skin, and anthropogenic materials like fabric and plastic. The clutch can range up to seven eggs that are creamy buff to cream-white with darker markings highly variable in color. It is thought that females alone incubate. The incubation period and time to fledging are not known. Both parents provision nestlings but other details of parental care are not known.

=== Vocalization ===
The brown-crested flycatcher's dawn song varies somewhat among the subspecies but overall is "alternated renditions of isolated huits and complex phrases that are typically derived from combination of a whay-burg note with brief series of rapid huits". Calls vary little and include a "noisy, grating, harsh-sounding" rasp, a "brief, simple huit", a "whay-burg" that is an "introductory modified huit, followed by burst of 2–3 huits given in rapid succession", and "a slowly modulated whistle or vibrato".

== Status ==
The IUCN has assessed the short-crested flycatcher as being of Least Concern. It has an extremely large range; its population size is not known and is believed to be increasing. No immediate threats have been identified. It is considered a common nester in the U.S., where most of its habitat is in protected areas. It is considered a "fairly common resident and winter visitor" in northern Central America, common in northwestern Costa Rica, and uncommon in the Costa Rican interior. It is common in Colombia, Venezuela, and Brazil. In Peru it is a "locally fairly common resident" in the north and a "rare to uncommon austral migrant" in the southeast.
