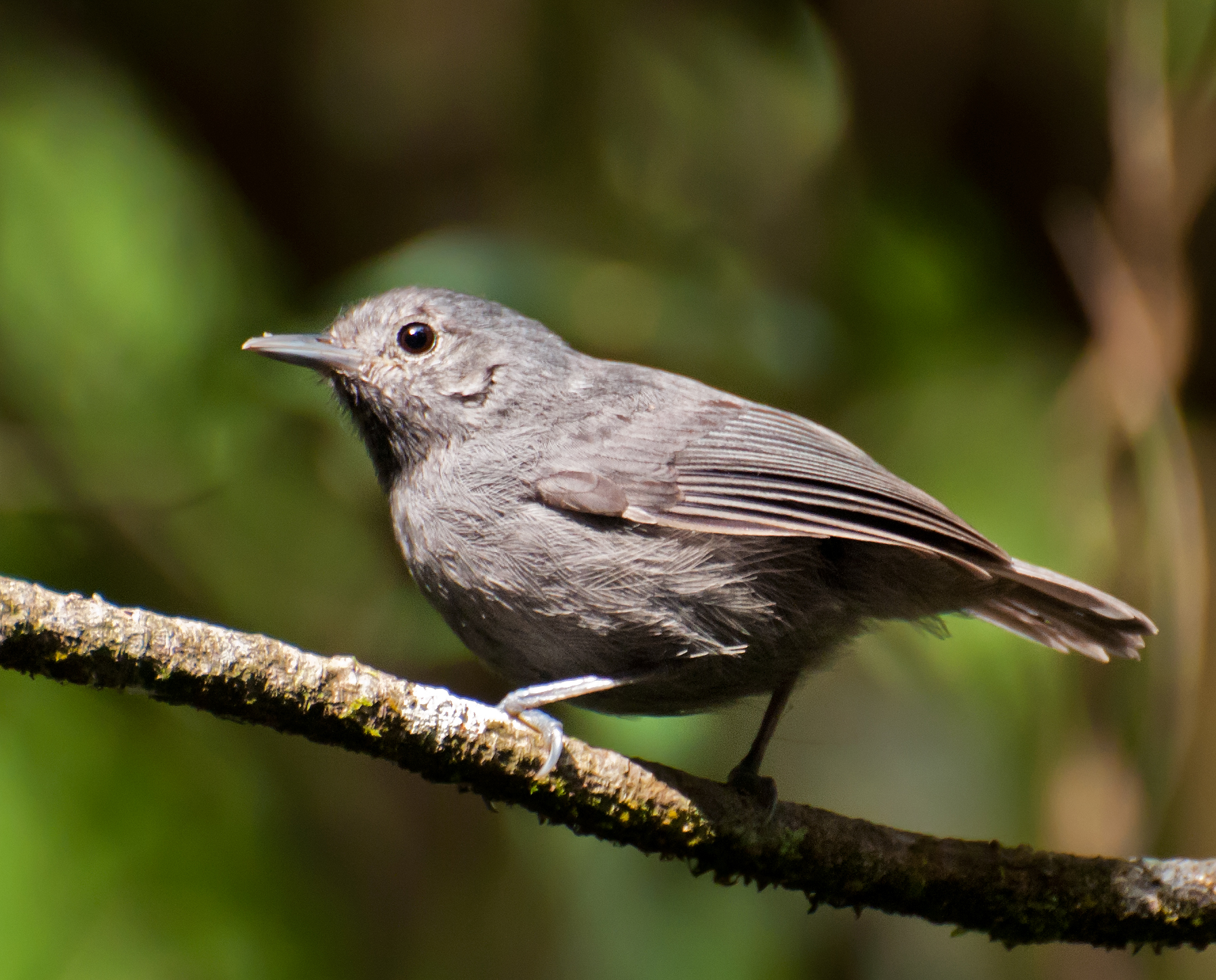
- Male in São Paulo, Brazil

Conservation status
- Least Concern (IUCN 3.1)

Scientific classification
- Kingdom: Animalia
- Phylum: Chordata
- Class: Aves
- Order: Passeriformes
- Family: Thamnophilidae
- Genus: Myrmotherula
- Species: M. unicolor

Binomial name
- Myrmotherula unicolor (Ménétriés, 1835)

= Unicolored antwren =

Species of bird

The unicolored antwren (Myrmotherula unicolor) is a species of bird in subfamily Thamnophilinae of family Thamnophilidae, the "typical antbirds". It is endemic to southeastern Brazil.

== Taxonomy and systematics ==
The unicolored antwren and the Alagoas antwren (M. snowi) were previously considered conspecific and now form a superspecies. The unicolored antwren is monotypic. The unicolored antwren, the Yungas antwren (M. grisea), the Alagoas antwren (M. snowi), and the plain-winged antwren (M. behni) appear to form a monophyletic group with similar vocalizations and habitat requirements.

== Description ==
The unicolored antwren is 9 to 10 cm (3.5 to 3.9 in) long and weighs 6.5 to 8 g (0.23 to 0.28 oz). It is a smallish bird with a short tail. Adult males are almost entirely gray, with lighter underparts than upperparts. Their throat feathers have black bases and gray tips. Adult females have olive-brown upperparts with a grayish tinge on the crown and nape and yellowish brown uppertail coverts. Their wings are dark grayish brown with reddish yellow-brown edges on the flight feathers. Their tail is reddish yellow-brown. Their throat is whitish and their underparts mostly olive-buff that is grayer on their sides and flanks. Their crissum is brownish yellow.

== Distribution and habitat ==
The unicolored antwren is a bird of the Atlantic Forest. It is found along coastal southeastern Brazil from northern Rio de Janeiro state south into northern Rio Grande do Sul. It inhabits the understorey to mid-storey of evergreen forest and mature secondary forest. In a few areas it also occurs in restinga woodlands that grow on white-sand soils. It favors dense viny understory in somewhat stunted forest with a canopy up to about 20 m (70 ft) high. In elevation it ranges from sea level to about 500 m (1,600 ft).

== Behavior ==
=== Movement ===
The unicolored antwren is believed to be a year-round resident throughout its range.

=== Feeding ===
The unicolored antwren's diet is not known in detail but is probably mostly insects and spiders. It forages singly, in pairs, or in family groups, and often as part of a mixed-species feeding flock. It feeds mostly between about 0.5 and 5 m (2 and 20 ft) above the ground, though it will feed as high as 15 m (50 ft). It actively, but methodically, seeks prey especially among vine tangles and also from leaves both live and dead, stems, and branches, mostly by reaching and stabbing. It also captures prey by hanging, hover-gleaning, and with short sallies from a perch.

=== Breeding ===
The unicolored antwren's breeding season is not known but active nests have been noted in November. The nest is a cup made from roots, dead leaves, and fungal fibers hung from a branch fork, typically within about 2 m (7 ft) of the ground. The clutch size, incubation period, time to fledging, and details of parental care are not known.

=== Vocalization ===
The unicolored antwren's song is an "irregular series of very high, sharp, drawn-out, well-separated 'Seeep' notes". Its calls include a "sharp 'wheet' ", "paired nasal notes", and "longer, flat, raspy notes".

== Status ==
The IUCN originally in 1994 assessed the unicolored antwren as Vulnerable, then in 2004 as Near Threatened, and since 2023 as being of Least Concern. It has a large range; its population size is not known and is believed to be decreasing. The main threat is habitat loss. "Virtually all lowland Atlantic forest outside protected areas has been deforested within its historical range for human encroachment, logging and conversion for agricultural purposes." It is considered uncommon across its range. It does occur in several protected areas, most of them in the northern part of its range. "More survey work is needed in order to assess the distribution and population levels of present species in [the southern] portions of its range".
