= Sittich Hans von Berlepsch =

German nobleman and conservationist

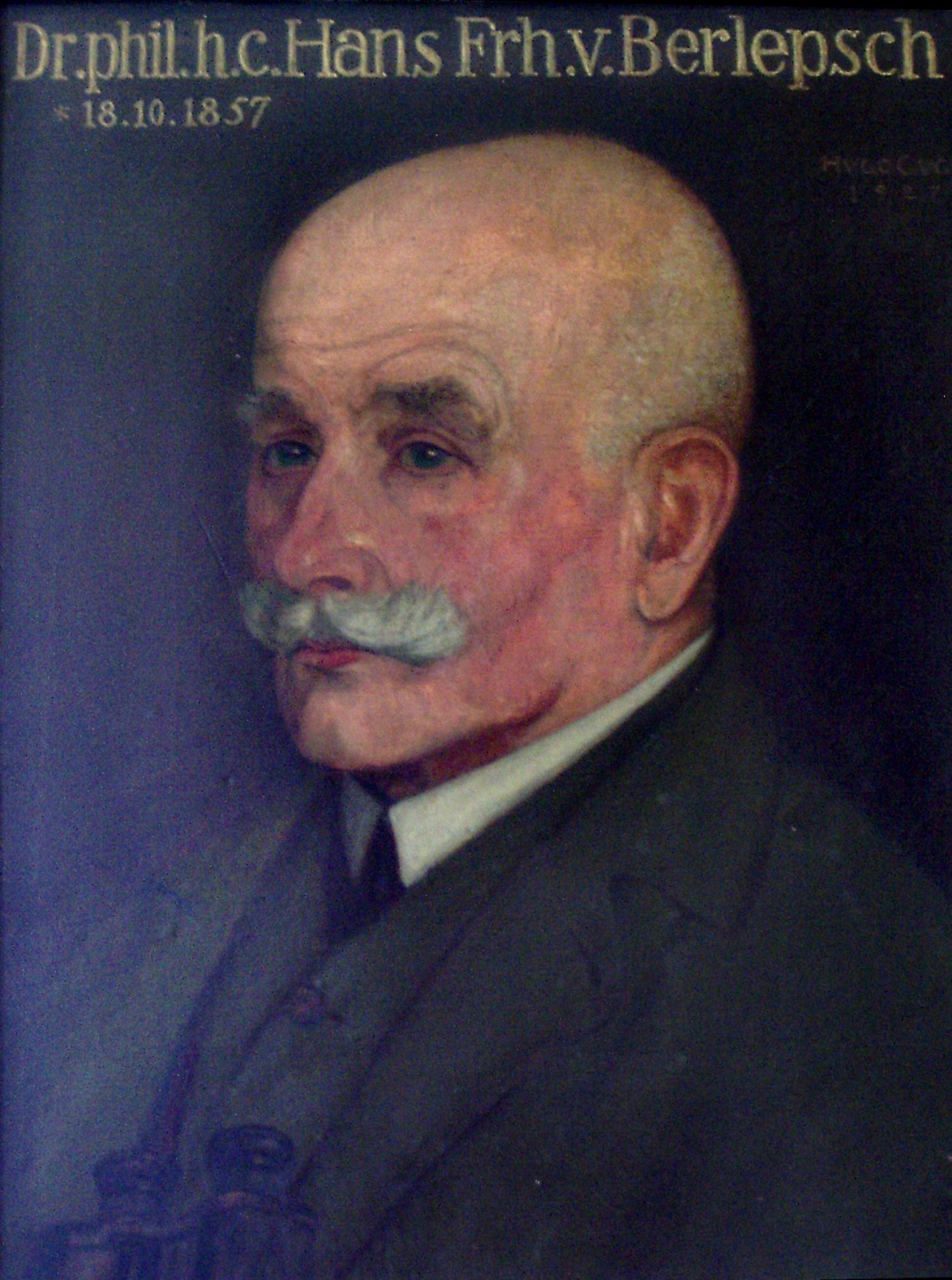

Sittich Karl Rudolf Hans von Berlepsch (18 October 1857 - 2 September 1933) was a German nobleman who took an interest in bird conservation in Germany. He introduced a wooden nest box, established an ornithological station in Seebach, and wrote a book on bird conservation in 1899. He was involved in the passing of the German bird protection act of 1908. He was a cousin of the ornithologist Hans von Berlepsch.

== Life and work ==
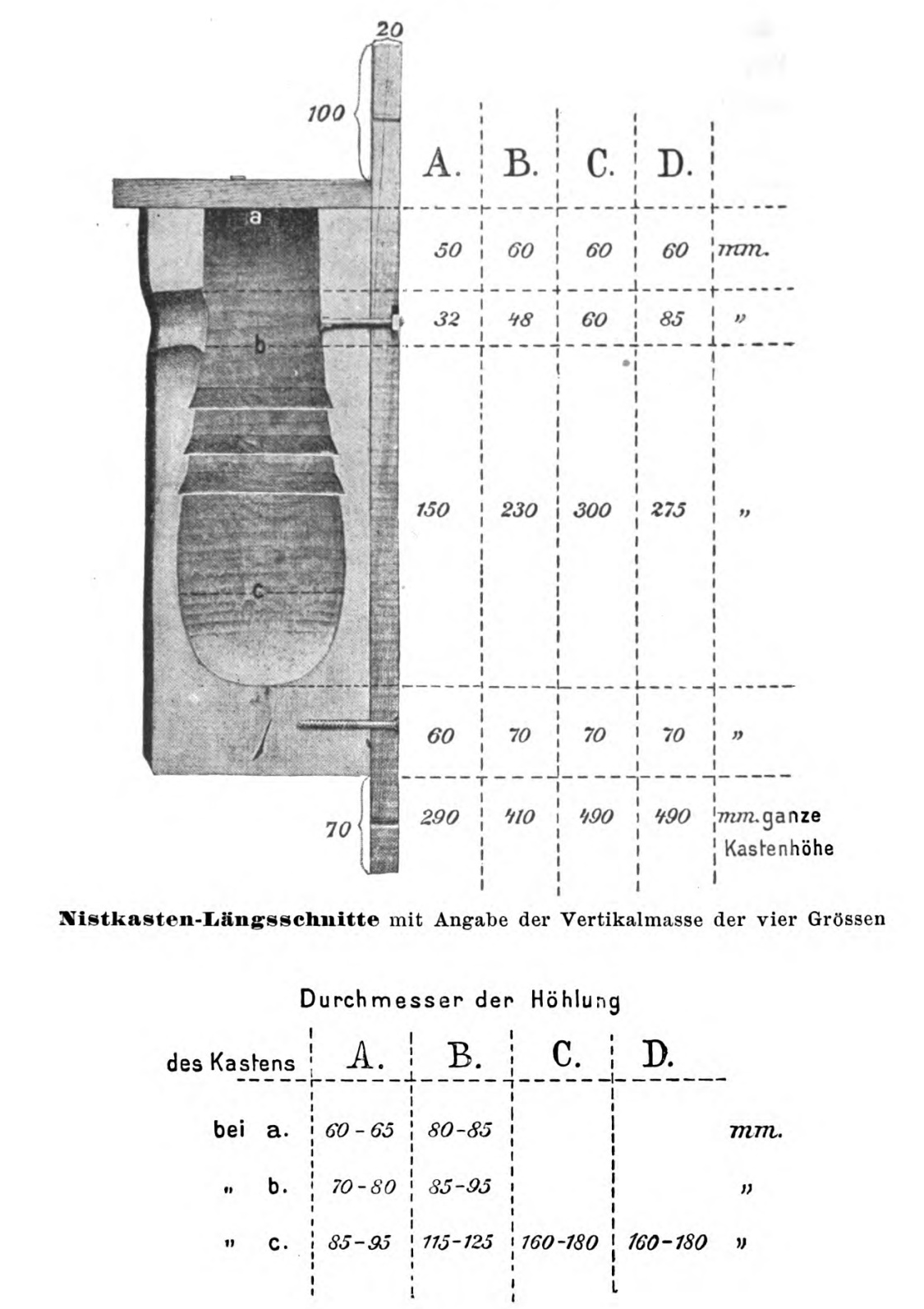
Berlepsch's nest box design

Von Berlepsch was born in Seebach near Mühlhausen in Thuringia to Rudolf Sittig Gottlob (1825–84) and Pauline née Barthels (1837–1910). August von Berlepsch was an uncle. The family coat of arms included five parakeets. Even as a young boy he was interested in birds and was an army officer from 1879 to 1905 travelling around Europe and also to Brazil. In 1908 he was a guest of Dr Alexander Koenig's expedition to Norway, Spitzbergen and Bear Island. He observed the destruction of migrating birds in Italy. In 1890 he spoke about the killing of birds in Italy at the 2nd International Ornithological Congress at Budapest. He retired in 1918 with the rank of lieutenant colonel. Returning to the Seebach Castle he introduced a wooden nests imitating a woodpecker nest hole for birds to nest. In an autobiographical note in 1922 he wrote that the nest boxes he designed were a failure as many of the birds that nested in them were unsuccessful in raising broods. He also suggested the planting of bird protection shrubs supporting these ideas in his 1899 book Der Gesamte Vogelschutz. In 1908 he established an ornithological station in Seebach which was declared as a model station for bird protection by the Prussian government. At the 1905 International Ornithological Congress at London he presented a paper on his determination of Erithacus cairii as being merely the juvenile of Erithacus tithys (this is now Phoenicurus ochruros). He was involved in protection of gulls at their breeding grounds in Memmert. He however supported the eradication of house sparrows. In 1925 the management of the Seebach station moved to Karl Mansfeld. He received an honorary doctorate from the University of Halle-Wittenberg in 1923. He is buried at Seebach.
