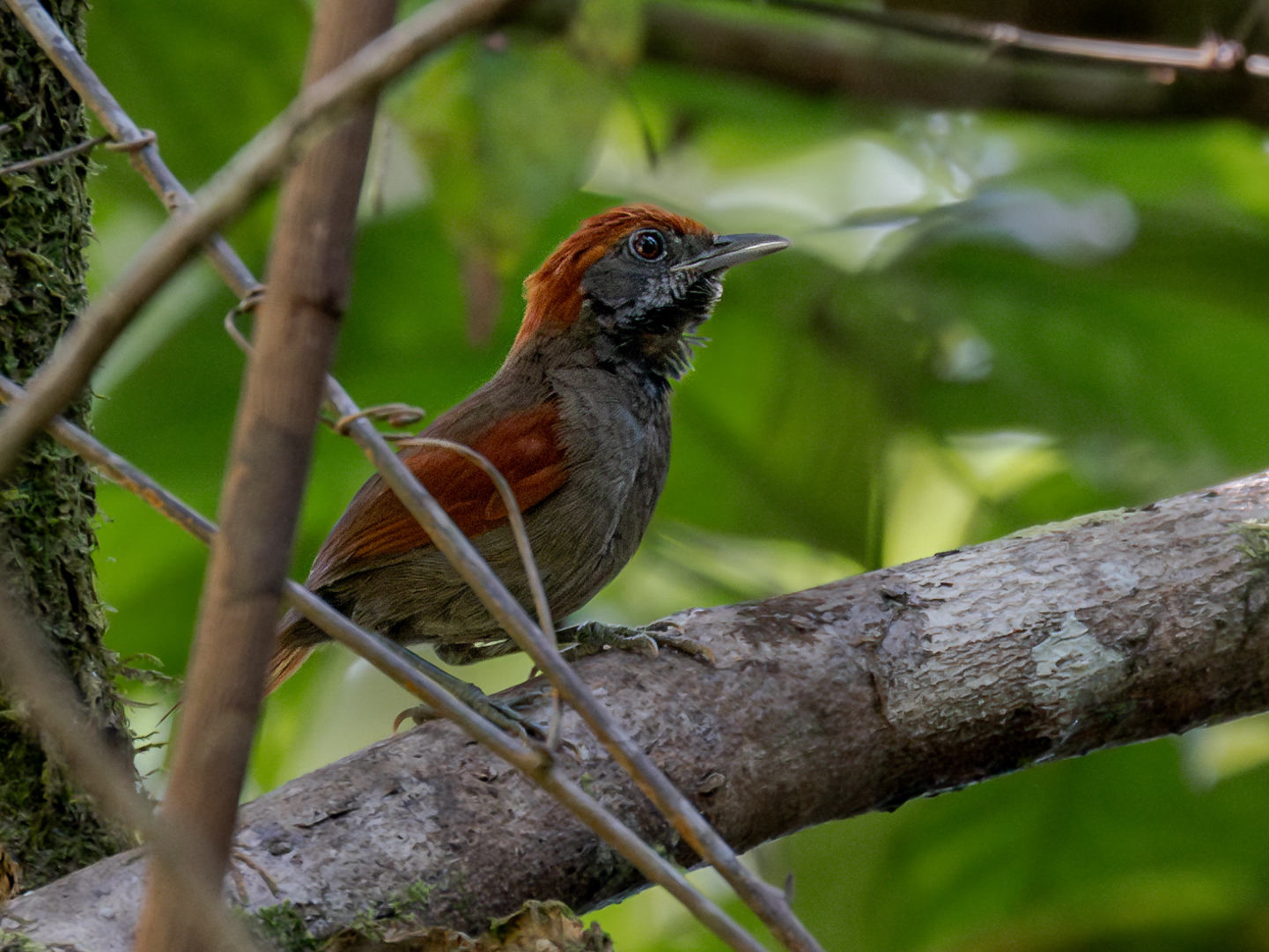

Conservation status
- Least Concern (IUCN 3.1)

Scientific classification
- Kingdom: Animalia
- Phylum: Chordata
- Class: Aves
- Order: Passeriformes
- Family: Furnariidae
- Genus: Synallaxis
- Species: S. macconnelli

Binomial name
- Synallaxis macconnelli Chubb, 1919

= McConnell's spinetail =

Species of bird

McConnell's spinetail (Synallaxis macconnelli) is a species of bird in the Furnariinae subfamily of the ovenbird family Furnariidae. It is found in Brazil, French Guiana, Guyana, Suriname, and Venezuela.

== Taxonomy and systematics ==
Well into the twentieth century McConnell's spinetail was treated as conspecific with Cabanis's spinetail (S. cabanisi). Since its recognition as a species its further taxonomy is unsettled. The International Ornithological Committee recognizes two subspecies, the nominate S. m. macconnelli (Chubb, 1919) and S. m. obscurior (Todd, 1948). BirdLife International's Handbook of the Birds of the World adds a third, S. m. yavii. The Clements taxonomy treats it as monotypic, with no subspecies.

Genetic data published in 2011 supported that McConnell's spinetail, the dusky spinetail (S. moesta), and Cabanis's spinetail (S. cabanisi) form a monophyletic group. However, data published in 2013 has evidence that the dusky spinetail might instead be more closely related to the rufous-capped spinetail (S. ruficapilla).

The specific epithet of McConnell's spinetail is misspelled with "mac" instead of "mc"; the species was named for a F. V. McConnell. By the rules of the International Code of Zoological Nomenclature the error is retained.

This article follows the two-subspecies model.

== Description ==
McConnell's spinetail is 15 to 17 cm (5.9 to 6.7 in) long and weighs 18 to 20 g (0.63 to 0.71 oz). It is one of the darker of the Synallaxis spinetails. The sexes have the same plumage. Adults of the nominate subspecies have a thin pale line behind the eye on an otherwise grayish face. Their crown and nape are dark rufous; their back, rump and upperail coverts are dark olive-brown. Their wings are mostly rufous-chestnut with fuscous brown tips on the flight feathers. Their tail is dark chestnut; it is graduated and the feathers have pointed tips. Their chin and throat feathers are blackish with grayish white edges. Their underparts are mostly brownish gray with a slightly paler belly and a faint brown tinge on the flanks. Their iris is chestnut, their bill black, and their legs and feet olive. Juveniles are slightly paler overall than adults, with a gray and white barred throat and a browner breast and belly. Subspecies S. m. obscurior is overall darker and grayer than the nominate.

== Distribution and habitat ==
McConnell's spinetail has a disjunct distribution. The nominate subspecies is found on the tepuis of southern Venezuela, far western Guyana, and extrene northwestern Brazil. Subspecies S. m. obscurior is found in the lowlands of Suriname, French Guiana, and northeastern Brazil. The species inhabits the edges of montane and lowland evergreen forest, secondary forest, and in French Guiana some riparian forest. It favors dense undergrowth. In the tepui region it occurs at elevations between 1,000 and 1,900 m (3,300 and 6,200 ft); in the east it is mostly found from near sea level to about 1,000 m (3,300 ft).

== Behavior ==
=== Movement ===
McConnell's spinetail is a year-round resident throughout its range.

=== Feeding ===
The diet and foraging behavior of McConnell's spinetail are not well known. It is thought to feed on arthropods that it gleans from foliage and small branches, staying about 1 to 2 m (3 to 7 ft) above the ground. It is usually seen in pairs.

=== Breeding ===
The nest of McConnell's spinetail is a ball of sticks with an entrance tube on the side, typically placed in a shrub about 3 to 4 m (10 to 13 ft) above the ground. Nothing else is known about the species' breeding biology.

=== Vocalization ===
The song of McConnell's spinetail is a "dry rattle, ending in a higher pitched, full-stop 'drrrrrh-Tic' ". Its call is a "short, dry rattle, like 'drrrr' ".

== Status ==
The IUCN has assessed McConnell's spinetail as being of Least Concern. It has a fairly large range; its population size is not known but is believed to be stable. No immediate threats have been identified. It is considered fairly common but local. "Evidently a true forest species which, unlike many Synallaxis spinetails, does not occur in heavily cut-over areas."
