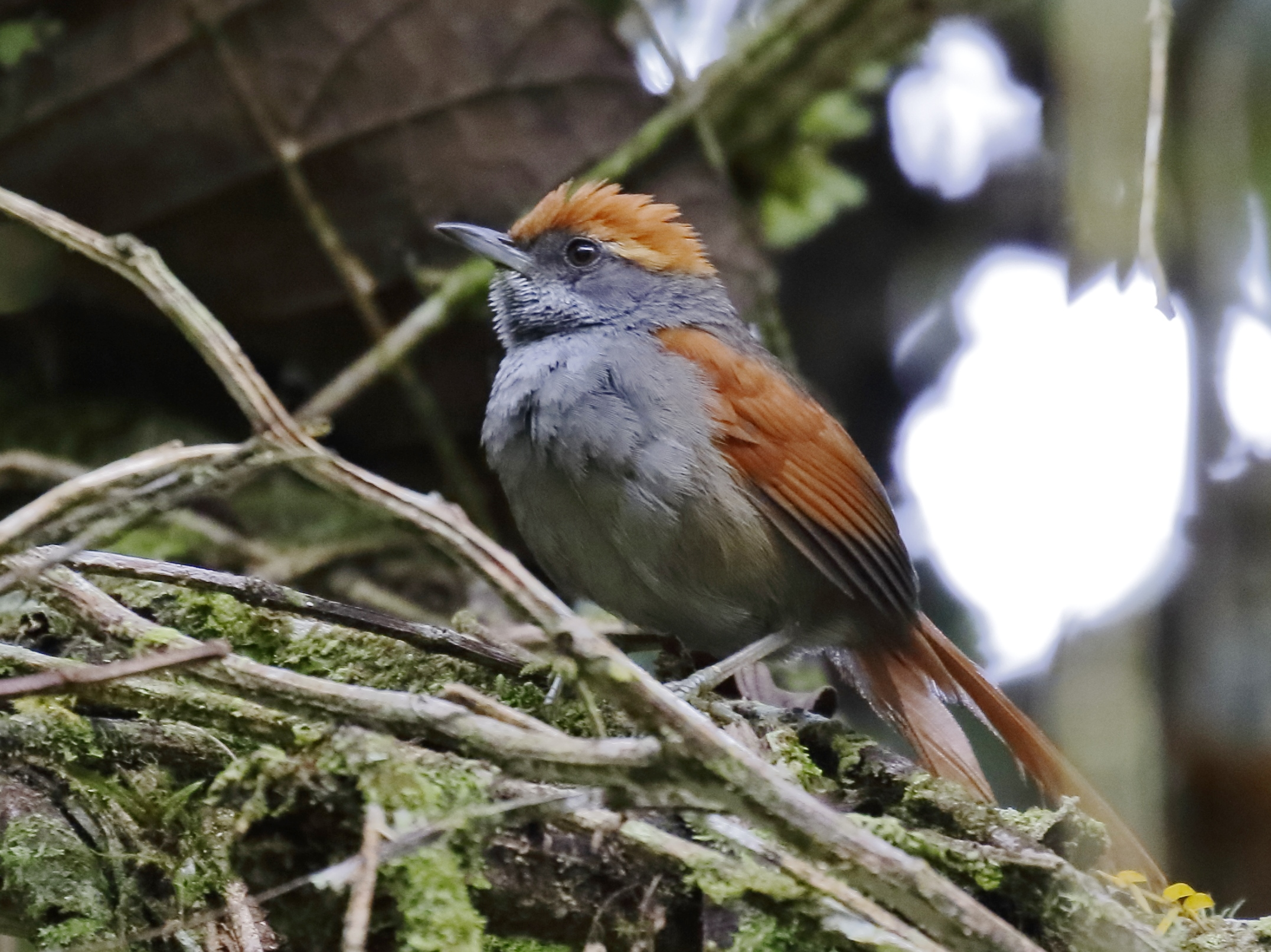
- Boa Nova, Bahia

Conservation status
- Near Threatened (IUCN 3.1)

Scientific classification
- Kingdom: Animalia
- Phylum: Chordata
- Class: Aves
- Order: Passeriformes
- Family: Furnariidae
- Genus: Synallaxis
- Species: S. cinerea

Binomial name
- Synallaxis cinerea Wied, 1831

Synonyms
- Synallaxis whitneyi

= Bahia spinetail =

Species of bird in Brazil

The Bahia spinetail (Synallaxis cinerea) is a Near Threatened species of bird in the Furnariinae subfamily of the ovenbird family Furnariidae. It is endemic to Brazil.

== Taxonomy and systematics ==
The Bahia spinetail was long treated as a conspecific population of the rufous-capped spinetail (S. ruficapilla) and data both support and refute that treatment. As of late 2023 major taxonomic systems treat the Bahia spinetail as a full species with no subspecies. Its specific epithet has bounced between whitneyi and the current cinerea.

== Description ==
The Bahia spinetail is 15 to 17 cm (5.9 to 6.7 in) long and weighs 16 to 21 g (0.56 to 0.74 oz). The sexes have the same plumage. Adults have a wide cinnamon-buff supercilium and brownish gray lores and ear coverts. Their crown and nape are bright orange-rufous and their back, rump, and uppertail coverts are rufescent brown. Their wings are mostly chestnut-brown. Their tail is chestnut; it is graduated and the feathers have pointed tips. Their chin has a tiny tawny spot; the rest of their chin and throat are whitish with faint gray streaks. The rest of their underparts are dark grayish. Their iris is reddish brown to dark brown, their bill dark gray (sometimes with a paler base), and their legs and feet olivaceous to dark gray.

== Distribution and habitat ==
The Bahia spinetail is found in eastern Brazil, in a very small area spanning southern Bahia and northeastern Minas Gerais. It inhabits the undergrowth of montane evergreen forest, where it favors edges dense with vines, ferns, and bamboo. In elevation it ranges between 500 and 1,000 m (1,600 and 3,300 ft).

== Behavior ==
=== Movement ===
The Bahia spinetail is a year-round resident throughout its range.

=== Feeding ===
The Bahia spinetail feeds on arthropods. It usually forages in pairs, gleaning and probing dead leaves and small branches. It typically feeds 1 to 2 m (3 to 7 ft) above the ground but will feed on the ground and as high as 5 m (16 ft).

=== Breeding ===
Nothing is known about the Bahia spinetail's breeding biology.

=== Vocalization ===
The Bahia spinetail's song is "a double-noted 'di-réét, di-réét' ", sung by both members of a pair. Its call is a "high, dry 'rutrut-' ".

== Status ==
The IUCN originally assessed the Bahia spinetail in 2000 as Endangered, then in 2004 as Vulnerable, and since 2016 as Near Threatened. It has a very small range and an estimated population of 4400 to 13,200 mature individuals that is believed to be decreasing. Though its range is small, outlying populations continue to be discovered so its numbers may be higher than thought. Its habitat is badly fragmented and under pressure from forest clearing for agriculture, ranching, and logging. Even the nominally protected Chapada da Diamantina National Park has suffered from illegal logging. It is considered fairly common to common in suitable habitat.
