= Plain-winged antwren =

- Male
- Female

Conservation status
- Least Concern (IUCN 3.1)

Scientific classification
- Kingdom: Animalia
- Phylum: Chordata
- Class: Aves
- Order: Passeriformes
- Family: Thamnophilidae
- Genus: Myrmotherula
- Species: M. behni

Binomial name
- Myrmotherula behni Berlepsch & Leverkühn, 1890

Species of bird

The plain-winged antwren (Myrmotherula behni) is a species of bird in subfamily Thamnophilinae of family Thamnophilidae, the "typical antbirds". It is found in Brazil, Colombia, Ecuador, Guyana, Venezuela, and possibly Suriname.

== Taxonomy and systematics ==
The plain-winged antwren has these four subspecies:

- M. b. behni Berlepsch & Leverkühn, 1890
- M. b. yavii Zimmer, JT & Phelps, WH, 1948
- M. b. inornata Sclater, PL, 1890
- M. b. camanii Phelps, WH & Phelps, WH Jr, 1952

The plain-winged antwren, the Alagoas antwren (M. snowi), the unicolored antwren (M. unicolor), and the Yungas antwren (M. grisea) appear to form a monophyletic group with similar vocalizations and habitat requirements.

The plain-winged antwren's specific epithet honors Wilhelm Friedrich Georg Behn.

== Description ==
The plain-winged antwren is 9 to 9.5 cm (3.5 to 3.7 in) long; one female weighed 7.9 g (0.28 oz). It is a smallish bird with a short tail. Adult males of the nominate subspecies M. b. behni are almost entirely gray, with lighter underparts than upperparts. Their chin and the center of their throat and upper breast are black. Adult females have olivaceous brown upperparts with a grayish tinge on the crown and nape and a somewhat duskier tail. Their wings are olivaceous brown. Their throat is whitish and the rest of their underparts olive-buff.

Males of subspecies M. b. yavii are darker than the nominate. Females have dark olive-buff flanks and crissum. Males of subspecies M. b. camanii are intermediate between the nominate and yavii. Females have somewhat less brown underparts than the nominate. Subspecies M. b. inornata is larger than the nominate. Males are darker with a wider black area on the throat. Females have rufescent brown upperparts and an olivaceous brown crissum.

== Distribution and habitat ==
The plain-winged antwren has a highly disjunct distribution. The subspecies are found thus:

- M. b. behni: Serranía de la Macarena in south-central Colombia's Meta Department and locally and patchily in eastern Ecuador between Sucumbíos Province and Zamora-Chinchipe Province
- M. b. yavii: northwestern Bolívar, Venezuela, and separate from there Venezuela's Amazonas state and adjoining extreme northern Amazonas state in Brazil
- M. b. inornata: southeastern Bolívar in Venezuela, extreme northern Roraima in Brazil, and the Pacaraima Mountains in Guyana (and see below)
- M. b. camanii: Cerro Camani, a tepui in Venezuela's Amazonas state

The South American Classification Committee of the American Ornithological Society has undocumented sight records, presumably of M. b. inornata, in Suriname, and treats the plain-winged antwren as hypothetical in that country.

The plain-winged antwren inhabits the understorey to mid-storey of foothill and lower montane evergreen forest. In Ecuador it appears to favor damp ravines with stands of Guadua bamboo. In Venezuela and Brazil it ranges between elevations of 1,000 and 1,850 m (3,300 and 6,100 ft), in Colombia between 1,200 and 1,800 m (3,900 and 5,900 ft), and in Ecuador mostly between 800 and 1,600 m (2,600 and 5,200 ft).

== Behavior ==
=== Movement ===
The plain-winged antwren is believed to be a year-round resident throughout its range.

=== Feeding ===
The plain-winged antwren's diet is not known in detail but is probably mostly insects and spiders. It forages singly, in pairs, or in family groups, and almost always as part of a mixed-species feeding flock. It feeds mostly between about 1 and 3 m (3 and 10 ft) above the ground where the understorey is dense, and between 4 and 10 m (10 and 30 ft) where it is more open. It actively seeks prey especially among dead leaves and also from live leaves, stems, and branches, mostly by reaching, hanging, lunging, and occasionally by fluttering out from a perch.

=== Breeding ===
Nothing is known about the plain-winged antwren's breeding biology.

=== Vocalization ===
The plain-winged antwren's song is a "series of high, simple, slightly downslurred 'tiuw' notes". Its calls include "a sharp 'sweeík' and a more nasal 'kyunh' ".

== Status ==
The IUCN has assessed the plain-winged antwren as being of Least Concern. It has a large range; its population size is not known and is believed to be decreasing. No immediate threats have been identified. It is considered rare and local throughout its range and occurs in some protected areas. "More survey work is needed in order better to elucidate the distribution, ecology and conservation needs of this poorly known species."
