= Rudolf Blasius =

German physician and biologist

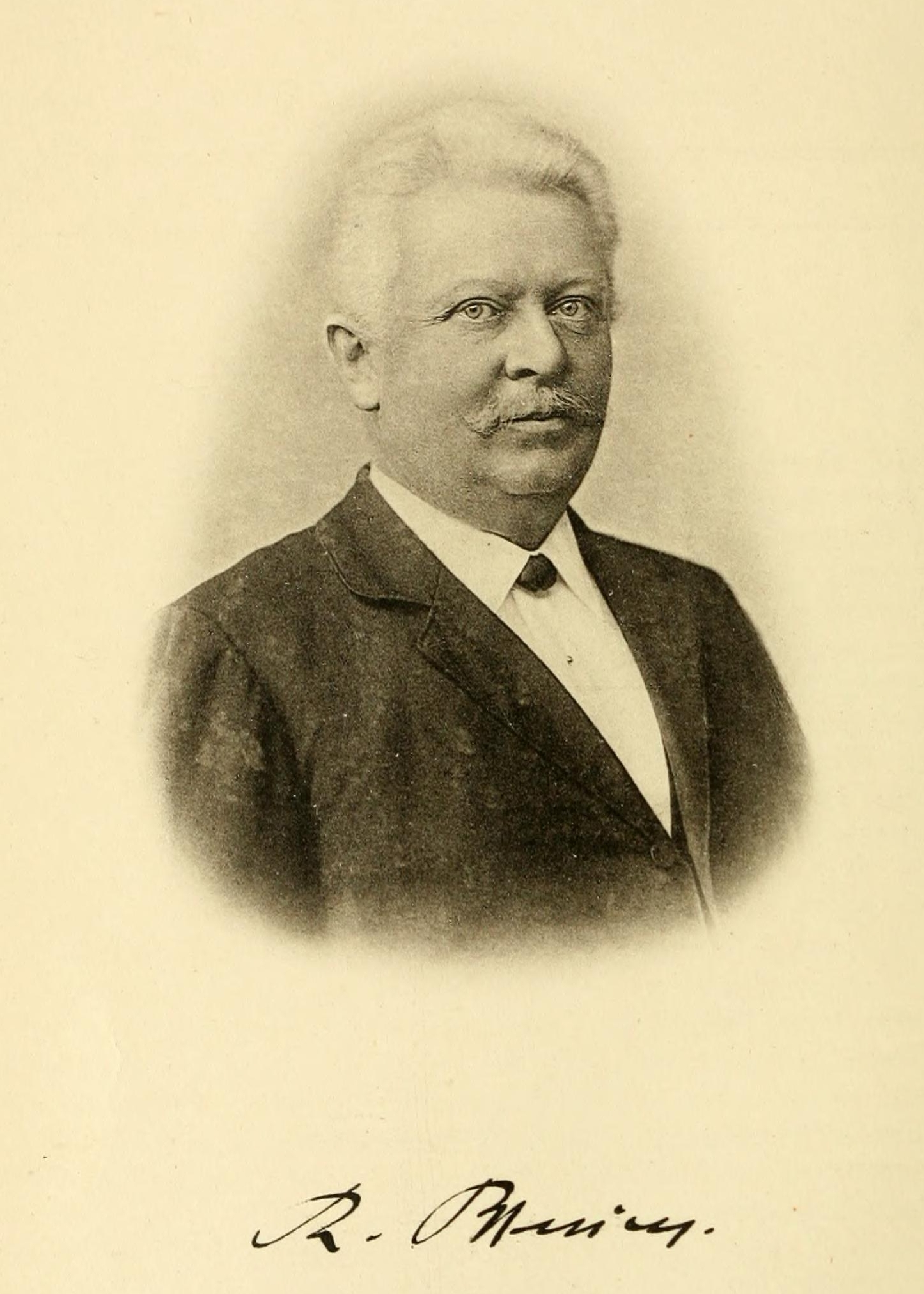

Rudolf Heinrich Paul Blasius (25 November 1842, Braunschweig - 21 September 1907, Braunschweig) was a German physician, bacteriologist, naturalist and ornithologist.

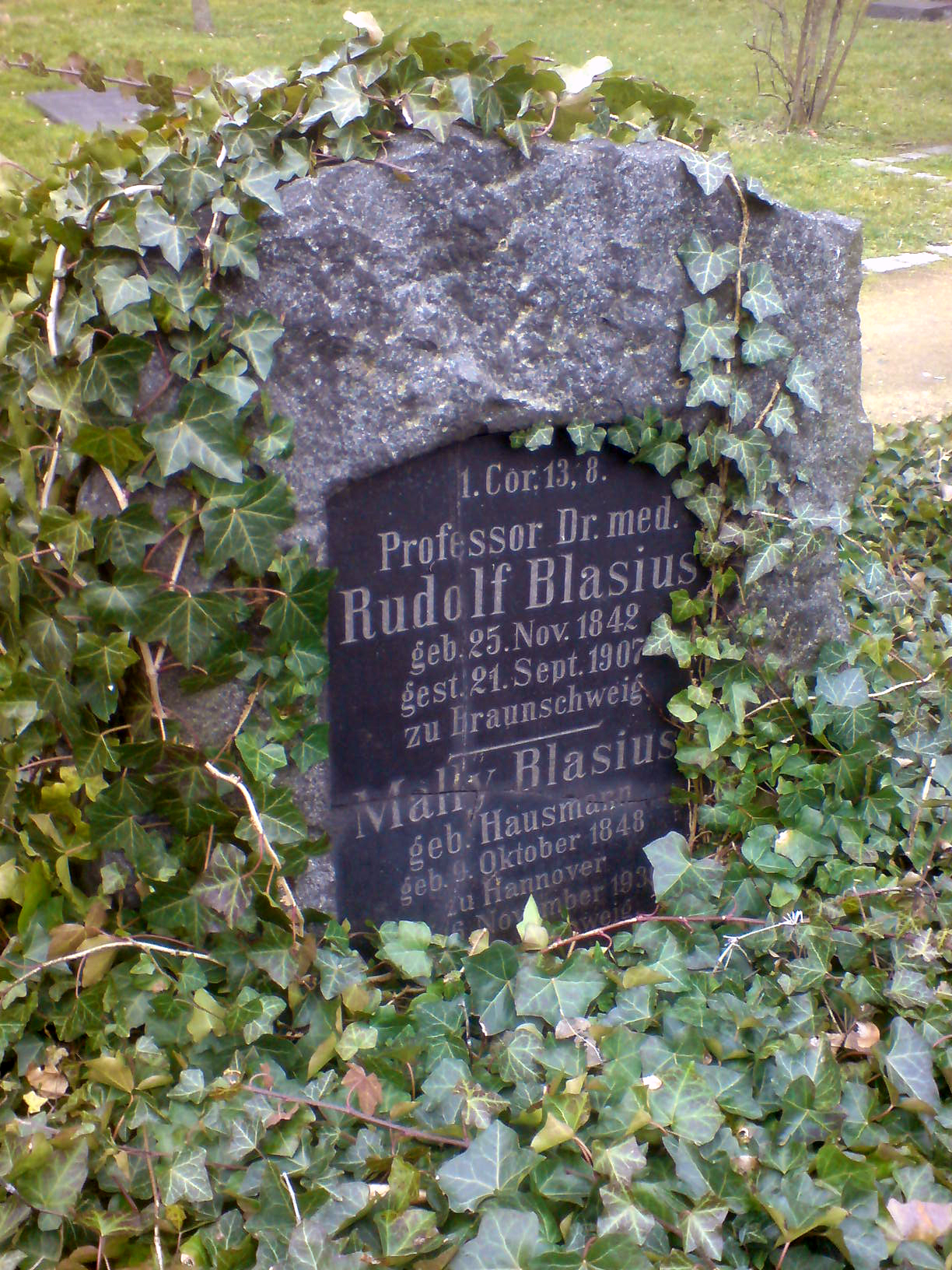
Grave of Rudolf and Mally Blasius

Blasius was the son of Johann Heinrich Blasius, professor of natural history at the Collegium Carolinum and director of the Ducal Museum and Luise (née Thiele) (1822-1886). The family came from Sophiental and Rudolf became interested in natural history of the region while visiting his grandparents. His brother Wilhelm Blasius became an ornithologist. He later went on field trips with Adolph Nehrkorn and they published a list of the birds of the Braunschweig region. Rudolf studied at the Collegium Carolinum and then studied medicine at the University of Göttingen, the University of Zurich, and then Göttingen where he worked on his doctoral thesis. He studied the microstructure of bird eggs and obtained his degree on January 30, 1866. He joined military service as a doctor and then went for further medical training to Vienna. He became a physician at Göttingen and later at Braunschweig. He also taught at the University of Braunschweig.

Blasius married Mally Hausmann on 14 August 1868 and they had two sons and two daughters. He honeymooned to Mount Etna and during this period, studied the birds of the region. He was elected President of the International Ornithological Committee in 1884 and president of the German Ornithologists Society in 1900.

Blasius died in 1907 at Braunschweig from a chest infection.
