= Johann Heinrich Blasius =

German zoologist (1809–1870)

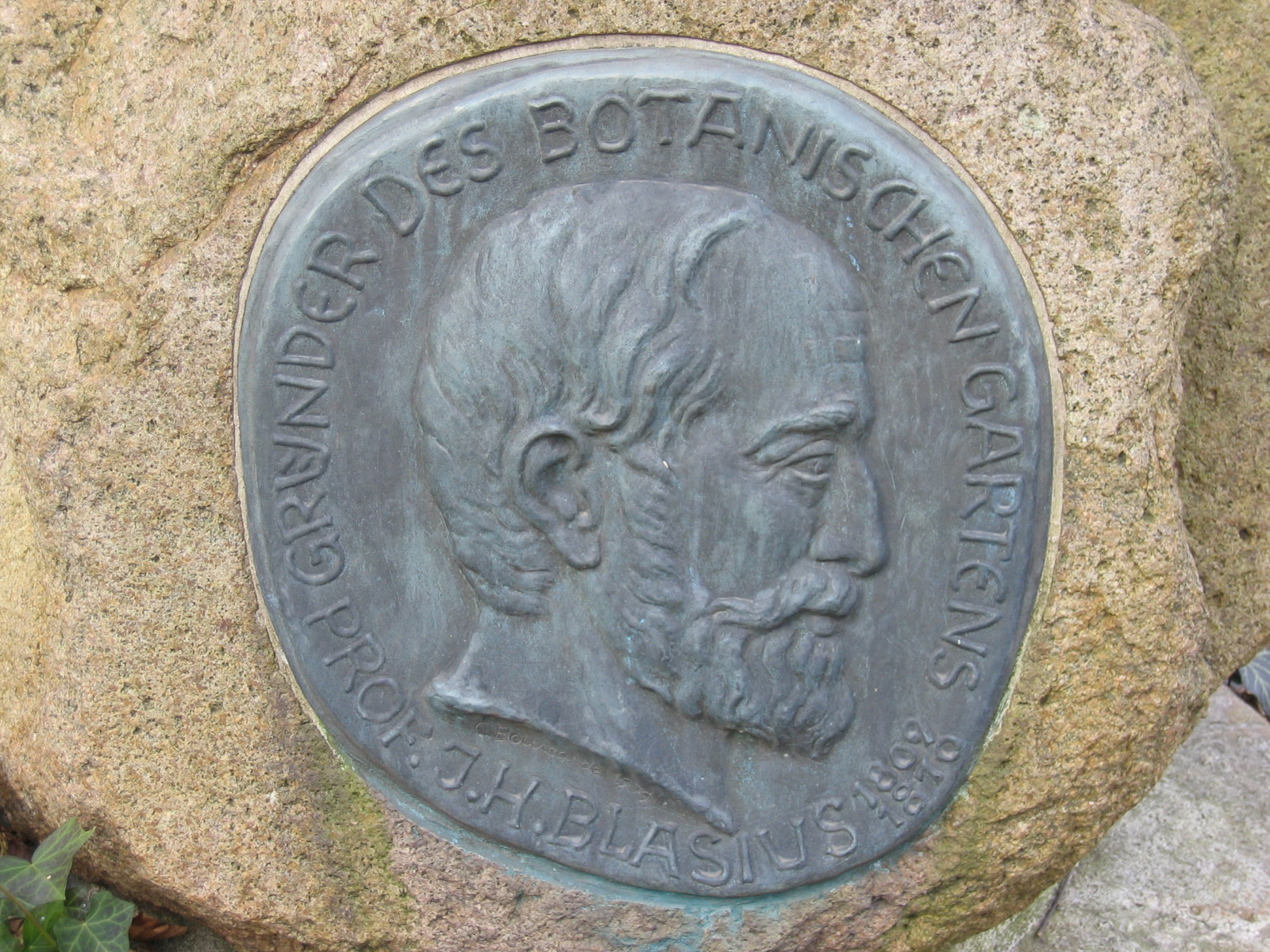
Relief of Johann Heinrich Blasius in the Botanical Garden Braunschweig

Johann Heinrich Blasius (7 October 1809 – 26 May 1870) was a German zoologist. His sons, Rudolf Heinrich Paul Blasius (1842-1907) and August Wilhelm Heinrich Blasius (1845–1912) were ornithologists.

== Biography ==
Blasius was born on 7 October 1809. In 1836, he was appointed as a professor at the Collegium Carolinum in Braunschweig. In 1840, he founded the Botanischer Garten der Technischen Universität Braunschweig. In 1859, he was appointed as the director of the newly founded Naturhistorisches Museum (Braunschweig) and in 1866 also of the Herzog Anton Ulrich Museum.

== Writings ==
He was the author of two major books on vertebrates: "Fauna der Wirbelthiere Deutschlands" (1857), and "Die wirbelthiere Europa's" (Vertebrates of Europe, with Alexander von Keyserling, 1840). He also wrote "Reise im Europäischen Russland in den Jahren 1840 und 1851" (Journey to European Russia in the years 1840 & 1851). In 1862, ornithologist Alfred Newton (1829–1907) published "A list of the birds of Europe", a translation based on Blasius' research.

Blasius was also an early contemporary critic of Darwin's On the Origin of Species:

I have also seldom read a scientific book which makes such wide-ranging conclusions with so few facts supporting them. … Darwin wants to show that kinds come from other kinds [German Arten]. I regard this as somewhat of a highhanded hypothesis, because he argues using unproven possibilities, without even naming a single example of the origin of a particular species. …
Zoologists who engage in empirical research would generally regard as valid only that which can be observed in an experiment or in free-living nature. And what one observes there is that the offspring of a plant or animal inevitably resembles the parents, i.e. they belong to the same kind. The immovability of the boundaries of the kinds is, for most of us, a law of nature.
