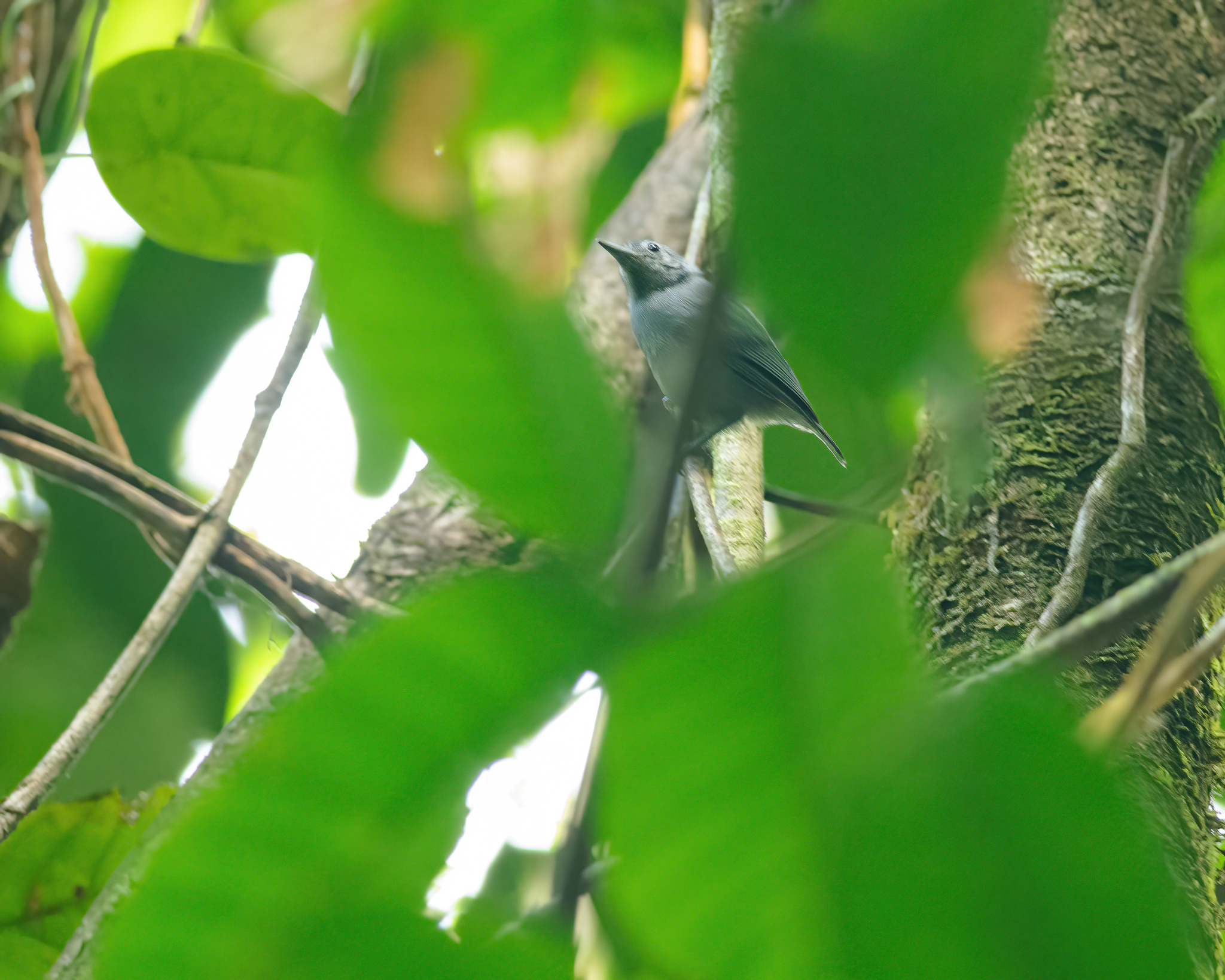

Conservation status
- Critically Endangered (IUCN 3.1)

Scientific classification
- Kingdom: Animalia
- Phylum: Chordata
- Class: Aves
- Order: Passeriformes
- Family: Thamnophilidae
- Genus: Myrmotherula
- Species: M. snowi

Binomial name
- Myrmotherula snowi Teixeira & Gonzaga, 1985

= Alagoas antwren =

Species of bird in Brazil

The Alagoas antwren (Myrmotherula snowi) is a Critically Endangered species of bird in subfamily Thamnophilinae of family Thamnophilidae, the "typical antbirds". It is endemic to Brazil.

== Taxonomy and systematics ==
The Alagoas antwren was originally described as a subspecies of the unicolored antwren (M. unicolor) but since the late twentieth century has been recognized as a full species. The two form a superspecies. The Alagoas antwren, the unicolored antwren (M. unicolor), the Yungas antwren (M. grisea), and the plain-winged antwren (M. behni) appear to form a monophyletic group with similar vocalizations and habitat requirements.

The Alagoas antwren's specific epithet honors David Snow, a British ornithologist "who was a pioneer in life history studies of Neotropical birds".

== Description ==
The Alagoas antwren is 9.5 to 10.5 cm (3.7 to 4.1 in) long and weighs about 8 to 11.5 g (0.28 to 0.41 oz). It is a small bird with a short tail. Adult males are almost entirely gray, with lighter underparts than upperparts. Their throat feathers have black bases and gray tips. Adult females are mostly rufous-brown with darker wing coverts and paler cheeks and throat. Their iris is brown, their bill brownish gray, and their legs and feet leaden gray.

== Distribution and habitat ==
The Alagoas antwren was first discovered in 1979, near Murici in the eastern Brazilian state of Alagoas, and for many years was known only from that area. In the early 21st century it was discovered at several sites in Pernambuco, about 500 km (310 mi) further north. However, by about 2020 it could again be found only at Murici. It inhabits isolated fragments of semi-humid lowland evergreen forest and is known only from the narrow elevational range of 430 to 790 m (1,400 to 2,600 ft). "No doubt the distribution was much more widespread and continuous, before most forests in this region were cleared".

== Behavior ==
=== Movement ===
The Alagoas antwren is a year-round resident throughout its range.

=== Feeding ===
The Alagoas antwren's diet has not been detailed but is known to include insects. It usually forages in pairs and as part of a mixed-species feeding flock. It actively searches foliage both live and dead in the forest understory, typically between 5 and 8 m (20 and 30 ft) above the ground though at times almost to the ground. Eight years of monitoring the Murici site noted a few instances of pairs accompanying mixed-species feeding flocks but noted that other species typical of such flocks were seldom seen.

=== Breeding ===
Prior to 2021 the Alagoas antwren's breeding biology was essentially unknown. The researchers who determined that it was a species collected a female with an egg in its oviduct in February and noted juveniles with their probable parents in May. A 2021 paper described the discovery of four nests. All were a deep cup made of fungal rhizomorphs with dried leaf fragments on the outside. They were suspended in branch forks between 1.1 and 1.6 m (3.6 and 5.2 ft) above the ground in different species of plant. The first was found in November and contained two eggs. The researchers monitored the nest for three days before it was apparently predated. During that time both parents incubated the clutch. The second nest was found in March with two damaged eggs and the third and fourth were empty in March. The researchers also mist netted juveniles between December and late April. They hypothesized that nest building began in September, egg laying in October/November, hatching in November/December, and fledging in December/January.

=== Vocalization ===
The Alagoas antwren's song is an "irregular series of very high, sharp, drawn-out, well-separated 'seeup' notes, each 'seeup' descending". Its calls include "a single-syllable kleek pair-contact call" and "a three-syllable (sometimes two-syllable), slightly descending vocalization, nyiih-nyeeh-nyaah" that appears to be an alarm call.

== Status ==
The IUCN has assessed the Alagoas antwren as Critically Endangered. It has a tiny, highly fragmented range and its estimated population of fewer than 50 mature individuals (perhaps as few as 30) is believed to be decreasing. "Forest at Murici has been reduced from 70 km^{2} (27 sq mi) in the 1970s to 30 km^{2} (12 sq mi) of highly disturbed and fragmented habitat in 1999...largely as a result of logging and conversion to pasture and sugarcane plantations. The site continues to be threatened by fires spreading from adjacent plantations, hunting, timber extraction and agriculture." "The massive clearance of Atlantic forest in Alagoas and Pernambuco has left few other sites likely to support populations of this species. Having a montane distribution that is close to the maximum altitude within its range, this species is also potentially susceptible to climate change". The 2021 paper's authors urged "actions to protect its nests, recompose mixed flocks, translocate individuals to nearby habitat patches, and attempt captive breeding, [are] among efforts that should be evaluated."
