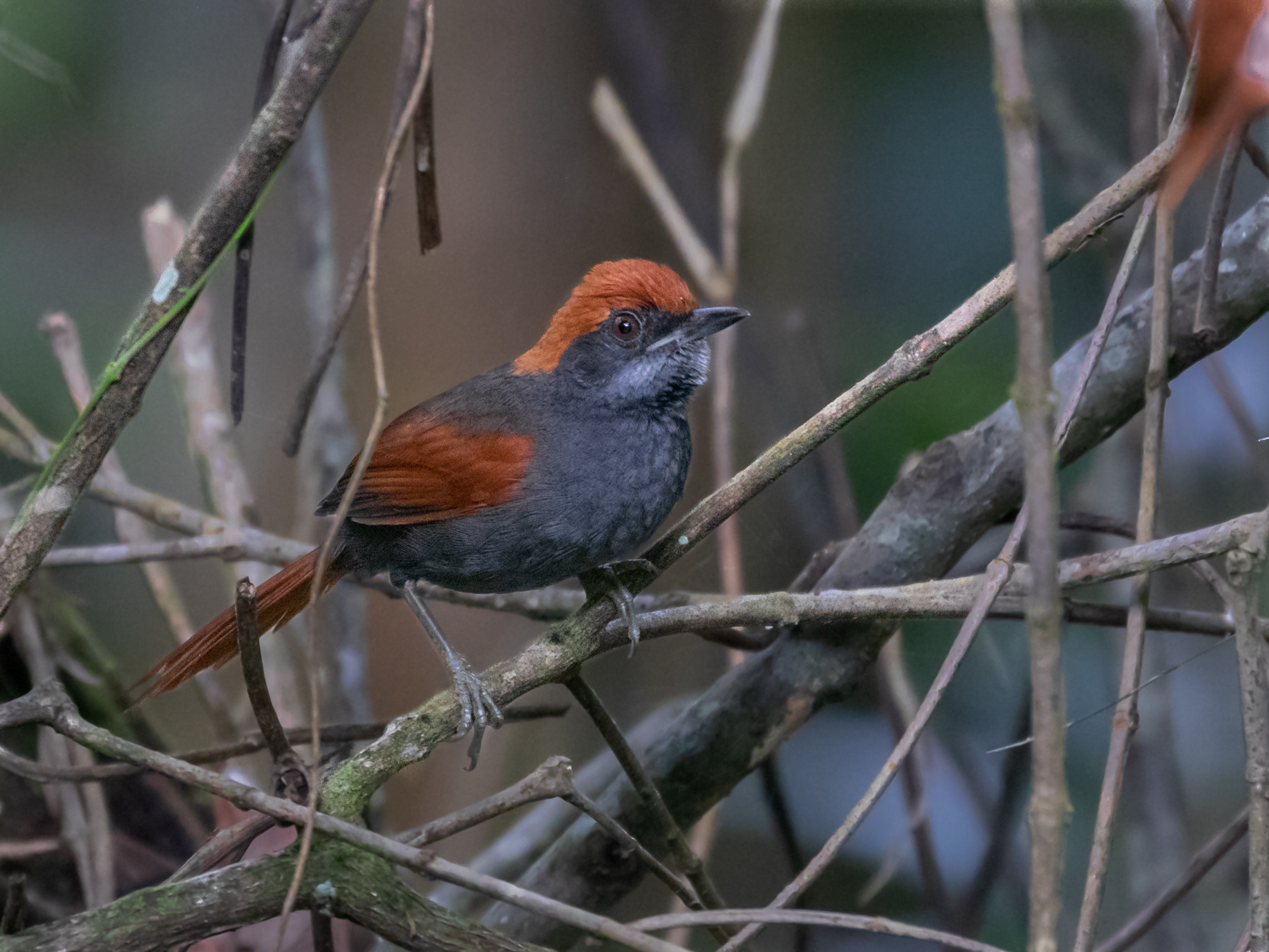

Conservation status
- Endangered (IUCN 3.1)

Scientific classification
- Kingdom: Animalia
- Phylum: Chordata
- Class: Aves
- Order: Passeriformes
- Family: Furnariidae
- Genus: Synallaxis
- Species: S. infuscata

Binomial name
- Synallaxis infuscata Pinto, 1950

= Pinto's spinetail =

Species of bird

Pinto's spinetail (Synallaxis infuscata) is an Endangered species of bird in the Furnariinae subfamily of the ovenbird family Furnariidae. It is endemic to north-eastern Brazil. It is known locally as "tatac".

== Taxonomy and systematics ==
Pinto's spinetail was previously treated as a subspecies of the rufous-capped spinetail (S. ruficapilla) but since the late twentieth century has been acknowledged as a full species. However, its relationship to other members of genus Synallaxis has not been clarified.

Pinto's spinetail is monotypic.

== Description ==
Pinto's spinetail is 16 to 18 cm (6.3 to 7.1 in) long and weighs 16 to 20 g (0.56 to 0.71 oz). The sexes have the same plumage. Adults have a dark grayish face. Their crown and nape are bright reddish chestnut and their back, rump, and uppertail coverts are brownish gray. Their wings are mostly rufous. Their tail is dark rufous-chestnut; it is graduated and the feathers have pointed tips. Their chin has a black spot; the rest of their chin and throat have diffuse whitish and gray streaks. The rest of their underparts are dark slaty gray with sometimes a lighter central belly. Their iris is dark brown, their bill dark gray, and their legs and feet grayish or greenish gray.

== Distribution and habitat ==
Pinto's spinetail is found patchily in far eastern Brazil, in the eastern parts of Paraíba, Alagoas, and Pernambuco states. It inhabits tropical lowland evergreen forest both primary and secondary, usually in dense undergrowth. In elevation it ranges from near sea level to almost 1,100 m (3,600 ft).

== Behavior ==
=== Movement ===
Pinto's spinetail is a year-round resident throughout its range.

=== Feeding ===
Pinto's spinetail feeds on arthropods. It typically forages singly or in pairs, gleaning prey from live and dead leaves and small branches, and usually 1 to 2 m (3 to 7 ft) above the ground.

=== Breeding ===
The breeding season of Pinto's spinetail has not been defined but active nests have been found in January and April, and recently fledged young have also been found in April. Its nest is a globe of sticks, dry leaves, and bark bits with a tunnel entrance at the side. Its inner chamber is lined with leaves or grass with cobwebs. It is typically built in branches where it is well hidden by vines, usually 1 to 5 m (3 to 16 ft) above the ground and only rarely higher. The clutch size is two eggs. The incubation period is 21 to 22 days, fledging occurs 14 to 16 days after hatch, and both parents build the nest, incubate the clutch, and provision the nestlings.

=== Vocalization ===
The song of Pinto's spinetail is described as "reet, reet" and is typically sung twice. Its call is "a spitting trill" and it also makes "a chatter...unlike any vocalization of congeners".

== Status ==
The IUCN originally assessed Pinto's spinetail in 1988 as Threatened, then in 1994 as Endangered, in 2000 as Critically Endangered, and since 2004 again as Endangered. It has a very small and fragmented range and its 2025 estimated population of 300 to 5,000 mature individuals is believed to be decreasing. "There has been massive clearance of Atlantic forest in Alagoas and Pernambuco, and it is estimated that only 2% of the original forested area remains in the range of the species." It is known from perhaps 60 localities scattered across its nominal range. It is considered uncommon to locally common in proper habitat. It occurs in several protected areas that however are under potential threat from fire spreading from adjoining sugarcane plantations. Brazilian authorities consider it Endangered.
