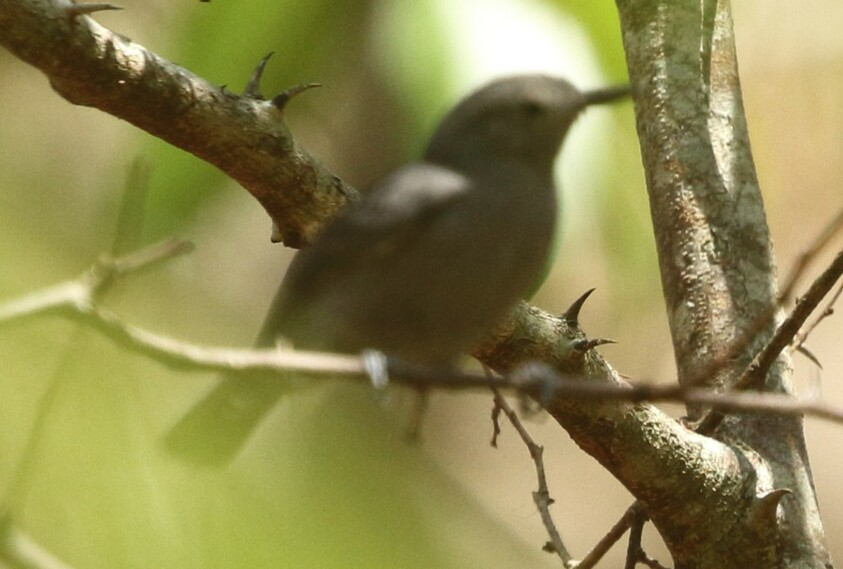

Conservation status
- Least Concern (IUCN 3.1)

Scientific classification
- Kingdom: Animalia
- Phylum: Chordata
- Class: Aves
- Order: Passeriformes
- Family: Thamnophilidae
- Genus: Myrmotherula
- Species: M. grisea

Binomial name
- Myrmotherula grisea Carriker, 1935

= Yungas antwren =

Species of bird

The Yungas antwren or ashy antwren (Myrmotherula grisea) is a bird species in subfamily Thamnophilinae of family Thamnophilidae, the "typical antbirds". It is found in Bolivia and Peru.

== Taxonomy and systematics ==
The Yungas antwren is monotypic. It, the unicolored antwren (M. unicolor), the Alagoas antwren (M. snowi), and the plain-winged antwren (M. behni) appear to form a monophyletic group with similar vocalizations and habitat requirements.

== Description ==
The Jungas antwren is 8.5 to 9.5 cm (3.3 to 3.7 in) long and weighs 8 to 10 g (0.28 to 0.35 oz). It is a smallish bird with a short tail. Adult males are almost entirely gray with slightly darker and more brownish gray wings and tail than body. Adult females have a brownish yellow face. Their upperparts are mostly olive-brown, with a grayish tinge from the crown to upper mantle and yellowish brown tips on the uppertail coverts. Their tail is dark brown with rufous-brown edges to the feathers. Their chin and throat are brownish yellow and their underparts yellow-ochre that is browner on their flanks and crissum. Subadult males are like adults with patches of yellowish brown.

== Distribution and habitat ==
The Jungas antwren was long thought to be endemic to western Bolivia, where it is found on the eastern base of the Andes in the departments of La Paz, Cochabamba, and Santa Cruz. Some taxonomic systems still list it only in that country. However, since the early 21st century it has been documented in southeastern Peru's departments of Cuzco and Puno.

In both countries the Jungas antwren inhabits the mid-storey and subcanopy of evergreen forest in foothills and the submontane zone. It also occurs in the forest's understory at its edges. In elevation it occurs from 500 to 1,650 m (1,600 to 5,400 ft) but is mostly found between about 700 and 1,200 m (2,300 and 3,900 ft).

== Behavior ==
=== Movement ===
The Jungas antwren is believed to be a year-round resident throughout its range.

=== Feeding ===
The Jungas antwren's diet is not known in detail but is probably mostly insects and spiders. It forages singly, in pairs, or in family groups, and often as part of a mixed-species feeding flock. It feeds mostly between about 1 and 20 m (3 and 70 ft) above the ground. It energetically seeks prey mostly from clusters of dead leaves, and also takes prey from live leaves and moss.

=== Breeding ===
Nothing is known about the Jungas antwren's breeding biology.

=== Vocalization ===
The Jungas antwren's song is "a series of simple, slightly downslurred notes on approximately same pitch (c. 4 kHz), delivered rapidly, notes much longer than intervals". Its calls "include sharp, upslurred 'wheep' and upslurred doubled-noted 'do-leep' ".

== Status ==
The IUCN originally in 1988 assessed the Jungas antwren as Threatened, then in 1994 as Vulnerable, in 2008 as Near Threatened, but since 2012 as of Least Concern. Its known range has been increased since the year 2000. Its population size is not known and is believed to be decreasing, but at a slow rate. "It is threatened by deforestation within its small geographic and elevational range, especially in La Paz and Cochabamba." "Nevertheless, vast amounts of pristine forest remain in inaccessible areas within the species's elevational range, although it may be excluded by the harsh climate in some of these areas." It is considered uncommon to common but occurs in only one major protected area. "The foothill yungas forests occupied by this species are drier than forests farther upslope, and therefore more easily cleared for colonization projects."
