= Botanical Garden of TU Braunschweig =

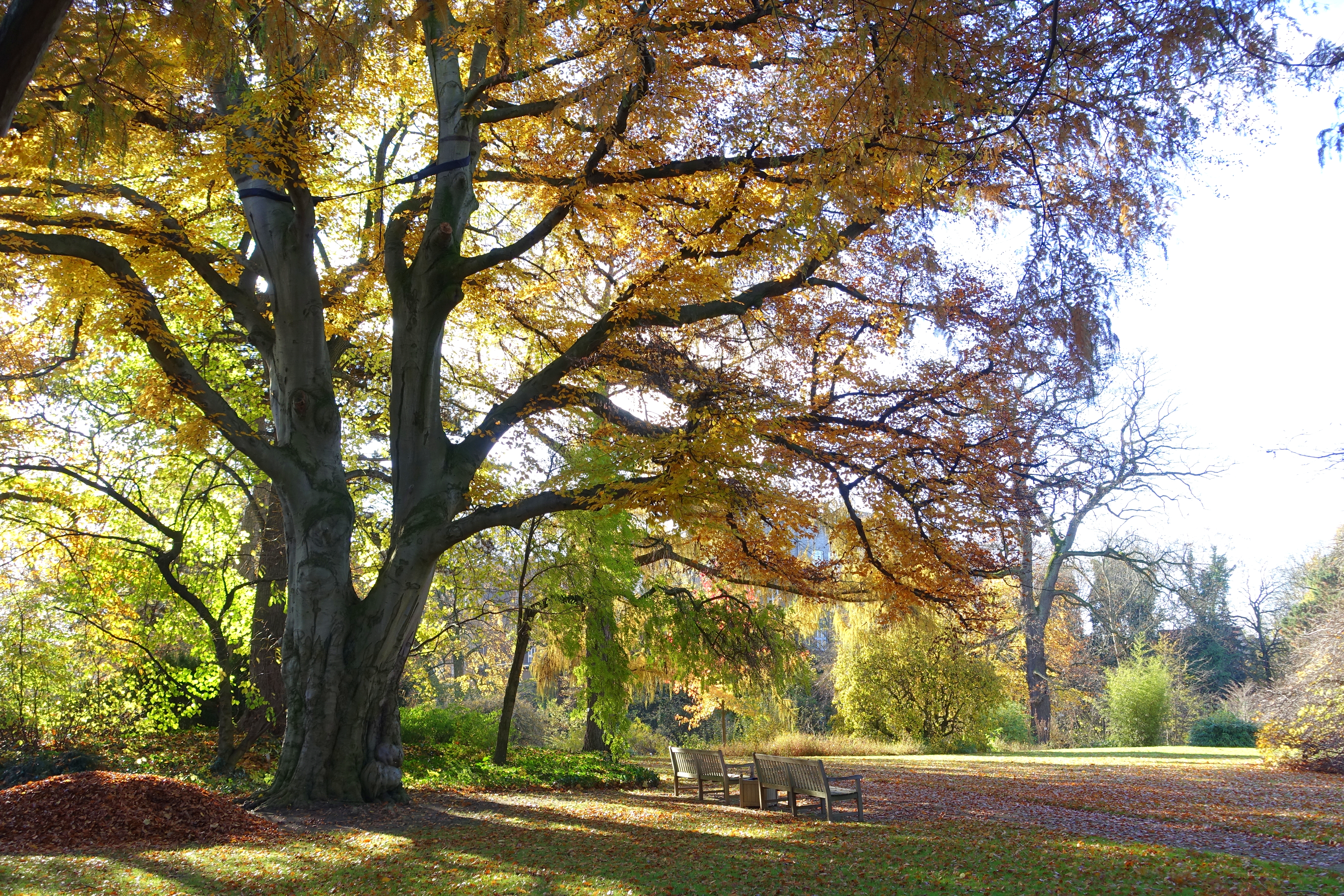
- Interactive map of Botanical Garden of TU Braunschweig
- Type: Botanical garden
- Location: Braunschweig, Lower Saxony, Germany
- Coordinates: 52.271°N 10.533°E
- Opened: 1840
- Status: Open year round
- Website: Official website

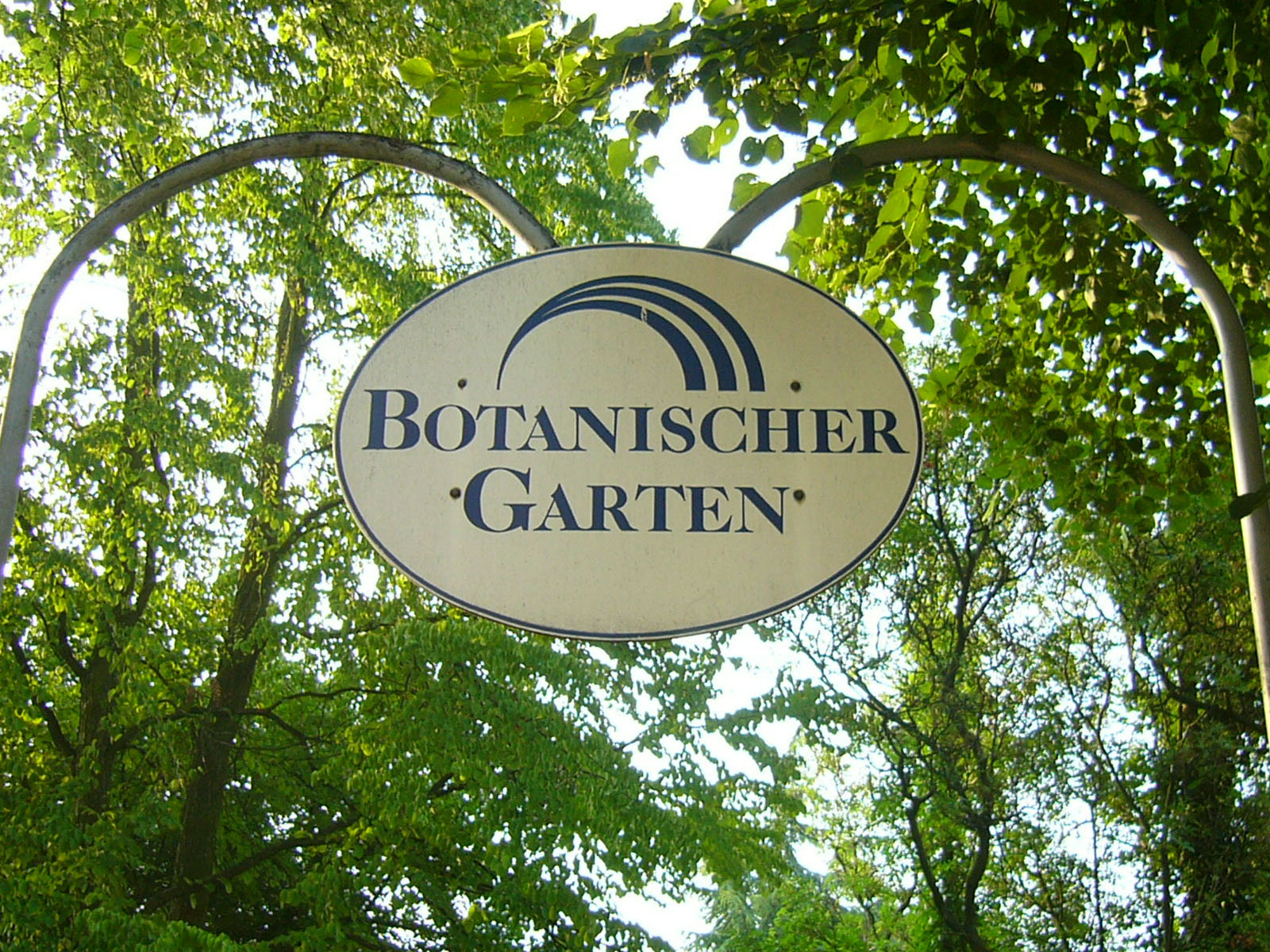
Entrance

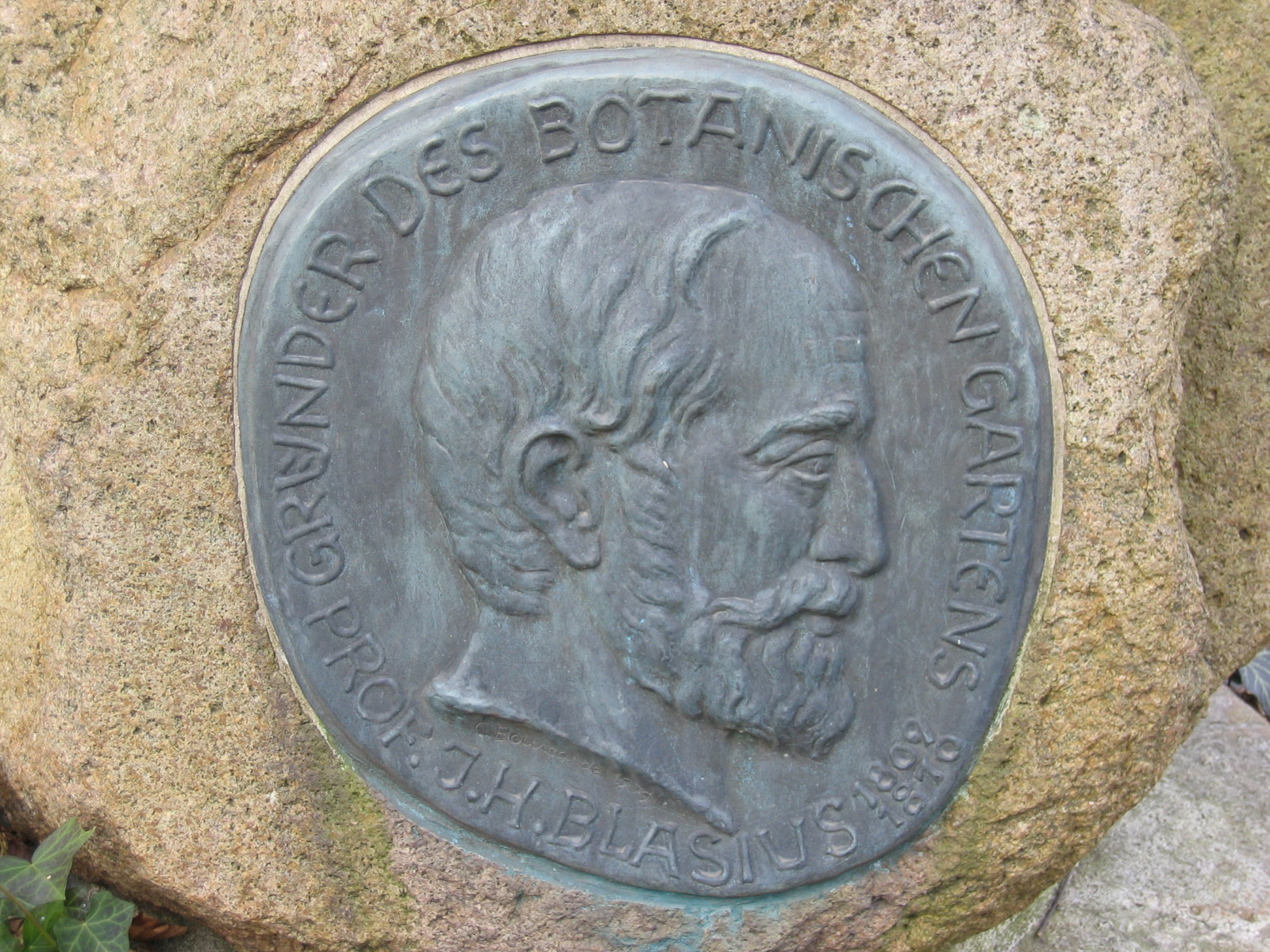
Johann Heinrich Blasius, founder of the botanical garden

The botanical garden of the TU Braunschweig (Botanischer Garten der Technischen Universität Braunschweig) was founded in 1840 by Johann Heinrich Blasius on the banks of the River Oker on the grounds of the former stately mansion in the woods of Braunschweig, Lower Saxony, Germany.

It was originally started in 1828 on the opposite bank of the Oker, a much smaller garden by Blasius, who sought a larger site. The old garden was lost in 1868.

By 1900 there were 2700 species outside and 1200 in greenhouses. Some trees from 1840 remain today. During the Second World War, the garden suffered bombing, especially in the years 1944–45, and was partially destroyed, but was reconstructed after the end of the war.

In 1985, an approximately 800m² Baroque garden, with an emphasis on farming, was laid out, which was augmented with a stream and a waterfall in a small ravine in 1989.

In 1995, the garden area was expanded by about 4 acres (16,000 m^{2}). This area is mainly for research.

== See also ==
- List of botanical gardens in Germany
