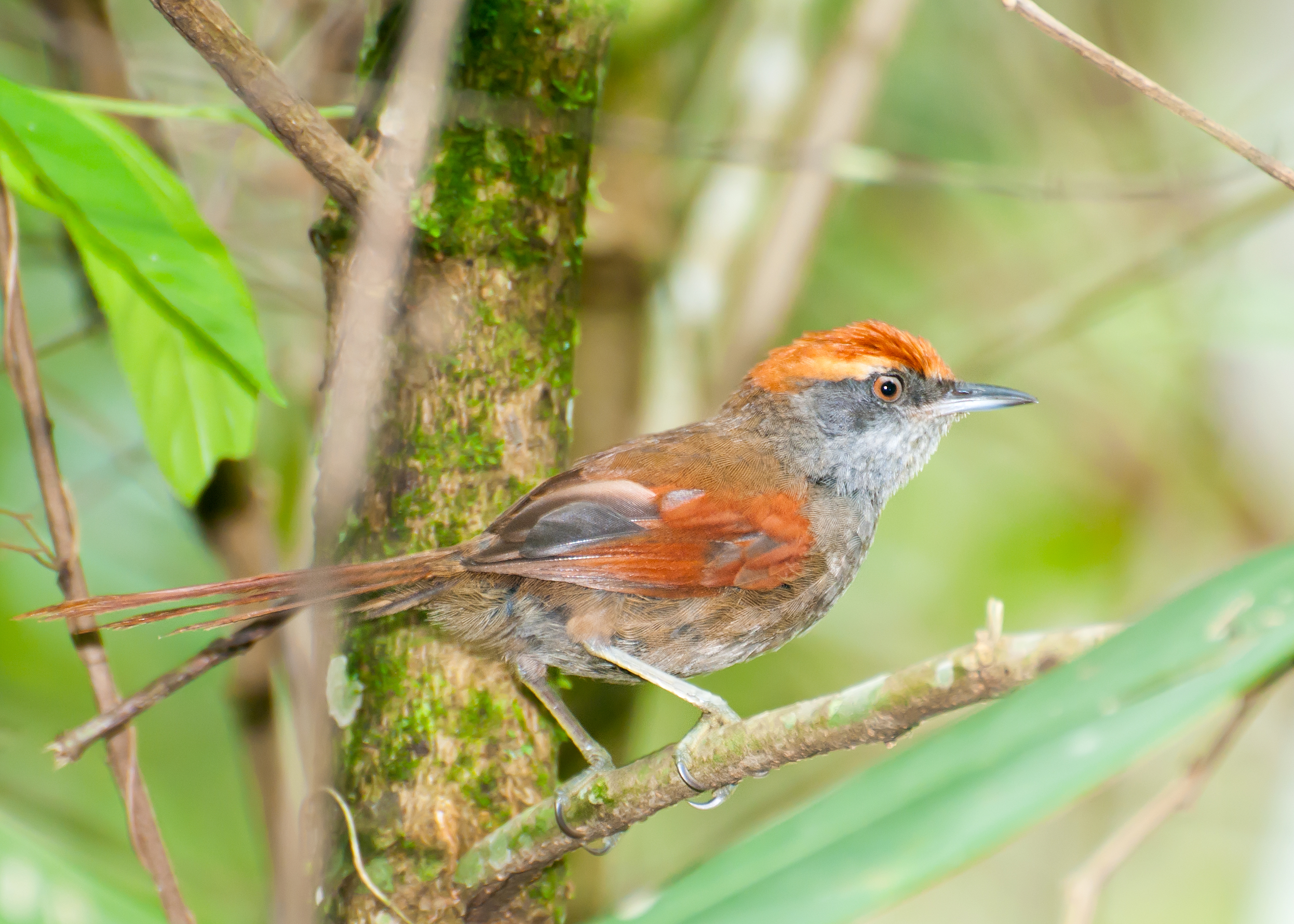
- At Registro, São Paulo, Brazil

Conservation status
- Least Concern (IUCN 3.1)

Scientific classification
- Kingdom: Animalia
- Phylum: Chordata
- Class: Aves
- Order: Passeriformes
- Family: Furnariidae
- Genus: Synallaxis
- Species: S. ruficapilla

Binomial name
- Synallaxis ruficapilla Vieillot, 1819

= Rufous-capped spinetail =

Species of bird

The rufous-capped spinetail (Synallaxis ruficapilla) is a species of bird in the Furnariinae subfamily of the ovenbird family Furnariidae. It is found in Argentina, Brazil, and Paraguay.

== Taxonomy and systematics ==
The rufous-capped spinetail is monotypic.

What is now Pinto's spinetail (S. infuscata) was previous treated as a subspecies of it. What is now the Bahia spinetail (S. cinerea, previously S. whitneyi) was treated as a conspecific population of the rufous-capped and data both support and refute that treatment. As of late 2023 major taxonomic systems treat the Bahia spinetail as a full species.

== Description ==
The rufous-capped spinetail is 13 to 17 cm (5.1 to 6.7 in) long and weighs 12 to 16 g (0.42 to 0.56 oz). The sexes have the same plumage. Adults have a wide buff supercilium and dark brownish gray lores and ear coverts. Their crown and nape are bright orange-rufous and their back, rump, and uppertail coverts are rufescent brown. Their wings are mostly chestnut-brown. Their tail is chestnut; it is graduated and the feathers have pointed tips. Their chin has a tiny tawny spot; the rest of their chin and throat are whitish with faint gray streaks. Their upper breast is grayish and the rest of their underparts paler buffy brownish. Their iris is reddish brown, their maxilla black, their mandible gray with a dark tip, and their legs and feet greenish gray. Juveniles have a duller crown than adults, with little or no chin spot and an ochraceous or brownish wash on the underparts.

== Distribution and habitat ==
The rufous-capped spinetail is found in Brazil from southern Goiás east to Espírito Santo and south into northern Rio Grande do Sul, in far eastern Paraguay, and in northern Argentina's Misiones and Corrientes provinces. It inhabits the undergrowth and edges of a variety of forest landscapes including montane and lowland evergreen forest both primary and secondary. It is strongly associated with stands of Chusquea bamboo. In elevation it ranges from near sea level to 1,400 m (4,600 ft).

== Behavior ==
=== Movement ===
The rufous-capped spinetail is a year-round resident throughout its range.

=== Feeding ===
The rufous-capped spinetail's diet and feeding behavior are not well known. It is assumed to feed mostly on arthropods. It primarily forages in pairs and often joins mixed-species feeding flocks. It usually forages in the forest understorey but will occasionally do so on the ground up into the mid-storey. It is thought to capture prey by gleaning from foliage and small branches.

=== Breeding ===
The rufous-capped spinetail breeds during the austral spring and summer. It is thought to be monogamous. Its nest is a bulky mass of thorny sticks with a downward-slanting entrance tube, typically placed in dense vegetation between 1 and 2.5 m (3 and 8 ft) above the ground. The clutch size is two to three eggs. The incubation period, time to fledging, and details of parental care are not known.

=== Vocalization ===
The rufous-capped spinetail's song has variously been described as "a fast nasal 'di-di-di-réét' ", "tdrrrWit", and "a quiet, insistent 'drrrrrt wee' ". Its call is "a distinctive low-pitched trill, 'tshrrr' " also described as a "dry rattle, like 'trrrrruh' ".

== Status ==
The IUCN has assessed the rufous-capped spinetail as being of Least Concern. It has a large range and an unknown population size; the latter is believed to be stable. No immediate threats have been identified. It is rather poorly known but considered uncommon to common. It is found in several protected areas.
