= Hans von Berlepsch =

German ornithologist (1850–1915)

Hans Hermann Carl Ludwig von Berlepsch
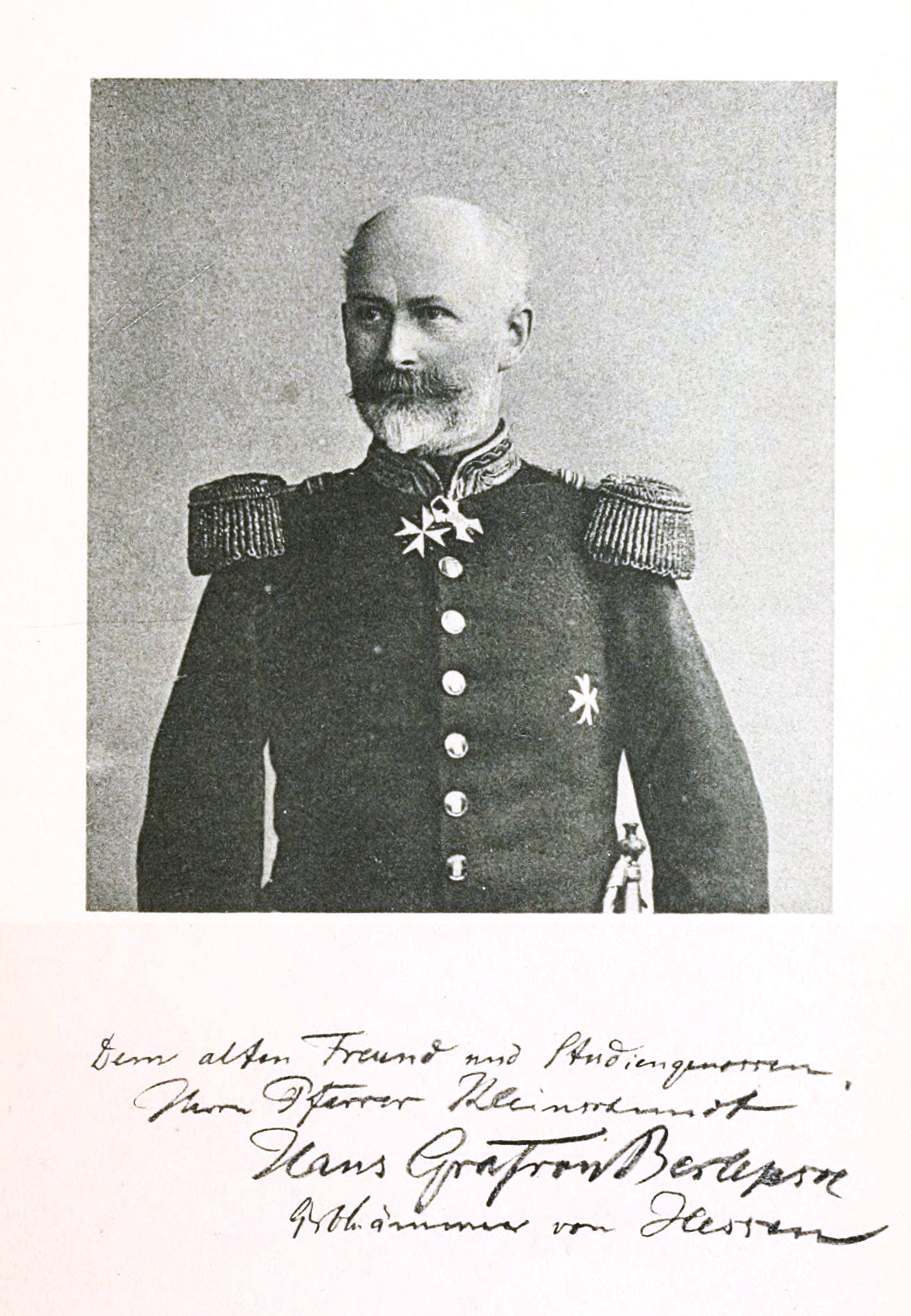
- Born: July 29, 1850
- Died: February 27, 1915 (aged 64)

Count Hans Hermann Carl Ludwig von Berlepsch (29 July 1850 – 27 February 1915) was a German ornithologist who took an interest in the birds of South America. He also had a cousin named Baron Sittich Hans von Berlepsch (1857-1933) with whom he was often confused. This cousin had travelled to South America and was involved in bird conservation and he once sent back a French medal honoring the bird-collecting ornithologist for discovering a new hummingbird. Von Berlepsch was in touch with most European ornithologists and collectors of his time, often hosting them at his home.

== Life and work ==
Berlepsch was born in Fahrenbach near Witzenhausen. He came from a Hessian family with a coat of arms that included five parrots. He was the first son of Karl von Berlepsch and his wife Johanna Margaretha Theodora who was the daughter of state-councillor Koch of Kassel. He was privately tutored at home, one of the tutors being Pastor Degering who created an early interest in orchids. At twelve he went to a grammar school in Kassel. His parents moved to Berlepsch Castle and he visited home only on holidays. He joined the Kassel Hussar Regiment in 1870 and then studied zoology at Leipzig and at the University of Halle. He studied languages at Zurich for two semesters. In Halle he met Wilhelm Schlitter who introduced him to bird collections, having held a large collection of birds from Santa Catharina in Brazil. He examined the collections and wrote a treatise on the ornithology of the province of Santa Catharina in 1873-74. He visited London where he met P. L. Sclater and then Jean Cabanis in France. Returning to Germany he lived in Kassel where he married Emma von Bülow in 1881. He then used his inherited wealth to sponsor bird collectors in South America, including Jan Kalinowski, the Garlepps, and Hermann von Ihering. Sclater would visit the Count's house in Münden where the couple settled. Other ornithologists who visited included Jean Stolzmann, Ernst Hartert who worked for the collections, Ladislas Taczanowski, Paul Leverkuehn, and Friedrich Kutter. Otto Kleinschmidt also helped when the family moved their home and collections to the Berlepsch Castle. He was meticulous with the retention of collectors labels and collection localities unlike some private collectors who removed what was sent to them. He became a specialist on identifying the source of skins merely by examining the method and style of preparation and the handwriting on the labels. He catalogued the collections more for ease of access rather than for systematics. He accepted Darwin's theory of evolution much to the disapproval of his friend Otto Kleinschmidt. In 1900 Carl Hellmayr met the Count and began to examine the collections three years later. Several new species were named from the collections, some in honour of Berlepsch. His collection of 55,000 birds was sold to the Senckenberg Museum at Frankfurt on Main after his death.

Species commemorating Berlepsch include Berlepsch's six-wired bird-of-paradise, Berlepsch's tinamou, and, in its Latin name, the bronze parotia (Parotia berlepschi).
