= Adolph Nehrkorn =

German ornithologist

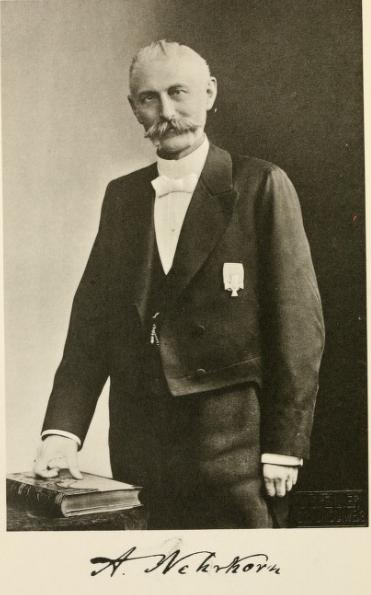
Adolph Nehrkorn

Adolph Nehrkorn (29 December 1841, in Riddagshausen, today part of Braunschweig – 8 April 1916, in Braunschweig) was a German ornithologist and collector of bird eggs.

Adolph's father worked at the Abbey in Riddagshausen. His early schooling was at Collegium Carolinum in Braunschweig. After working for some years as a farmer, he went to study at the University of Berlin. In 1866 he married Ellen Streichenberg. He took a great interest in birds, collecting their eggs. His large collection of eggs was bequeathed to the Berlin Zoological Museum (which in the present day is the Berlin's Natural History Museum).

The crimson-crowned flowerpecker (Dicaeum nehrkorni) and the Sangihe white-eye (Zosterops nehrkorni) are two avian species named in his honor.
