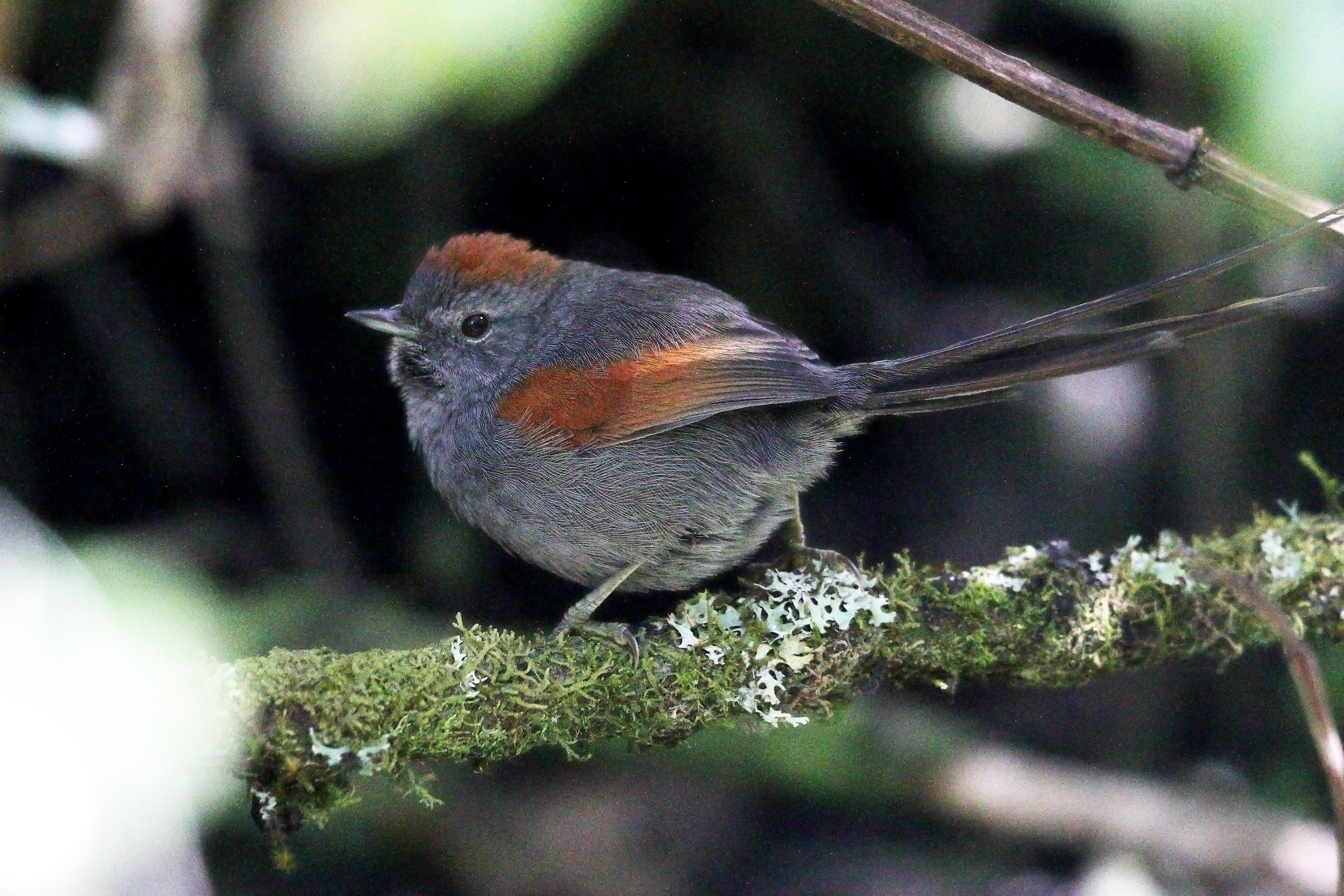

Conservation status
- Vulnerable (IUCN 3.1)

Scientific classification
- Kingdom: Animalia
- Phylum: Chordata
- Class: Aves
- Order: Passeriformes
- Family: Furnariidae
- Genus: Synallaxis
- Species: S. courseni

Binomial name
- Synallaxis courseni Blake, 1971

= Apurímac spinetail =

Species of bird

The Apurimac spinetail (Note: Major taxonomic systems spell the English name with no diacritics. The IOC is the Wikipedia standard for bird names.) (Synallaxis courseni) is a Vulnerable species of bird in the Furnariinae subfamily of the ovenbird family Furnariidae. It is endemic to Peru.

== Taxonomy and systematics ==
The Apurimac spinetail was thought to be most closely related to the slaty spinetail (S. brachyura). By the late twentieth century it was considered more closely related to Azara's spinetail (S. azarae) and a study published in 2011 confirmed that. Some authors have suggested that it is best treated as a subspecies of Azara's spinetail.

Blake, who first described the Apurimac spinetail, chose its specific epithet courseni to honor C. Blair Coursen, "whose interest in neotropical birds and timely generosity in support of field work have resulted in important Peruvian collections" from which the holotype came.

The Apurimac spinetail is monotypic.

== Description ==
The Apurimac spinetail is 17 to 18 cm (6.7 to 7.1 in) long and weighs about 15 g (0.53 oz). The sexes have the same plumage. Adults have a pale gray supercilium on an otherwise dark gray face. Their forecrown is dark gray, their hindcrown and nape dark rufous, and their back, rump and uppertail coverts dark gray with a faint olivaceous tinge. Their wings are rufous with dark brown tips on the flight feathers. Their tail is dark sooty brown with a hint of rufous; the tail is very long and graduated, and the feathers have slightly pointed tips. Their throat is sooty black with pale gray edges to the feathers. Their breast, belly, and undertail coverts are dark gray; their flanks are dark gray with a faint olivaceous wash. Their iris is dark chestnut, their maxilla black or dark gray, their mandible bluish gray with a black tip, and their legs and feet dark gray.

== Distribution and habitat ==
The Apurimac spinetail has a very small range in south-central Peru, on the slopes of Ampay, a large mountain southwest of the Apurimac River. Much, but not all, of its known area of occurrence is within Ampay National Sanctuary. It inhabits cloudforest, humid Podocarpus forest, and regrowing vegetation in clearings and landslide scars. It favors dense understory and stands of Chusquea bamboo. In elevation it occurs between 2,450 and 3,500 m (8,000 and 11,500 ft).

== Behavior ==
=== Movement ===
The Apurimac spinetail is not known to make any latitudinal or elevational movements.

=== Feeding ===
The Apurimac spinetail feeds on arthropods, though details of its diet are lacking. It typically forages singly or in pairs and occasionally joins mixed-species feeding flocks. It gleans prey from moss, lichen, small branches, and foliage, typically in dense cover near or on the ground.

=== Breeding ===
Immature Apurimac spinetails have been seen in March but nothing else is known about the species' breeding biology.

=== Vocalization ===
The Apurimac's spinetail's song is essentially the same as that of Azara's spinetail, a "sharp nasal-like keet-kweet" that is often repeated for minutes at a time. An apparent contact call is "a low chatter" and it also makes a "low-pitched, guttural/squeeky or churring trill".

== Status ==
The IUCN originally in 1988 assessed the Apurimac spinetail as Threatened and since 1994 has rated it Vulnerable. It has a very small range; its estimated population of 600 to 1700 mature individuals is believed to be stable. "Podocarpus trees continue to be cut on the Nevada Ampay. Large numbers of people visit the [Ampay National Sanctuary]...and disturbance is considerable. Grazing is an additional threat, with livestock farming commonplace even inside the protected area." It is commonly found in at least one highly fragmented forest, "indicating that the species may be tolerant, to a degree, of anthropogenic habitat fragmentation and degradation".
