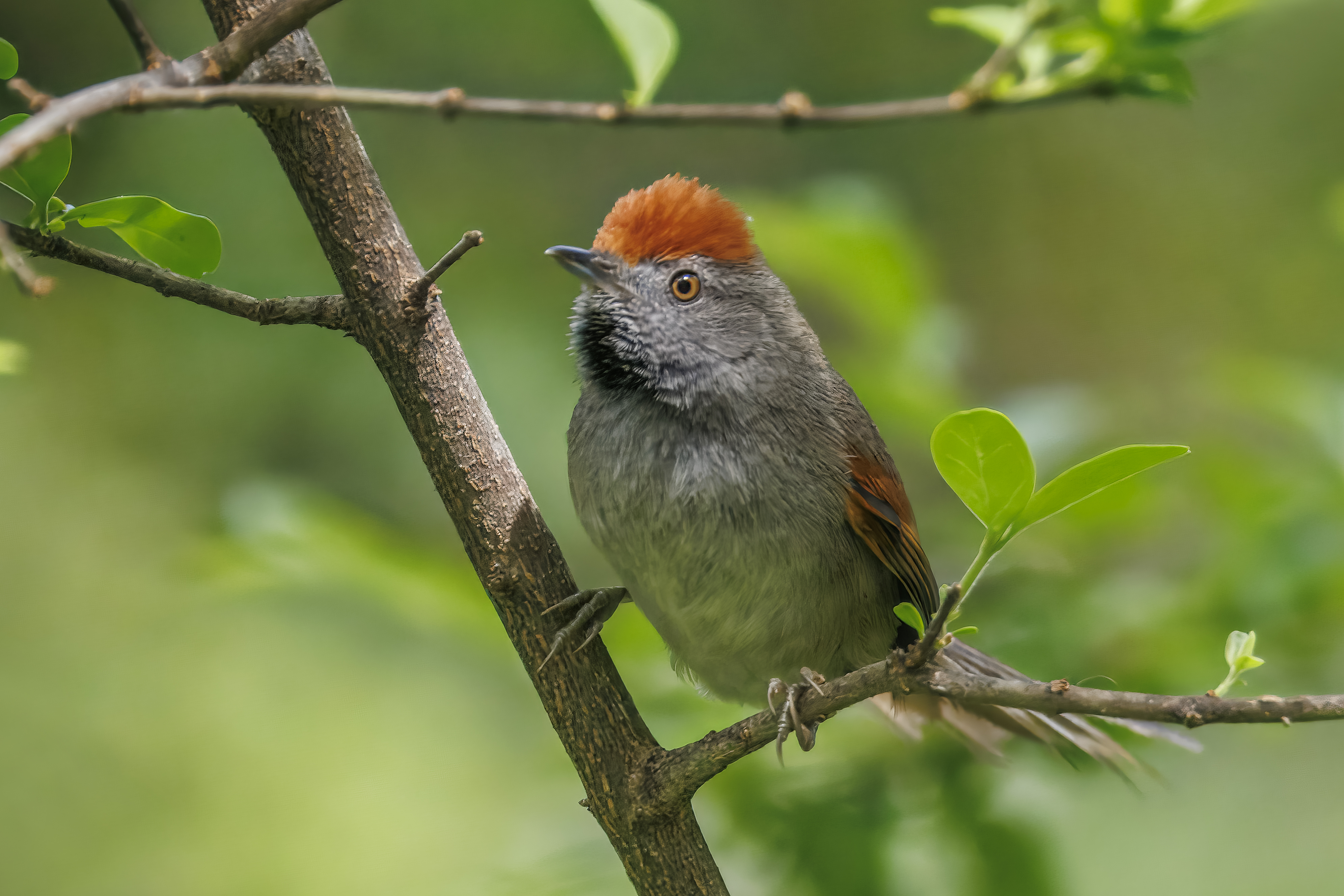
- In Colonia del Sacramento, Uruguay

Conservation status
- Least Concern (IUCN 3.1)

Scientific classification
- Kingdom: Animalia
- Phylum: Chordata
- Class: Aves
- Order: Passeriformes
- Family: Furnariidae
- Genus: Synallaxis
- Species: S. spixi

Binomial name
- Synallaxis spixi Sclater, 1856

= Spix's spinetail =

Species of bird

Spix's spinetail (Synallaxis spixi), previously known as the chicli spinetail, is a species of bird in the Furnariinae subfamily of the ovenbird family Furnariidae. It is found in Argentina, Brazil, Paraguay, and Uruguay.

== Taxonomy and systematics ==
Spix's spinetail is monotypic. However, what is now the cinereous-breasted spinetail (S. hypospodia) was previously treated as a subspecies of it. The two are considered sister species.

The species' English name and specific epithet commemorate the German naturalist Johann Baptist von Spix (1782-1826). The previous name "chicli spinetail" is supposedly onomatopeoic, but does not resemble the species' song. It is thought to have once been more properly applied to the sooty-fronted spinetail (S. frontalis).

== Description ==
Spix's spinetail is 16 to 17 cm (6.3 to 6.7 in) long and weighs about 12 to 15 g (0.42 to 0.53 oz). The sexes have the same plumage. Adults have a pale gray supercilium on an otherwise grayish brown face. Their crown is rufous and their back, rump and uppertail coverts dark brown. Their lesser wing coverts are rufous, their median and greater wing coverts dark brown with wide rufous edges, and their flight feathers dark brown. Their tail is dark brown; it is graduated and the central feathers have pointed tips. Their throat is grayish white; the lower throat feathers are black with grayish edges. Their breast is brownish gray, their belly a paler brownish gray, and their flanks and undertail coverts browner. Their iris is reddish brown to pale orange, their maxilla black, their mandible gray, and their legs and feet gray to greenish gray. Juveniles have a grayish brown crown, ochraceous brown underparts, and a less distinct throat patch than the nominate.

== Distribution and habitat ==
Spix's spinetail is found from Minas Gerais and Espírito Santo in southeastern Brazil south through eastern Paraguay and essentially all of Uruguay into Argentina as far as Buenos Aires Province. It inhabits a wide variety of landscapes in the Atlantic Forest biome, where it tends to stay low in dense undergrowth. Examples include fields and pastures, gallery forest, campo rupestres, restinga, savanna, and brushy second growth. In elevation it ranges from near sea level to 2,200 m (7,200 ft) though in Brazil its maximum is 2,050 m (6,700 ft).

== Behavior ==
=== Movement ===
Spix's spinetail is a year-round resident throughout its range.

=== Feeding ===
The diet of Spix's spinetail is not known in detail but includes insects. It typically forages in pairs, usually in the understorey and sometimes on the ground. It usually stays within about 5 m (16 ft) of the ground but has been observed feeding significantly higher.

=== Breeding ===
The breeding season of Spix's spinetail has not been fully defined but includes November to February. Its nest is an elongated dome of spiny sticks with a long lateral entrance tube, placed in a shrub or bush up to about 2 m (7 ft) above the ground. The inner chamber is lined with softer material such as moss, hair, and small leaves, and almost always shed skins of snakes and lizards. The known clutches ranged from two to five eggs. The incubation period, time to fledging, and details of parental care are not known.

=== Vocalization ===
The song of Spix's spinetail has been described as "a five syllable phrase, last four notes with bubbling quality: sweet! bee bee bee bee . . . . . .sweet! bee bee bee bee . . . ." and a repeated "wee'tiddledidee....wee'tiddledidee". Another vocalization is a "4- or 5-noted 'wuh-wididit' ".

== Status ==
The IUCN has assessed Spix's spinetail as being of Least Concern. It has a large range; its population size is not known but is believed to be increasing. No immediate threats have been identified. It is considered fairly common to very common. It "occupies dense, shrubby second growth; this species probably benefits from deforestation, at least as long as dense, low woody vegetation is retained".
