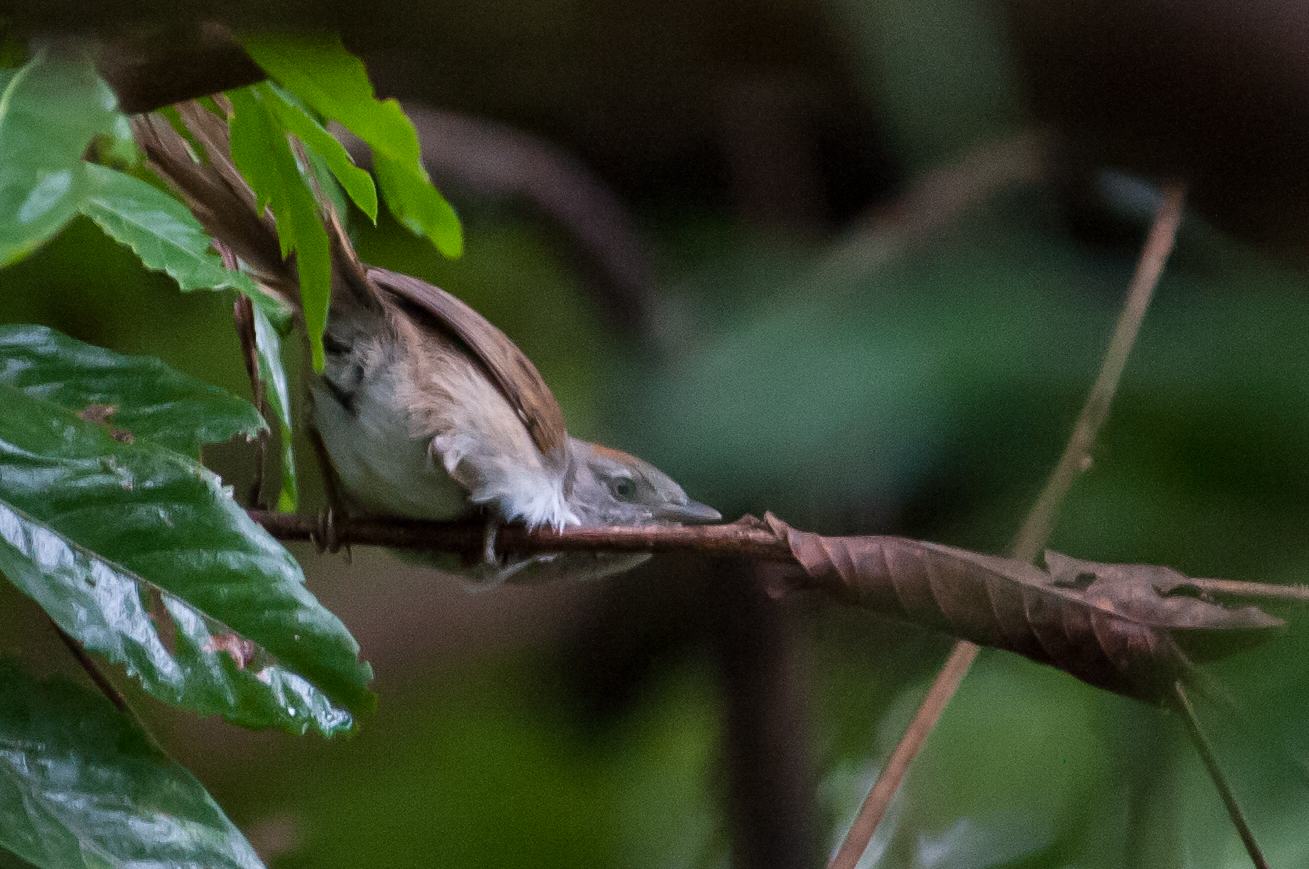

Conservation status
- Near Threatened (IUCN 3.1)

Scientific classification
- Kingdom: Animalia
- Phylum: Chordata
- Class: Aves
- Order: Passeriformes
- Family: Furnariidae
- Genus: Synallaxis
- Species: S. beverlyae

Binomial name
- Synallaxis beverlyae Hilty & Ascanio, 2009

= Río Orinoco spinetail =

Rio Orinoco spinetail

Species of bird

The Rio Orinoco spinetail (Note: The IOC and the Clements taxonomy spell the English name with no diacritics. Some authors spell it Río Orinoco spinetail. The IOC is the Wikipedia standard for bird names.), or Orinoco spinetail, (Synallaxis beverlyae) is a Near Threatened species of bird in the Furnariinae subfamily of the ovenbird family Furnariidae. It is found in Venezuela and possibly Colombia.

== Taxonomy and systematics ==
The Rio Orinoco spinetail was first described in 2009 and was soon accepted as a new species. Its exact relationship to other members of genus Synallaxis is uncertain but it is believed to be closest to the dark-breasted spinetail (S. albigularis). The Rio Orinoco spinetail is monotypic.

== Description ==
The Rio Orinoco spinetail is 13 to 16 cm (5.1 to 6.3 in) long and weighs 11.5 to 14 g (0.41 to 0.49 oz). The sexes have the same plumage. Adults have a whitish supercilium and whitish line beneath the eye on an otherwise gray face and forehead. Their crown is orange-rufous, their nape smoke-gray, and their back, rump and uppertail coverts light grayish brown. Their upperwing coverts are cinnamon-rufous, their greater coverts somewhat olive-brown, and their flight feathers olive-brown. The underside of their wings is grayer than the upperside. Their tail is brownish with a rufescent tinge; it is graduated and the feathers have pointed tips. Their chin and throat are whitish, their upper breast pale gray with a smoky-brown wash, their lower breast and belly dull white tinged with pale clay, their flanks pale clay, and their undertail coverts pale drab beige. Their iris is light grayish to pale brownish yellow, their bill horn-gray with a paler outer half to the mandible, and their legs and feet horn gray.

== Distribution and habitat ==
The Rio Orinoco spinetail is known only from the main channel of the Orinoco River. It has been documented in the river's delta and middle section in Venezuela. It potentially occurs along the river between the known locations but ornithologists have not investigated its entire length. Some authors include the adjacent area of Colombia in the species' range. Because the Colombian records are undocumented sightings, the South American Classification Committee of the American Ornithological Society treats the species as hypothetical in that country, and the Clements taxonomy does not recognize it there. The Rio Orinoco spinetail inhabits scrubby vegetation on river islands and the "mainland" river banks near them, landscapes that are subject to seasonal flooding.

== Behavior ==
=== Movement ===
The Rio Orinoco spinetail is believed to be a year-round resident.

=== Feeding ===
The Rio Orinoco spinetail's diet and foraging behavior are poorly known. It is believed to feed on arthropods by gleaning from vegetation small branches like other members of genus Synallaxis. It is known to usually stay in dense vegetation and forage from the ground up to about 3 m (10 ft) above it.

=== Breeding ===
Nothing is known about the Rio Orinoco spinetail's breeding biology.

=== Vocalization ===
As of late 2023 xeno-canto had no recordings of Rio Orinoco spinetail vocalizations and the Cornell Lab of Ornithology's Macaulay Library had only a few. The species' main vocalization is "a series of 6–9 rapid but well-separated notes, first one accentuated [and that are] not run together in a rattle-trill". It also gives "a longer and more hurried series of notes, also a single loud note".

== Status ==
The IUCN has assessed the Rio Orinoco spinetail as Near Threatened. It has a very restricted range and an unknown population size, though the latter is believed to be stable. No immediate threats have been identified, but its habitat is likely to be affected by subsistence-level cultivation on river islands during low-water seasons, and also increasing tourism on sandy islands.
