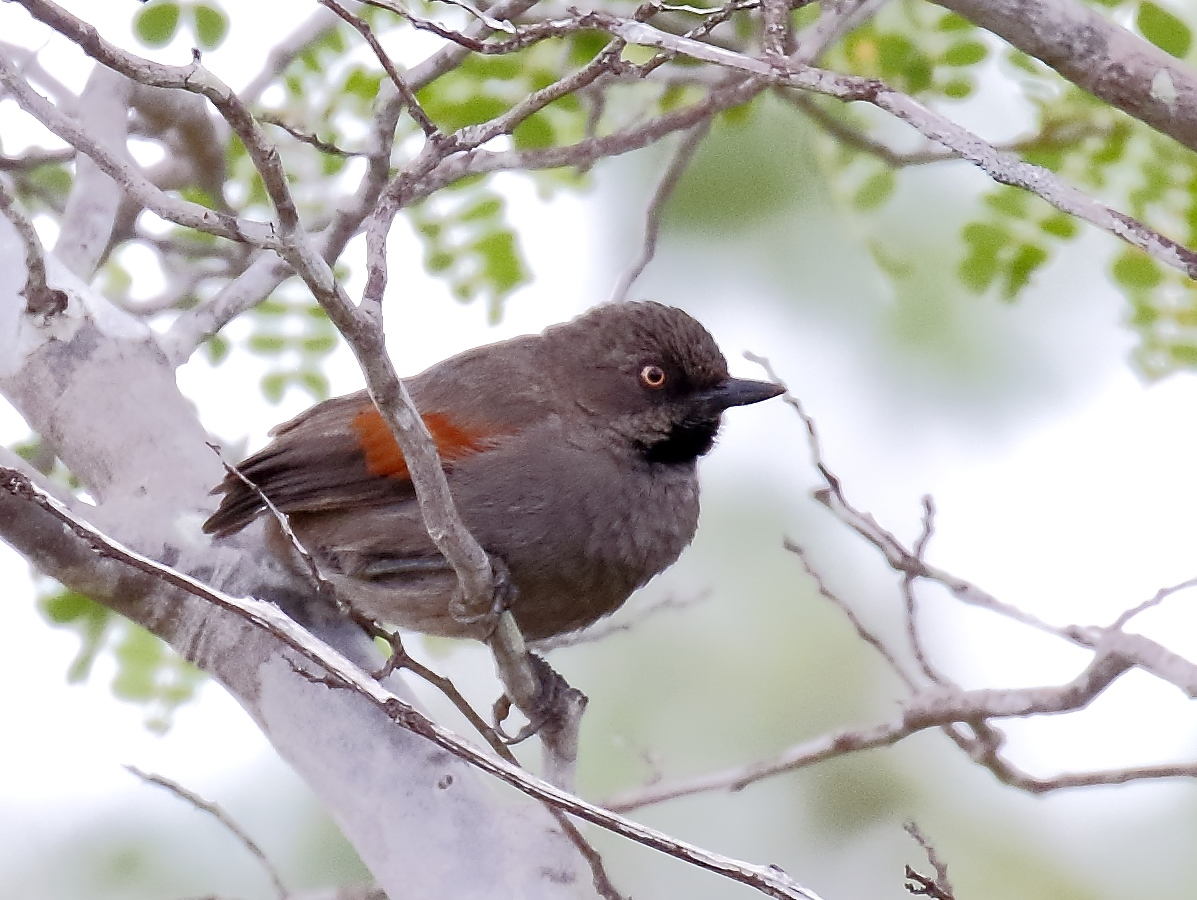

Conservation status
- Least Concern (IUCN 3.1)

Scientific classification
- Kingdom: Animalia
- Phylum: Chordata
- Class: Aves
- Order: Passeriformes
- Family: Furnariidae
- Genus: Synallaxis
- Species: S. hellmayri

Binomial name
- Synallaxis hellmayri Reiser, 1905

Synonyms
- Gyalophylax hellmayri

= Red-shouldered spinetail =

Species of bird

The red-shouldered spinetail (Synallaxis hellmayri) is a species of bird in the Furnariinae subfamily of the ovenbird family Furnariidae. It is endemic to Brazil.

== Taxonomy and systematics ==
The red-shouldered spinetail was long treated as the sole member of genus Gyalophylax but molecular phylogenetic studies show that Gyalophylax is embedded within Synallaxis. The red-shouldered spinetail is monotypic.

== Description ==
The red-shouldered spinetail is 18 to 19 cm (7.1 to 7.5 in) long and weighs 25 to 26 g (0.88 to 0.92 oz). The sexes are thought to have the same plumage. Adults have uniform fuscous brown face, crown, back, rump, and uppertail coverts. Their wing coverts are dull chestnut and their flight feathers brownish gray. Their tail is blackish; it is long and the feathers have blunt tips. Their chin and throat are black. The rest of their underparts are brownish gray with a buffier center to the belly. Their iris is orange to rufescent, their bill black to blackish brown, and their legs and feet gray. Juveniles have grayish wing coverts.

== Distribution and habitat ==
The red-shouldered spinetail is found in eastern Brazil, in an area roughly bounded by Piauí, western Pernambuco, and extreme northern Minas Gerais. It inhabits arid scrubby woodland within the caatinga biome, and favors areas dense with terrestrial bromeliads. In elevation it ranges between 200 and 400 m (700 and 1,300 ft).

== Behavior ==
=== Movement ===
The red-shouldered spinetail is a year-round resident throughout its range.

=== Feeding ===
The red-shouldered spinetail feeds mostly on arthropods but also includes seeds in its diet. It usually forages in pairs, gleaning its prey mainly from leaf litter on the ground but also seeking it in foliage and on small branches up to about 2 m (7 ft) above the ground.

=== Breeding ===
The red-shouldered spinetail's breeding season is thought to be from October to April. Its one known nest was a bulky mass of cactus spines about twice as long as wide, with an upward-slanting entrance tube. Nothing else is known about its breeding biology.

=== Vocalization ===
The red-shouldered spinetail's song is "a loud, fast, accelerating series that fades towards end...usually introduced with 1–4 quiet, widely spaced dry notes". Pairs exchange "tre-tré" or "tchí-krr" calls while foraging. The species' alarm call is a "high, shrill 'quebéc' ".

== Status ==
The IUCN originally assessed the red-shouldered spinetail in 1994 as Vulnerable, then in 2004 as Near Threatened, and since 2017 as being of Least Concern. It has a fairly large range and an unknown population size that is believed to be decreasing. "Despite being more widespread and less habitat-restricted than previously thought, it is still threatened by conversion for agriculture, intensive grazing and burning, and exploitation of woody caatinga for charcoal." It is considered fairly widespread and locally common within its range.
