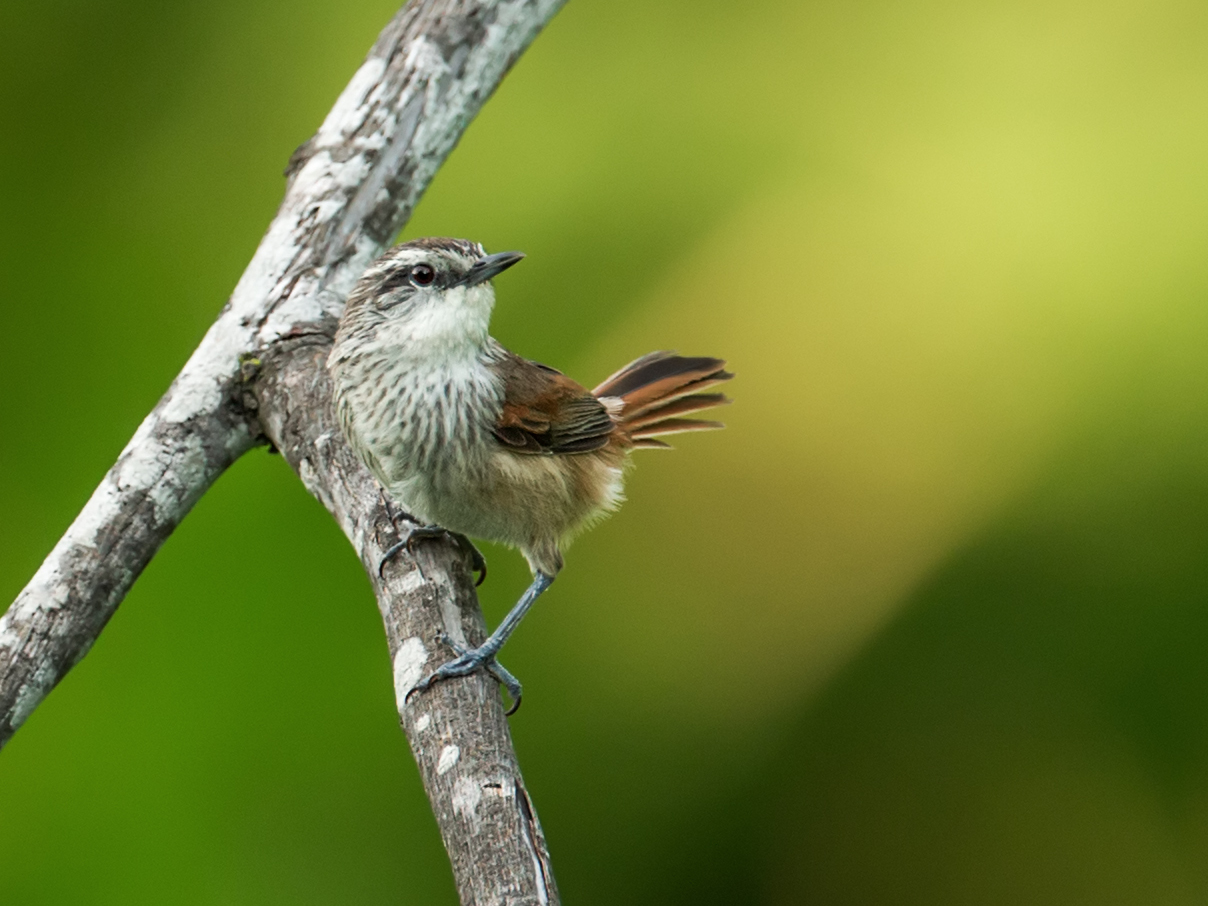

Conservation status
- Least Concern (IUCN 3.1)

Scientific classification
- Kingdom: Animalia
- Phylum: Chordata
- Class: Aves
- Order: Passeriformes
- Family: Furnariidae
- Genus: Synallaxis
- Species: S. stictothorax

Binomial name
- Synallaxis stictothorax Sclater, PL, 1859

= Necklaced spinetail =

Species of bird

The necklaced spinetail (Synallaxis stictothorax) is a species of ovenbird in the family Furnariidae. It is found in Ecuador and Peru.

== Taxonomy and systematics ==
The necklaced spinetail has two subspecies, the nominate S. s. stictothorax (Sclater, PL, 1859) and S. s. maculata (Lawrence, 1872). What is now the Chinchipe spinetail (S. chinchipensis) was long considered a third subspecies. Several publications beginning in 2010 described the morphological, vocal, and phylogenetic differences between them. Based on that evidence, the South American Classification Committee of the American Ornithological Society and the International Ornithological Congress elevated it to species rank in January 2021. The Clements taxonomy followed suit in August 2021.

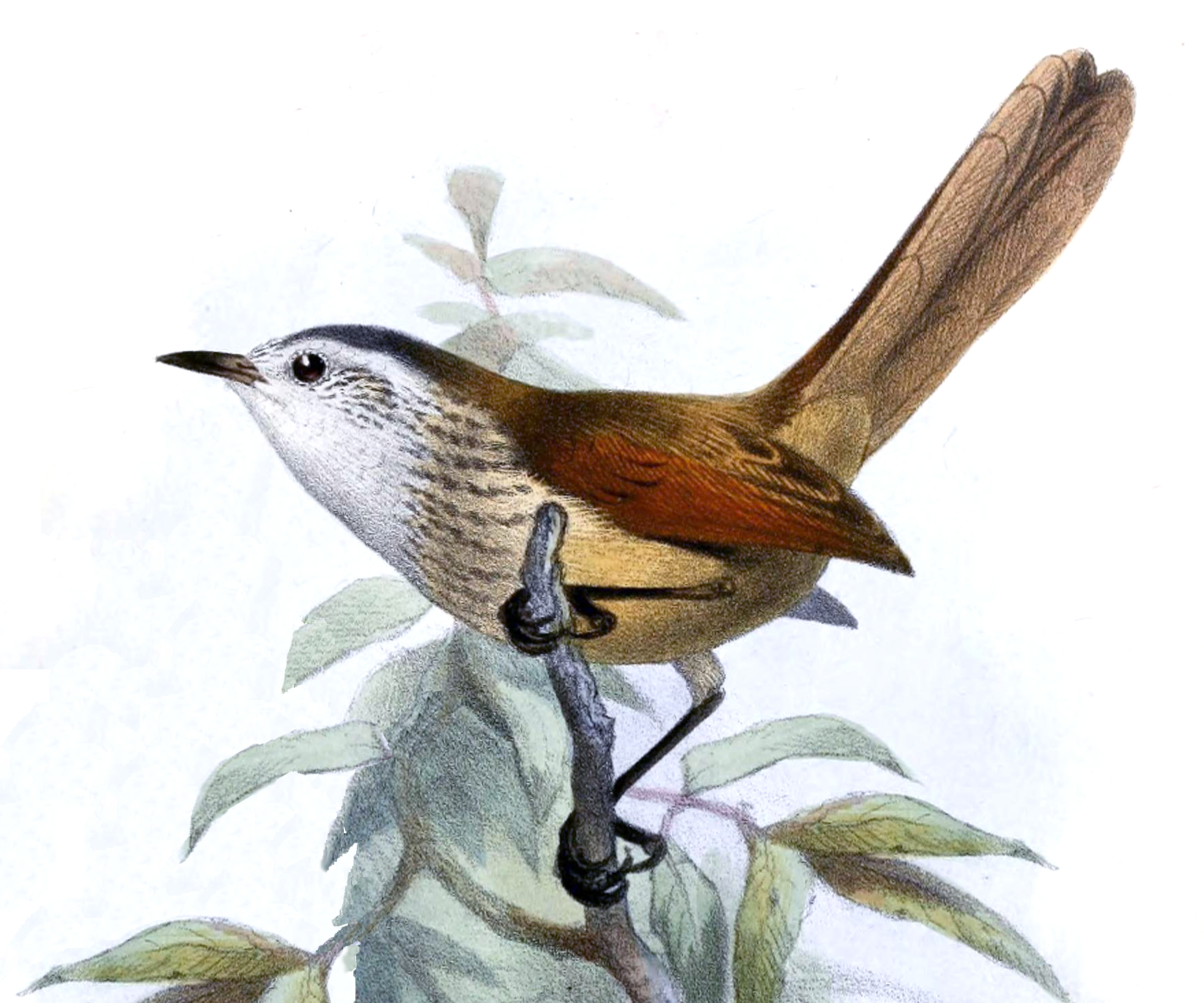
Illustration by Joseph Smit, 1874

== Description ==
The necklaced spinetail is 11 to 13 cm (4.3 to 5.1 in) long and weighs 10 to 14 g (0.35 to 0.49 oz). It is one of the smallest members of genus Synallaxis. The sexes have the same plumage. Adults of the nominate subspecies have a white supercilium on an otherwise blackish face with faint whitish streaks. Their forecrown has black and white streaks. The rest of their crown is dull grayish brown, their back slightly browner, their rump rufescent-brown, and their uppertail coverts bright rufous. The wing has whitish at the bend; the coverts and secondaries are rufous and the primaries dusky. Their tail is bright rufous but for the dark brownish central pair of feathers. Their throat is white, their breast buffy white with fine black streaks, their belly whitish, and their flanks and undertail coverts tawny. Their iris is brown to reddish brown or brownish red, their bill black (sometimes with much gray on the mandible), and their legs and feet blue-gray to dark gray. The juvenile plumage has not been described. Subspecies S. s. maculata has a slightly more rufescent back and more rufous on the wing than the nominate. Its tail is rufous except for a small amount of dusky on the innermost pair of feathers.

== Distribution and habitat ==
The necklaced spinetail has a disjunct distribution. The nominate subspecies is found in southwestern Ecuador from central Manabí Province south to western Guayas Province and Puná Island. Subspecies S. s. maculata is found from southern Loja Province in extreme southwestern Ecuador into northwestern Peru as far south as the Department of La Libertad. The species inhabits arid scrublands and the edges of deciduous forest. In elevation it occurs from near sea level to 300 m (1,000 ft) in Ecuador and 400 m (1,300 ft) in Peru.

== Behavior ==
=== Movement ===
The necklaced spinetail is a year-round resident throughout its range.

=== Feeding ===
The necklaced spinetail feeds on arthropods. It is more arboreal, rather bolder, more easily observed, and more acrobatic when feeding than most other members of genus Synallaxis. It typically forages in pairs, often as part of a mixed-species feeding flock. It gleans its prey from moss, live and dead leaves, and small branches, usually within about 1 or 2 m (3 or 7 ft) of the ground.

=== Breeding ===
The necklaced spinetail's breeding season has not been defined, but active nests have been found in February and March. Its nest is a ball of sticks with a side entrance and an inner chamber lined with feathers and soft seed down. It is typically placed in a thorny tree or cactus up to 12 m (39 ft) above the ground. The clutch size is three to four eggs. The incubation period is about 25 days and fledging occurs 16 to 22 days after hatch. Details of parental care are not known.

=== Vocalization ===
The necklaced spinetail's principal song is "a short stuttering chatter ending with several squeaky emphasized notes...trrr-tr-tr-kweet...kweet". Pairs sing in duet, usually in the early morning and late afternoon, and usually from deep in dense vegetation though sometimes from a visible perch. Its calls include a "long rattled series of notes...which may go up and down in pace and pitch", a "nasal upslurred weet or slightly disyllabic (as in song) kweet", and a "squeaky di'vot".

== Status ==
The IUCN has assessed the necklaced spinetail as being of Least Concern. It has a fairly large range; its population size is not known but is believed to be stable. No immediate threats have been identified. It is considered fairly common and occurs in several protected areas. It "[t]olerates moderate habitat degradation".
