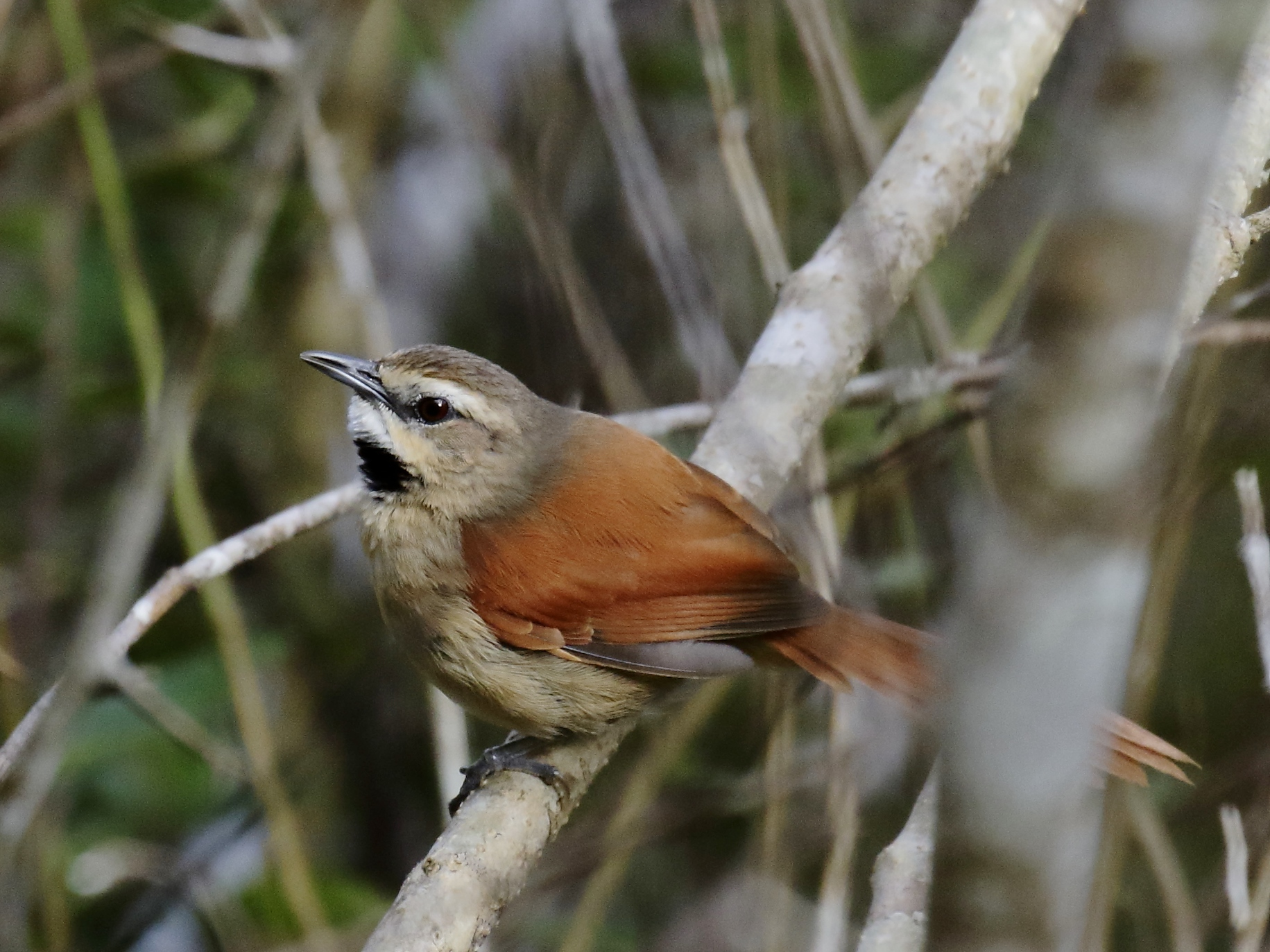

Conservation status
- Least Concern (IUCN 3.1)

Scientific classification
- Kingdom: Animalia
- Phylum: Chordata
- Class: Aves
- Order: Passeriformes
- Family: Furnariidae
- Genus: Synallaxis
- Species: S. scutata

Binomial name
- Synallaxis scutata Sclater, PL, 1859

= Ochre-cheeked spinetail =

Species of bird

The ochre-cheeked spinetail (Synallaxis scutata) is a species of bird in the Furnariinae subfamily of the ovenbird family Furnariidae. It is found in Argentina, Bolivia, Brazil, Paraguay, and Peru.

== Taxonomy and systematics ==
The ochre-cheeked spinetail and two other spinetails have been placed by some authors in genus Poecilurus but there are insufficient plumage, behavioral, and genetic differences to support that treatment. The ochre-cheeked spinetail is not even closely related to the other two but is a sister species to the grey-bellied spinetail (S. cinerascens).

Beyond the confirmation that the ochre-cheeked spinetail belongs in genus Synallaxis its taxonomy is unsettled. The International Ornithological Committee and BirdLife International's Handbook of the Birds of the World assign it two subspecies, the nominate S. s. scutata (Sclater, PL, 1859) and S. s. whitii (Sclater, PL, 1881). The Clements taxonomy adds a third, S. s. teretiala (Owen, 1985) that the other two systems include within the nominate. Remsen (2020) states that teretiala and a proposed subspecies neglecta are indistinguishable from the nominate.

This article follows the two-subspecies model.

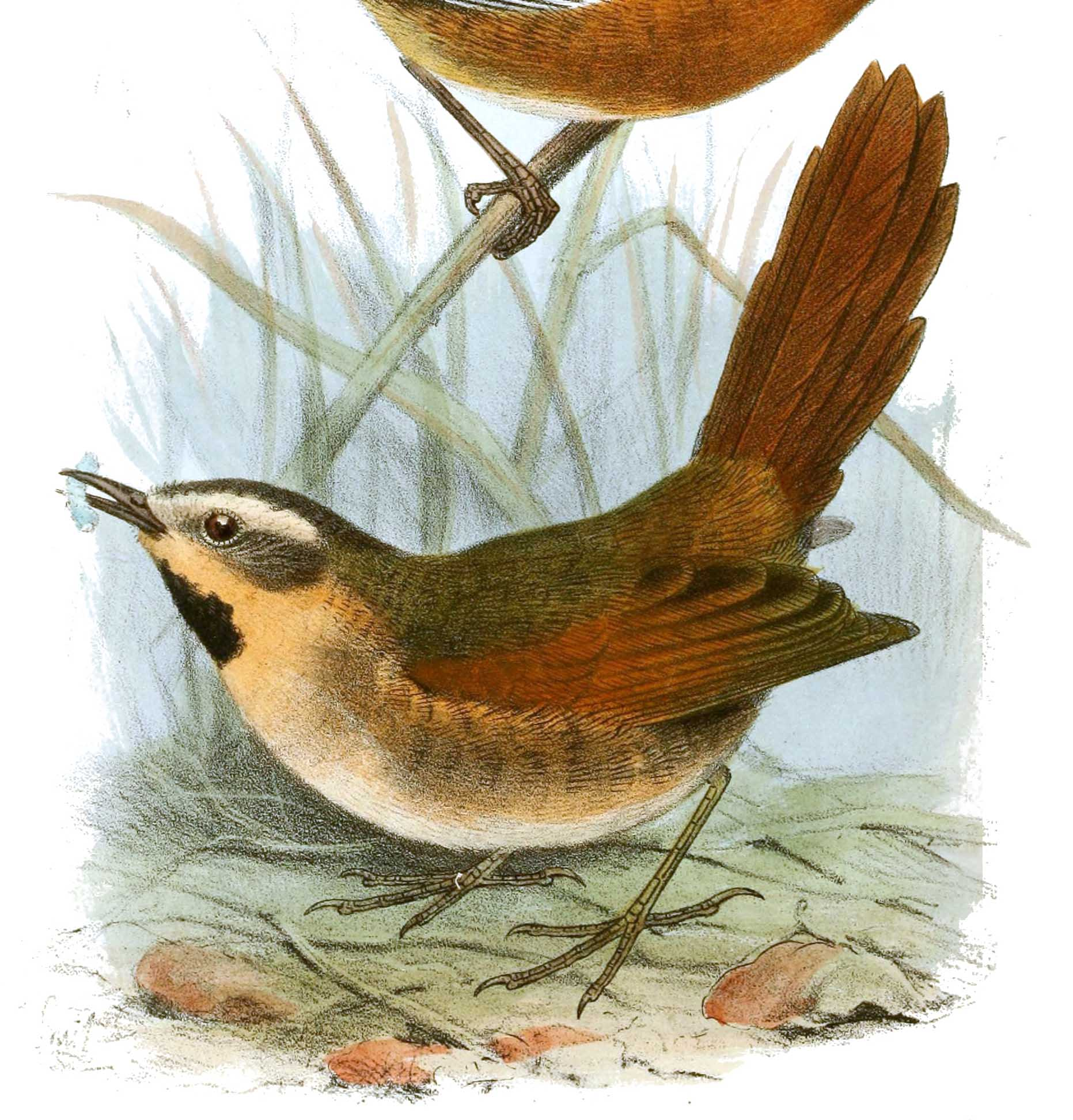
Illustration by Joseph Smit, 1881

== Description ==
The ochre-cheeked spinetail is 13 to 14 cm (5.1 to 5.5 in) long and weighs 12 to 19 g (0.42 to 0.67 oz). The sexes have the same plumage. Adults of the nominate subspecies have a wide white supercilium, blackish lores, a fuzzy dark brownish line behind the eye, and ochraceous ear coverts and malar region. Their forehead has a blackish spot. Their crown and upper back are grayish brown and the rest of their back is dark rufous that narrows to the rump, replace by grayish brown. Their uppertail coverts are rufous. Their wings are mostly dark rufous with dark brownish lesser coverts and primary tips. Their tail is rufous; the tips of the feathers have no barbs giving a spiny appearance. Their throat is white with a black crescent on its lower part. Their breast is pinkish brown to pale ochraceous buff that becomes more ochraceous by the undertail coverts; the belly is paler and has a white center. Their iris is dark chestnut to reddish brown or brown, their maxilla black to dark gray, their mandible gray to blue-gray (sometimes with a dark tip), and their legs and feet greenish gray to yellowish olive. Juveniles have faint dark scallops on the breast. Subspecies S. s. whitii has uniform brown upperparts with no rufous, with darker rufous wings and tail and deeper ochraceous face and underparts than the nominate.

== Distribution and habitat ==
The nominate subspecies of the ochre-cheeked spinetail is found in eastern and central Brazil. Subspecies S. s. whitii is found in southern Brazil's Mato Grosso state, southeastern Bolivia, extreme northwestern Paraguay, and northwestern Argentina in Jujuy and Salta provinces and perhaps as far south as Catamarca Province. The species is also found in southeastern Peru and northwestern Bolivia; these individuals might belong to whitii or represent an undescribed subspecies.

The ochre-cheeked spinetail generally inhabits the undergrowth and edges of semi-deciduous and deciduous forest; in Brazil the forest is found in caatinga and cerrado ecoregions. In elevation it ranges from near sea level to 1,700 m (5,600 ft).

== Behavior ==
=== Movement ===
The ochre-cheeked spinetail is a year-round resident throughout its range.

=== Feeding ===
The ochre-cheeked spinetail feeds on arthropods. It typically forages in pairs and occasionally joins mixed-species feeding flocks. It gleans most of its prey from the ground.

=== Breeding ===
The ochre-cheeked spinetail is thought to breed during the austral spring and summer or the local wet season. Eggs have been noted in eastern Brazil in April and nestlings have been seen in Argentina in November. Its nest is a mass of twigs, roots, and dead leaves that can be twice as long as it is wide; a horizontal tube leads to the egg chamber. It is placed on the ground where it resembles a pile of debris. The clutch size is two to three eggs. The incubation period, time to fledging, and details of parental care are not known.

=== Vocalization ===
The ochre-cheeked spinetail's song is an "extr. high, thin 'fweeet puh-wit', 1st part upslurred, 2nd note lower pitched than 1st and 3rd". It is "constantly repeated at 1-sec. intervals".

== Status ==
The IUCN has assessed the ochre-cheeked spinetail as being of Least Concern. It has a very large range and an unknown population size that is believed to be decreasing. No immediate threats have been identified. It is considered uncommon to locally fairly common and occurs in a few protected areas.
