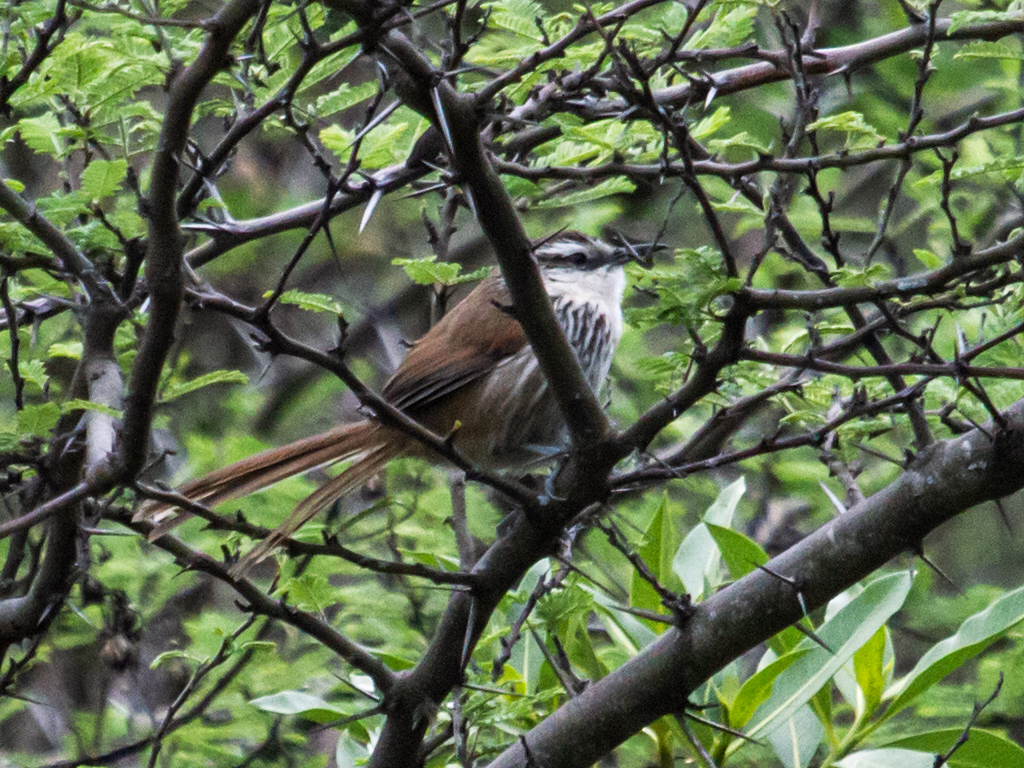

Conservation status
- Near Threatened (IUCN 3.1)

Scientific classification
- Kingdom: Animalia
- Phylum: Chordata
- Class: Aves
- Order: Passeriformes
- Family: Furnariidae
- Genus: Synallaxis
- Species: S. hypochondriaca

Binomial name
- Synallaxis hypochondriaca (Salvin, 1895)

Synonyms
- Siptornopsis hypochondriaca

= Great spinetail =

Species of bird

The great spinetail (Synallaxis hypochondriaca) is a Near Threatened species of bird in the Furnariinae subfamily of the ovenbird family Furnariidae. It is endemic to Peru.

== Taxonomy and systematics ==
The great spinetail was formerly considered monotypic within the genus Siptornopsis but molecular phylogenetic studies have shown that the previous genus is embedded within Synallaxis. It remains monotypic.

== Description ==
The great spinetail is 17 to 19 cm (6.7 to 7.5 in) long and weighs 23 to 26 g (0.81 to 0.92 oz). It is a large, long-tailed, furnariid. The sexes have the same plumage. Adults have a wide white supercilium, dusky lores and ear coverts, and a creamy whitish malar area. Their crown is dull brown with faint buffy streaks on the forehead. Their back is a lighter brown and their rump and uppertail coverts grayish brown. Their wing coverts are rufous to brownish rufous and the flight feathers dusky with tawny edges. Their tail is graduated and dusky brown. Their throat is white, their breast and flanks white with brown-gray streaks, and their belly and undertail coverts plain white. Their iris is chestnut to reddish brown, their maxilla blue-black with a dusky tip, their mandible black to dark gray, and their legs and feet blue-gray. Juveniles have less streaking on their underparts than adults, with a paler, pinker, mandible.

== Distribution and habitat ==
The great spinetail is found in the upper valley of the Marañón River in northern Peru. It occurs in parts of four departments: southern Amazonas, southeastern Cajamarca, eastern La Libertad and northern Ancash. It inhabits arid montane landscapes with dense scrub, cactus, and Acacia, Bombax, and Alnus trees. In elevation it ranges from 2,000 to 2,800 m (6,600 to 9,200 ft) and possibly to 3,000 m (9,800 ft).

== Behavior ==
=== Movement ===
The great spinetail is a year-round resident throughout its range.

=== Feeding ===
The great spinetail feeds on arthropods but details are lacking. It usually forages singly, in pairs, or in small family groups, gleaning its prey from foliage and small branches (and occasionally the ground) up to about 2 m (7 ft) above the ground.

=== Breeding ===
The great spinetail's nest is a large globe of thorny sticks with a side entrance. Nothing else is known about its breeding biology.

=== Vocalization ===
The great spinetail's song is "a loud, and rapid spluttering accelerating/decelerating chatter of thk notes that rise and fall, interspersed with nasal dew notes". It is commonly sung in duet. Its calls include "a metallic TCHEE-TCHEE or a much longer tu-ter-CHEE-CHEE-CHEE with the number of CHEE notes slightly variable".

== Status ==
The IUCN originally assessed the great spinetail as Vulnerable but since 2020 has rated it as Near Threatened. It has a limited range and its estimated population of 6000 to 15,000 mature individuals is believed to be decreasing. "The species is strictly dependent on montane arid srub and as such it is sensitive to habitat loss and degradation...The Marañón drainage has been under cultivation for a long time and habitat in the valley has progressively deteriorated."
