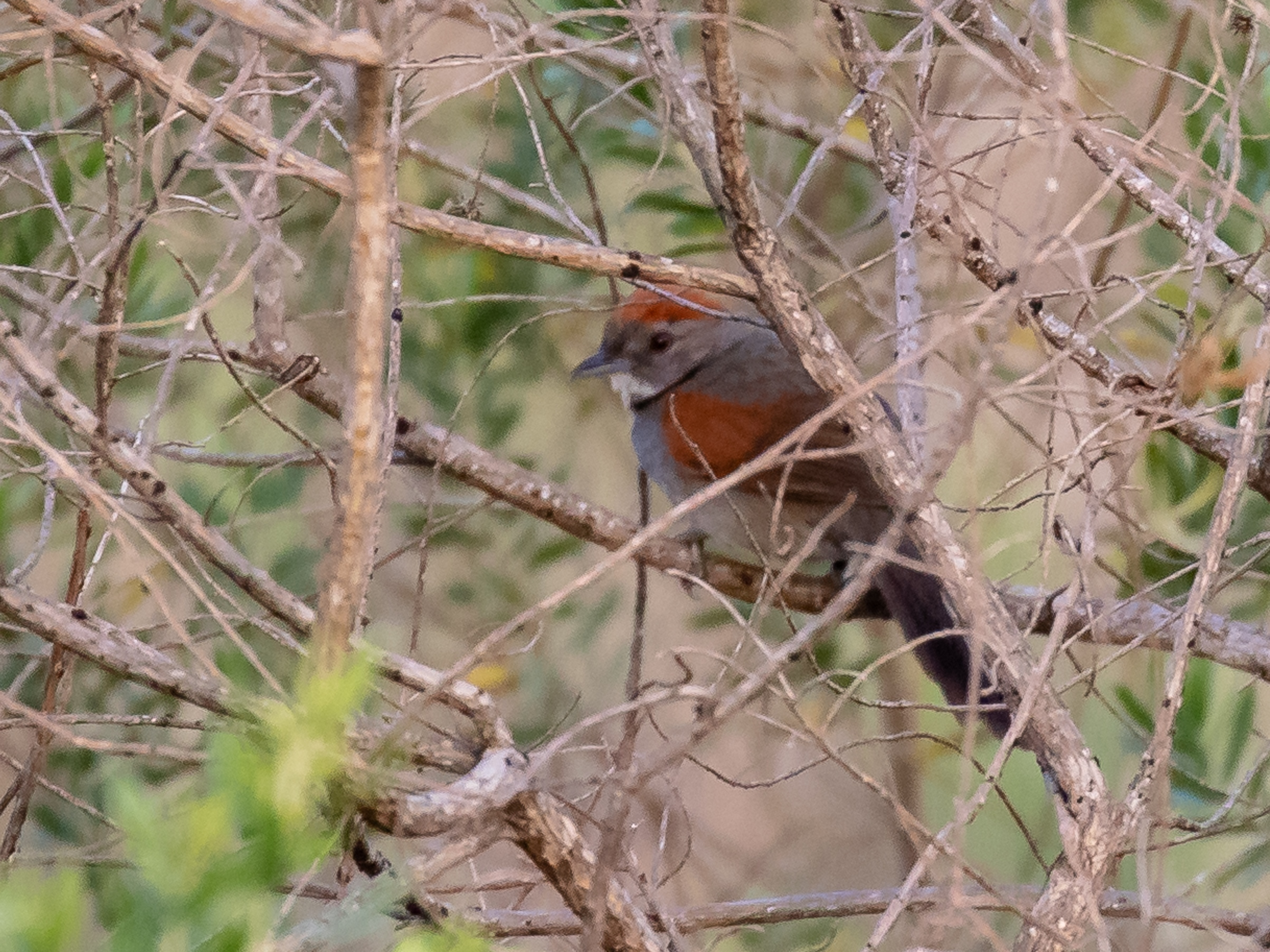

Conservation status
- Least Concern (IUCN 3.1)

Scientific classification
- Kingdom: Animalia
- Phylum: Chordata
- Class: Aves
- Order: Passeriformes
- Family: Furnariidae
- Genus: Synallaxis
- Species: S. hypospodia

Binomial name
- Synallaxis hypospodia Sclater, PL, 1874

= Cinereous-breasted spinetail =

Species of bird

The cinereous-breasted spinetail (Synallaxis hypospodia) is a species of bird in the Furnariinae subfamily of the ovenbird family Furnariidae. It is found in Bolivia, Brazil, Paraguay, and Peru.

== Taxonomy and systematics ==
The cinereous-breasted spinetail was previously treated as a subspecies of Spix's spinetail (S. spixi); the two are now considered sister species. The cinereous-breasted spinetail is monotypic.

== Description ==
The cinereous-breasted spinetail is 15 to 16 cm (5.9 to 6.3 in) long and weighs 15 to 18 g (0.53 to 0.63 oz). The sexes have the same plumage. Adults have a faint gray supercilium on an otherwise gray-brown face. Their forecrown is dark gray-brown, their crown and nape chestnut-rufous, and their back, rump and uppertail coverts dark brown. Their wing coverts are chestnut-rufous and their flight feathers dark brown with rufescent edges. Their tail is a darker brown than the back; it is graduated and the feathers have rounded tips. Their chin and throat are mostly whitish; the lower throat feathers are blackish with whitish edges. Their breast is brownish gray ("cinereous" means ash-colored), their belly whitish, and their flanks and undertail coverts brownish. Their iris is reddish brown, their maxilla black, their mandible silvery gray to grayish horn, and their legs and feet olive or grayish olive to brownish yellow. Juveniles have a gray-brown crown, mostly ochraceous clay-brown underparts, and a less distinct throat patch than the nominate.

== Distribution and habitat ==
The cinereous-breasted spinetail has a disjunct distribution. One population is found in far eastern Peru's Department of Madre de Dios, northern and eastern Bolivia, and Brazil's western Amazon Basin. Another is found from Ceará and Alagoas in northeastern Brazil southwest through Mato Grosso do Sul slightly into southeastern Bolivia and northeastern Paraguay. There are also records at scattered locations throughout central Peru, but some of these are suspected to be misidentifications.

The cinereous-breasted spinetail inhabits a variety of open landscapes including seasonally wet grassland, scrublands, campina, and savannah. Within them it favors areas near water. In elevation it ranges from near sea level to about 700 m (2,300 ft).

== Behavior ==
=== Movement ===
The cinereous-breasted spinetail is a year-round resident throughout its range.

=== Feeding ===
The diet and foraging behavior of the cinereous-breasted spinetail are not well known. It is thought to feed on arthropods that it gleans from foliage and small branches, staying about 1 to 2 m (3 to 7 ft) above the ground. It is usually seen in pairs.

=== Breeding ===
Nothing is known about the breeding biology of the cinereous-breasted spinetail.

=== Vocalization ===
Remsen describes the cinereous-breasted spinetail's principal vocalization as "a hurried and loud chatter on same pitch, 'chéw, chew-chee-chee-chee-ee-ee-ee-ee-ee-eu', accelerating at end". As described by vanPerlo, it is a "high, sharp 'tut-Drrrrrrruh' (last part staccato and slightly descending)".

== Status ==
The IUCN has assessed the cinereous-breasted spinetail as being of Least Concern. It has a large range; its population size is not known but is believed to be stable. No immediate threats have been identified. It is considered locally common to fairly common but is poorly known.
