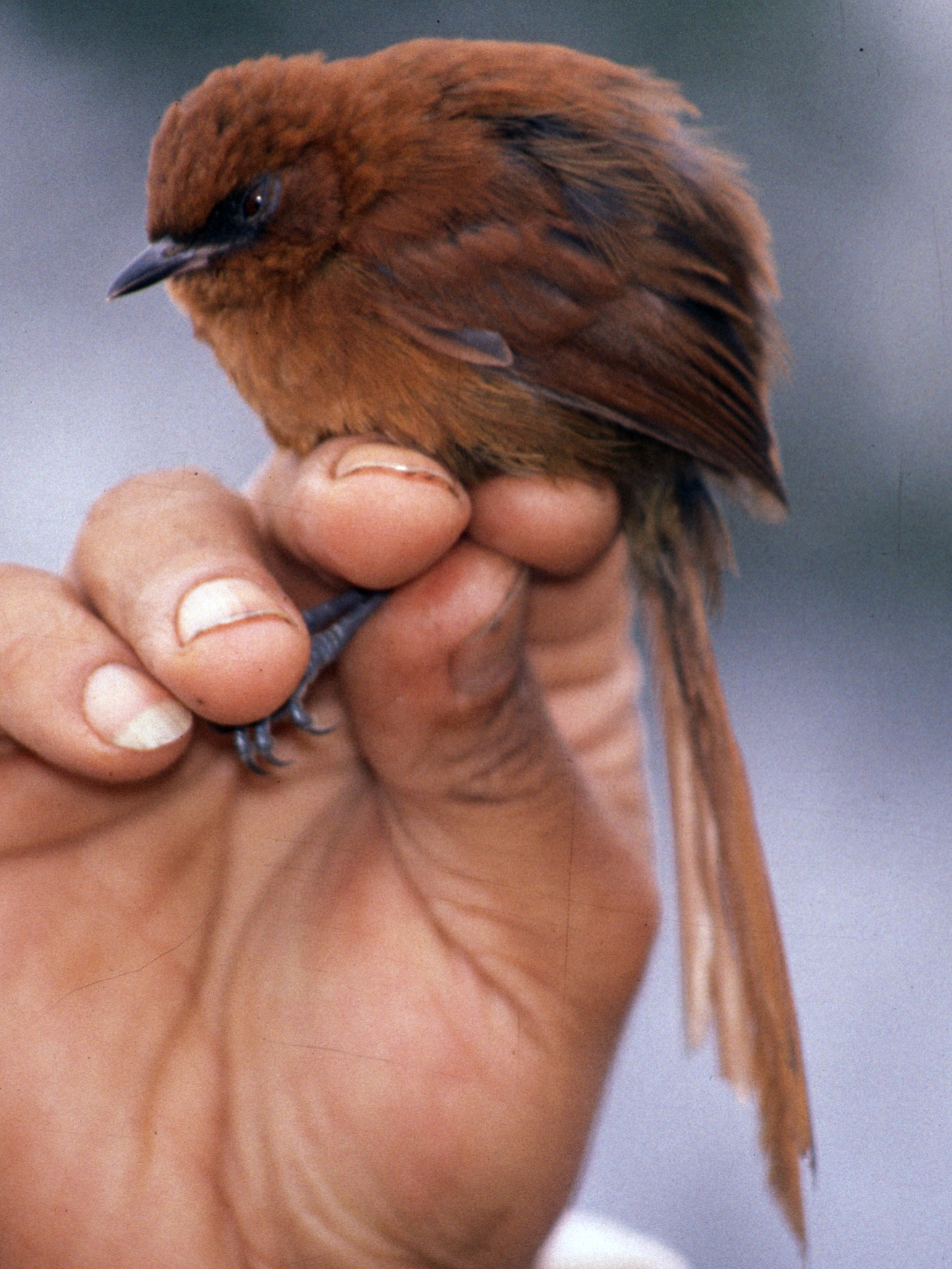
- Rufous spinetail (Synallaxis unirufa)

Scientific classification
- Kingdom: Animalia
- Phylum: Chordata
- Class: Aves
- Order: Passeriformes
- Family: Furnariidae
- Genus: Synallaxis; Vieillot, 1818

Type species
- Synallaxis ruficapilla Vieillot, 1819

Species
- see list

= Synallaxis =

Genus of birds

Synallaxis is a genus of birds in the ovenbird family, Furnariidae. It is one of the most diverse genera in the family and is composed of small birds that inhabit dense undergrowth across tropical and subtropical habitats in the Neotropical region. Some species show contrasting plumage patterns involving rufous crown and wing patches and black throat patches but they are difficult to see as they keep ensconced in vegetation most of the time. Most species show the long graduated tail with pointy feathers that is typical of spinetails. They are also characterized by constructing large domed nests with stick, including a long entrance tube. Some species can be difficult to distinguish from one another on the basis of their plumage, but can be told apart by their vocalizations, which can be quite distinctive.

== Taxonomy ==
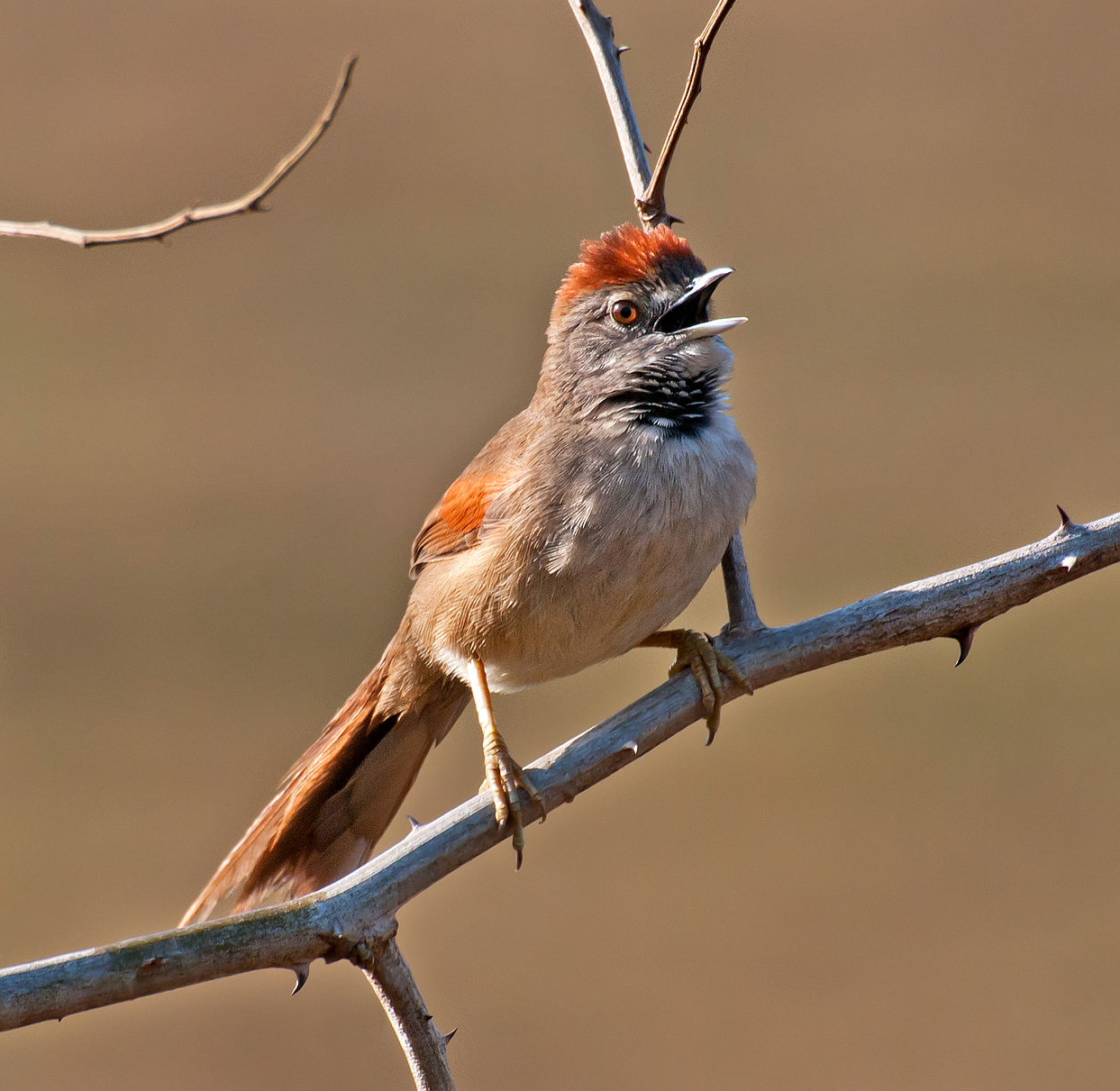
Synallaxis albescens

The genus Synallaxis was introduced in 1818 by the French ornithologist Louis Pierre Vieillot. The name is from the Ancient Greek sunallaxis meaning "exchange". Vieillot did not specify a type species but in 1840 George Gray designated the rufous-capped spinetail.

The genus contains 37 species:

Image	Scientific name	Common name	Distribution
	Ochre-cheeked spinetail	Synallaxis scutata	Brazil, eastern Bolivia and northwestern Argentina
	Grey-bellied spinetail	Synallaxis cinerascens	southern Brazil, eastern Paraguay, Uruguay and Selva Misionera
	Plain-crowned spinetail	Synallaxis gujanensis	Guianas, southern Amazonia and Colombia
	Araguaia spinetail	Synallaxis simoni	Goiás
	White-lored spinetail	Synallaxis albilora	Pantanal
	Maranon spinetail	Synallaxis maranonica	lower Marañón River
	Great spinetail	Synallaxis hypochondriaca	upper Marañón River
	Chinchipe spinetail	Synallaxis chichipensis	Chinchipe and Maranon river
	Necklaced spinetail	Synallaxis stictothorax	Tumbes
	Russet-bellied spinetail	Synallaxis zimmeri	western Peru
	Slaty spinetail	Synallaxis brachyura	Central America and Tumbes-Chocó-Magdalena
	Silvery-throated spinetail	Synallaxis subpudica	Cordillera Oriental (Colombia)
	Red-shouldered spinetail	Synallaxis hellmayri	Caatinga
	Rufous-capped spinetail	Synallaxis ruficapilla	southern Atlantic Forest
	Bahia spinetail	Synallaxis cinerea	Bahia
	Pinto's spinetail	Synallaxis infuscata	Pernambuco forests
	Dusky spinetail	Synallaxis moesta	eastern Northern Andes
	McConnell's spinetail	Synallaxis macconnelli	tepuis and Guiana Shield
	Cabanis's spinetail	Synallaxis cabanisi	eastern Central Andes
	Cinereous-breasted spinetail	Synallaxis hypospodia	Cerrado, Caatinga and central Southern Amazonia
	Spix's spinetail	Synallaxis spixi	northeastern Brazil to northeastern Argentina
	Dark-breasted spinetail	Synallaxis albigularis	western Amazonia
	Rio Orinoco spinetail	Synallaxis beverlyae	Venezuela
	Pale-breasted spinetail	Synallaxis albescens	South America
	Sooty-fronted spinetail	Synallaxis frontalis	central/eastern South America
	Azara's spinetail	Synallaxis azarae	Andes
	Apurimac spinetail	Synallaxis courseni	Ampay
	White-whiskered spinetail	Synallaxis candei	northern Colombia and northwestern Venezuela
	Rufous-breasted spinetail	Synallaxis erythrothorax	southeastern Mexico and northern Central America
	Hoary-throated spinetail	Synallaxis kollari	Branco River and tributaries
	Blackish-headed spinetail	Synallaxis tithys	Tumbes
	Rusty-headed spinetail	Synallaxis fuscorufa	Sierra Nevada de Santa Marta
	Rufous spinetail	Synallaxis unirufa	northern Andes
	Black-throated spinetail	Synallaxis castanea	central Venezuelan Coastal Range
	Stripe-breasted spinetail	Synallaxis cinnamomea	mountains of northeastern Colombia and Venezuela ; Trinidad-and-Tobago
	Ruddy spinetail	Synallaxis rutilans	Amazonia
	Chestnut-throated spinetail	Synallaxis cherriei	Amazonia (scattered range)

Formerly, some authorities also considered the following species as species within the genus Synallaxis:

- White-browed spinetail (as Synallaxis gularis)
- Chotoy spinetail (as Synallaxis phryganophila)
- White-bellied spinetail (as Synallaxis propinqua)
