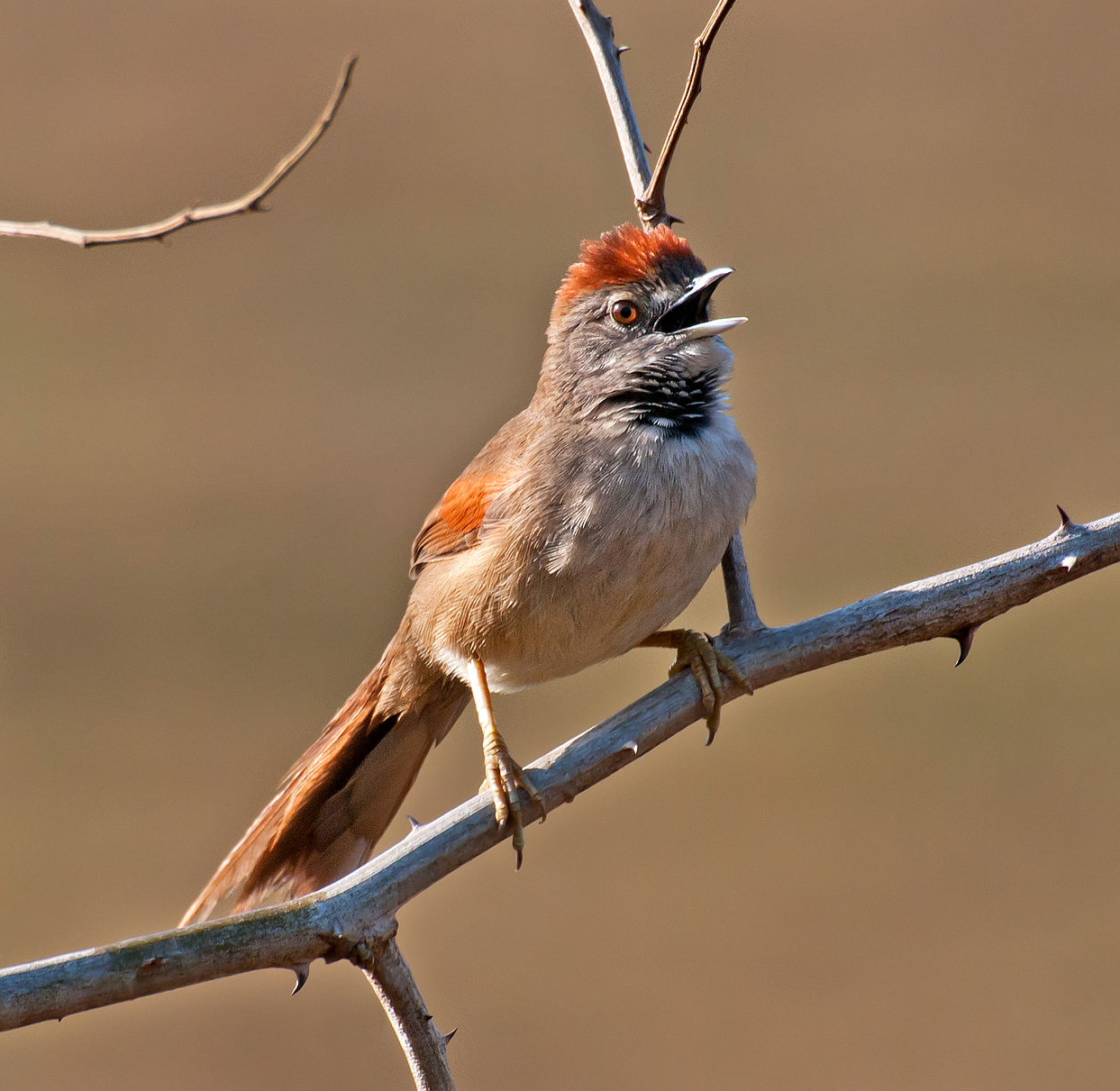
- At Piraju, São Paulo State, Brazil

Conservation status
- Least Concern (IUCN 3.1)

Scientific classification
- Kingdom: Animalia
- Phylum: Chordata
- Class: Aves
- Order: Passeriformes
- Family: Furnariidae
- Genus: Synallaxis
- Species: S. albescens

Binomial name
- Synallaxis albescens Temminck, 1823

= Pale-breasted spinetail =

Species of bird

The pale-breasted spinetail (Synallaxis albescens) is a passerine bird in the Furnariinae subfamily of the ovenbird family Furnariidae. It is found in Costa Rica, Panama, Trinidad, and in every mainland South American country except Chile and Ecuador.

== Taxonomy and systematics ==
The pale-breasted spinetail's taxonomy is in flux. The International Ornithological Committee (IOC) recognizes these 11 subspecies:

- S. a. latitabunda Bangs, 1907
- S. a. insignis Zimmer, JT, 1935
- S. a. occipitalis Madarász, G, 1903
- S. a. littoralis Todd, 1948
- S. a. perpallida Todd, 1916
- S. a. nesiotis Clark, AH, 1902
- S. a. trinitatis Zimmer, JT, 1935
- S. a. josephinae Chubb, C, 1919
- S. a. inaequalis Zimmer, JT, 1935
- S. a. albescens Temminck, 1823
- S. a. australis Zimmer, JT, 1935

The Clements taxonomy recognizes two more subspecies, S. a. hypoleuca (Ridgway, 1909) and S. a. griseonota (Todd, 1948). The IOC includes hypoleuca within latitabunda and griseonota within inaequalis. BirdLife International's Handbook of the Birds of the World does not recognize the two Clements entries nor trinitatis.

What is now the dark-breasted spinetail (S. albigularis) was previously treated by some authors as conspecific with the pale-breasted spinetail. Some now treat them as sister species.

This article follows the IOC 11-subspecies model.

== Description ==
The pale-breasted spinetail is 13 to 16 cm (5.1 to 6.3 in) long and weighs 9 to 17 g (0.32 to 0.60 oz). It is slightly smaller and has a shorter bill than most other members of genus Synallaxis. The sexes have the same plumage. Adults of the nominate subspecies S. a. albescens have a pale brownish gray face with an even paler line through the eye. Their forehead is olive grayish brown and their crown dark rufous, often with slight mottling. Their back, rump and uppertail coverts are olive-brown. Their wing coverts are rufous and their flight feathers tawny-brownish. Their tail is olive-brown with a variable rufescent tinge on the outer feathers; it is graduated and the feathers have somewhat pointed tips. Their throat is whitish with black flecks in its lower part. Their breast is pale buffy gray, their belly a paler buffy gray, and their flanks and undertail coverts browner than the belly. Their iris is yellowish to light brown or brown, their maxilla black to dark gray, their mandible blackish to gray (sometimes with a dark tip to the gray), and their legs and feet yellowish brown to grayish olive or brownish yellow. Juveniles have a brownish gray crown, and compared to adults they have paler and more rufescent upperparts, an almost white throat, and paler underparts with an almost white center to the belly.

The other 10 subspecies of the pale-breasted spinetail differ from the nominate and each other thus:

- S. a. latitabunda: darker than the nominate with browner tail and flanks
- S. a. insignis: more extensive grayish of the forehead and a smaller rufous crown than the nominate, with a paler and brownish-tinged back and a paler and less grayish breast
- S. a. occipitalis: darker than the nominate with a blackish forehead
- S. a. littoralis: more brownish upperparts than insignis and underparts less grayish than the nominate
- S. a. perpallida: darker than the nominate with more grayish upperparts, darker rufous crown and wing coverts, and a very white belly
- S. a. nesiotis: paler crown and shoulders (with a yellowish tinge) than the nominate, with paler and grayer upperparts and whiter underparts
- S. a. trinitatis: darker crown and wing coverts and a more buff-brown back than the nominate
- S. a. josephinae: darker than nesiotis with a darker face, a less buffy back, a more grayish breast, and darker brownish flanks
- S. a. inaequalis: much paler than josephinae with lighter rufous crown and wing coverts, a grayish tinged back, whiter throat and belly, and pale gray to whitish breast
- S. a. australis: similar to the nominate, with olive tips on the crown feathers and a duller and more grayish brown back

== Distribution and habitat ==
The subspecies of the pale-breasted spinetail are found thus:

- S. a. latitabunda: southwestern Costa Rica and the Pacific coasts of southern Panama and northwestern Colombia
- S. a. insignis: northern and central Colombia and Venezuela's Apure state
- S. a. occipitalis: mountains of north-central Colombia and northwestern Venezuela
- S. a. littoralis: coastal northern Colombia
- S. a. perpallida: Colombia's Guajira Peninsula and far northwestern Venezuela
- S. a. nesiotis: Colombia's Sierra Nevada de Santa Marta east into northern Venezuela; also Isla Margarita
- S. a. trinitatis: Trinidad and eastern Venezuela
- S. a. josephinae: southern Venezuela, Guyana, Suriname, and northern Brazil's Roraima state
- S. a. inaequalis: French Guiana and north-central and northeastern Brazil
- S. a. albescens: eastern and southern Brazil from Maranhão and Pernambuco to Mato Grosso and Paraná, eastern Paraguay, and northeastern Argentina's Misiones Province
- S. a. australis: southeastern Peru's Department of Madre de Dios, central and eastern Bolivia, Paraguay, Argentina south to La Pampa and Buenos Aire provinces, and western Uruguay.

The pale-breasted spinetail inhabits a wide variety of open grassy landscapes. These include savanna, cerrado, campo rupestre, shrub-steppe, brushy areas in woodlands, pastures, and the edges of secondary forest, marshes, and roadsides. In elevation it is generally found below 1,500 m (4,900 ft). In Central America it occurs below 1,250 m (4,100 ft) and in Colombia up to 1,800 m (5,900 ft).

== Behavior ==
=== Movement ===
The pale-breasted spinetail is believed to be a year-round resident in most of its range, though the farthest southern sub-population might make some northern movement after the breeding season.

=== Feeding ===
The pale-breasted spinetail feeds on a wide variety of arthropods, and also includes small snails in its diet. It usually forages in pairs, gleaning prey from grass, foliage, small branches, and at times the ground. It usually stays below about 2 m (7 ft) of the ground.

=== Breeding ===
The pale-breasted spinetail's breeding season varies geographically but is generally within the local spring and summer. Though it is a member of the ovenbird family, which is named for the clay nests many species make, the pale-breasted spinetail constructs a globe of grass and thorny sticks with a horizontal entrance tube. The tube and inner chamber are lined with soft plant material. The nest is typically placed in bunch grass or in a vine-covered bush, usually within 2 m (7 ft) of the ground and rarely as high as 9 m (30 ft). The clutch size is two to four eggs. The incubation period is 15 to 18 days and fledging occurs about 16 days after hatch. The species is thought to be monogamous, and both members of the pair incubate the clutch and care for nestlings.

=== Vocalization ===
The pale-breasted spinetail sings for long periods. Its song is variously described as "a sharp, scratchy zwee-bit, zweebit", a "very high scratchy wéetjirr wéetjirr", an "incessantly repeated wee-tee", an "unceasing, very high, shrill 'zutsweet zutsweet- -' ", a repeated "wee bidget..wee bidget...", and "a buzzy, nasal 'wéé-byew', 'wáke-up', 'wa-tér' ". A call in Costa Rica is a "sharp 'bip' " that is often repeated and followed by a "long rattling 'churrr' ". In Brazil its call is described as an "extr. high 'tsweét' ".

== Status ==
The IUCN has assessed the pale-breasted spinetail as being of Least Concern. It has an extremely large range and its estimated population of 50 million mature individuals is believed to be stable. No immediate threats have been identified. It is considered fairly common to common in most of its range though local in southeastern Brazil. It is "[t]olerant of moderate anthropogenic disturbance, provided that adequate areas of tall grass remain [and is expanding] its range in areas that have been cleared".
