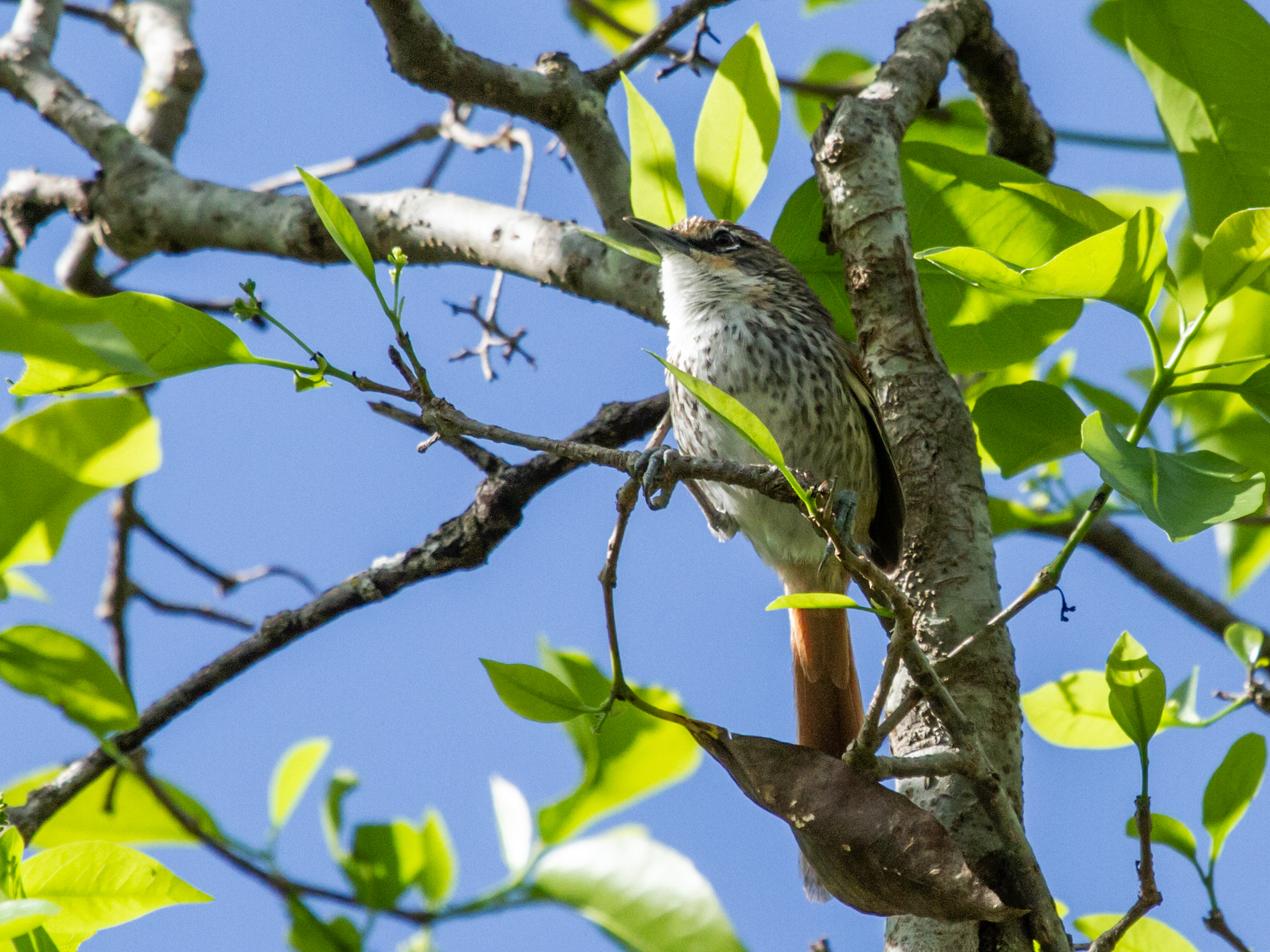

Conservation status
- Least Concern (IUCN 3.1)

Scientific classification
- Kingdom: Animalia
- Phylum: Chordata
- Class: Aves
- Order: Passeriformes
- Family: Furnariidae
- Genus: Synallaxis
- Species: S. chinchipensis

Binomial name
- Synallaxis chinchipensis Chapman, 1925

= Chinchipe spinetail =

Species of bird

The Chinchipe spinetail (Synallaxis chinchipensis) is a species of bird in the family Furnariidae, the ovenbirds. It is endemic to Peru.

== Taxonomy and systematics ==
The Chinchipe spinetail was long considered a subspecies of the necklaced spinetail (Synallaxis stictothorax). Several publications beginning in 2010 described the morphological, vocal, and phylogenetic differences between them. Based on that evidence, the South American Classification Committee of the American Ornithological Society and the International Ornithological Congress elevated it to species rank in January 2021. The Clements taxonomy followed suit in August 2021. The Chinchipe spinetail is monotypic.

== Description ==
The Chinchipe spinetail is 11 to 13 cm (4.3 to 5.1 in) long. It is one of the smallest members of genus Synallaxis. The sexes have the same plumage. Adults have a buffy supercilium on an otherwise blackish face with faint whitish streaks. Their forecrown has black and white streaks. The rest of their crown is dull grayish brown, their back slightly browner, their rump rufescent-brown, and their uppertail coverts bright rufous. The wing has whitish at the bend; the coverts and secondaries are rufous and the primaries dusky. Their tail is bright rufous but for the dark brownish central pair of feathers. Their throat is white, their breast buffy white with black spots, their belly whitish, and their flanks and undertail coverts grayish. Their iris is brown to reddish brown or brownish red, their bill black (sometimes with much gray on the mandible), and their legs and feet blue-gray to dark gray. The juvenile plumage has not been described.

== Distribution and habitat ==
The Chinchipe spinetail is found only in northwestern Peru, in the drainages of Río Marañón and Río Chinchipe in the Department of Cajamarca. It inhabits scrub and the edges of deciduous woods, mostly between 400 and 600 m (1,300 and 2,000 ft) of elevation.

== Behavior ==
=== Movement ===
The Chinchipe spinetail is a year-round resident throughout its range.

=== Feeding ===
The Chinchipe spinetail's principal foods are arthropods and arthropod larvae. It usually feeds within 1 or 2 m (3 or 7 ft) of the ground, gleaning from moss, leaves, and small branches in pairs or mixed-species flocks.

=== Breeding ===
Nothing is known about the Chinchipe spinetail's breeding biology.

=== Vocalization ===
The Chinchipe spinetail's song is a "short rhythmic phrase consisting of a rising trill followed by a loud squeak and a stuttered monotone trill, rendered tr'r'r'r'up-KSEEP'tra'a'a or turree-TYEE-trrree". It also makes a "rattled series of notes...which may go up and down in pace and pitch". Both vocalizations are often given in duet. Pairs sing mostly in the morning and typically from within dense scrub.

== Status ==
The IUCN has assessed the Chinchipe spinetail as being of Least Concern. It has a limited range; its population size is not known but is believed to be stable. No immediate threats have been identified. It appears to be fairly common and to tolerate some habitat degradation.
