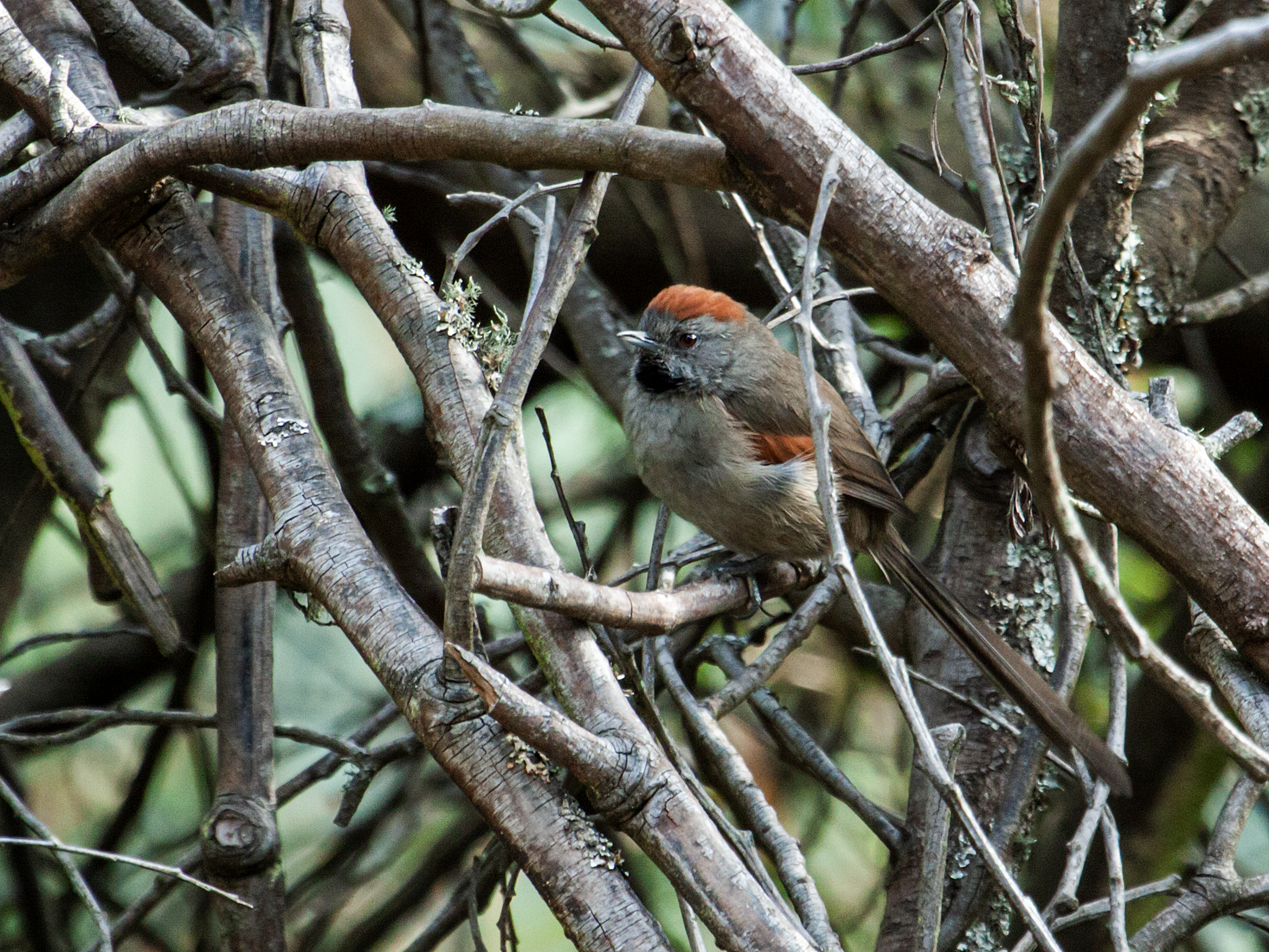

Conservation status
- Least Concern (IUCN 3.1)

Scientific classification
- Kingdom: Animalia
- Phylum: Chordata
- Class: Aves
- Order: Passeriformes
- Family: Furnariidae
- Genus: Synallaxis
- Species: S. subpudica

Binomial name
- Synallaxis subpudica Sclater, PL, 1874

= Silvery-throated spinetail =

Species of bird

The silvery-throated spinetail (Synallaxis subpudica) is a species of bird in the Furnariinae subfamily of the ovenbird family Furnariidae. It is endemic to Colombia.

== Taxonomy and systematics ==
The silvery-throated spinetail is monotypic.

== Description ==
The silvery-throated spinetail is 17 to 19 cm (6.7 to 7.5 in) long. The sexes have the same plumage. Adults have a thin light cinnamon supercilium on an otherwise grayish brown face. Their forecrown is grayish brown, their hindcrown and nape rufous-chestnut, and their back, rump, and uppertail coverts brown. Their wing coverts and base of their flight feathers are chestnut and the rest of the flight feathers are brown. Their tail is a slightly darker brown than the back; it is very long and the feathers lack barbs at their tips, giving a spiny appearance. Their throat is gray with faint darker mottling and a blackish center. Their underparts are dull grayish brown with an olive tinge; it is lighter on the belly. Their iris is dark reddish brown, their maxilla blackish gray, their mandible gray, and their legs and feet gray. Juveniles have a gray crown.

== Distribution and habitat ==
The silvery-throated spinetail is found in Colombia's Eastern Andes from northern Boyacá Department north into Santander Department. It primarily inhabits the edges of montane evergreen forest, both primary and secondary, and second-growth scrublands. It also occurs in the undergrowth at the edge of cloudforest and in forest clearings that are regrowing. In elevation it mostly ranges between 2,100 and 3,200 m (6,900 and 10,500 ft) but is found as low as 1,300 m (4,300 ft).

== Behavior ==
=== Movement ===
The silvery-throated spinetail is a year-round resident throughout its range.

=== Feeding ===
The silvery-throated spinetail's diet has not been studied; it is assumed to feed mostly on arthropods. It usually forages in pairs, gleaning prey from foliage and small branches, typically 1 to 2 m (3 to 7 ft) above the ground but sometimes higher.

=== Breeding ===
The silvery-throated spinetail's nest is a bulky mass of thorny sticks with a horizontal entrance tube; the egg chamber is lined with moss. It is typically placed in a bush about 2 m (7 ft) above the ground. Nothing else is known about its breeding biology.

=== Vocalization ===
The silvery-throated spinetail's song is "a fast, accelerating, descending and fading series of chattering notes...'chí-chi-chi-che-che-che-chu-chu-chu' " and is often sung in duet. Its call is "a sharp 'kik' " and its alarm call "a low trill".

== Status ==
The IUCN has assessed the silvery-throated spinetail as being of Least Concern. It has a limited range and an unknown population size; the latter is believed to be stable. No immediate threats have been identified. It is considered fairly common to common. It "[t]olerates fair degree of anthropogenic habitat disturbance, and probably benefits from fragmentation of forest".
