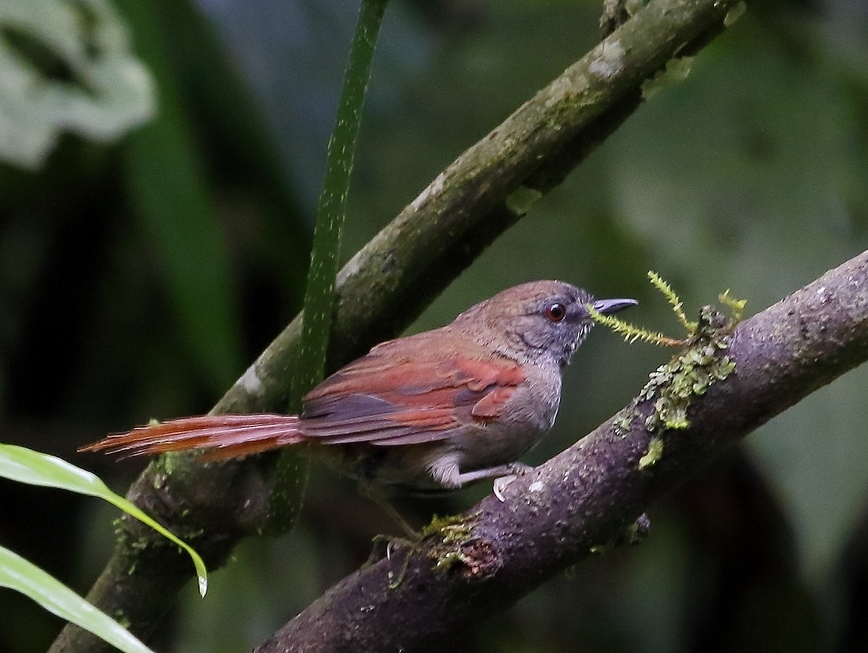

Conservation status
- Least Concern (IUCN 3.1)

Scientific classification
- Kingdom: Animalia
- Phylum: Chordata
- Class: Aves
- Order: Passeriformes
- Family: Furnariidae
- Genus: Synallaxis
- Species: S. cinerascens

Binomial name
- Synallaxis cinerascens Temminck, 1823

= Grey-bellied spinetail =

Species of bird

The grey-bellied spinetail (Synallaxis cinerascens) is a species of bird in the Furnariinae subfamily of the ovenbird family Furnariidae. It is found in Argentina, Brazil, Paraguay, and Uruguay.

== Taxonomy and systematics ==
The grey-bellied spinetail is monotypic. It and the ochre-cheeked spinetail (S. scutata) are sister species.

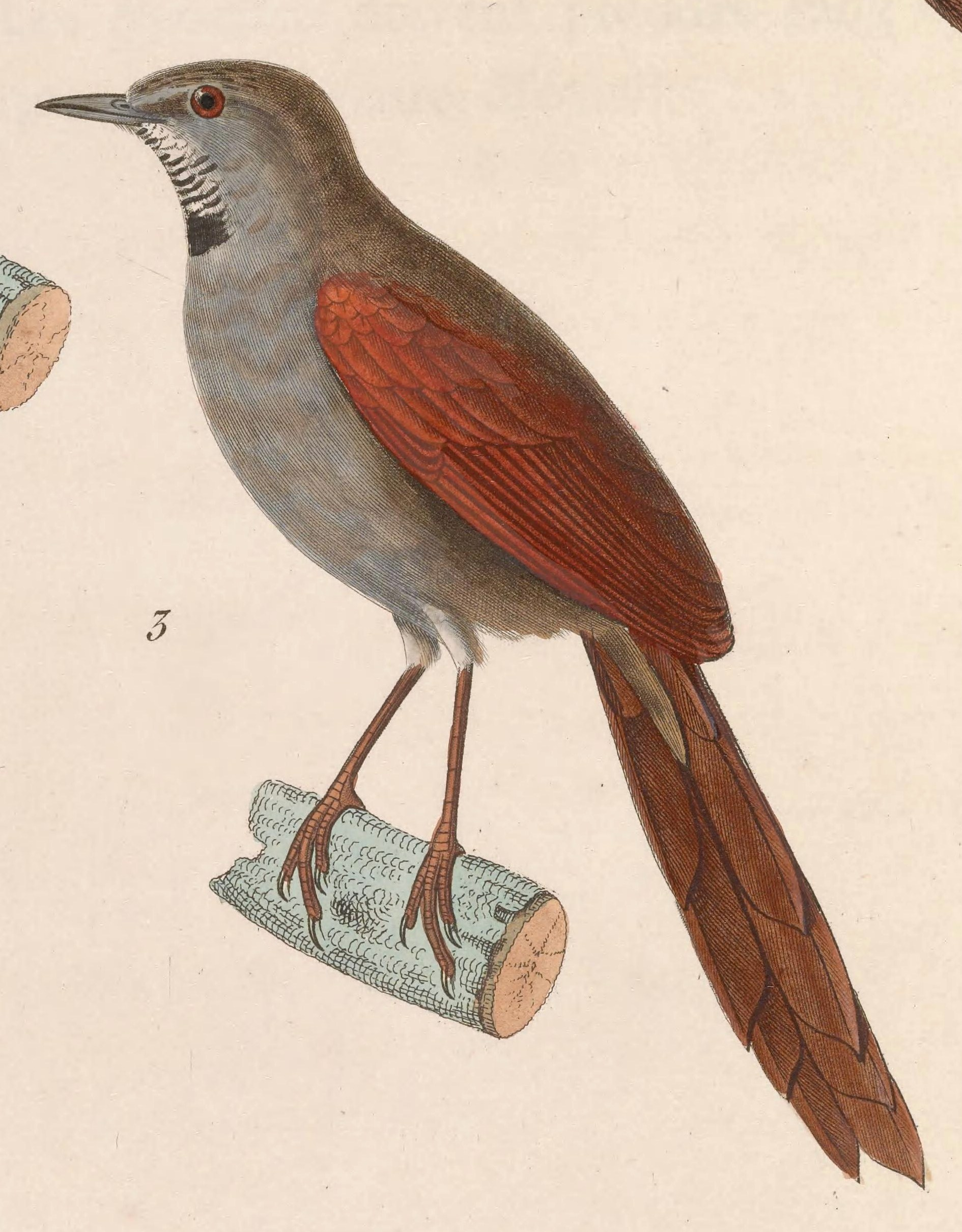
Illustration from Nouveau recueil de planches coloriées d'oiseaux, 1838

== Description ==
The grey-bellied spinetail is 13.5 to 15 cm (5.3 to 5.9 in) long and weighs 10 to 14 g (0.35 to 0.49 oz). The sexes have the same plumage. Adults have blackish lores and a faint gray line behind the eye on an otherwise gray-brown face. Their forehead is dark grayish brown, their crown dark brownish olive, and their back, rump, and uppertail coverts are richer brown. Their wings are mostly rich reddish chestnut. Their tail is dark chestnut; the tips of the feathers have no barbs giving a spiny appearance. Their chin is whitish, their upper throat mottled black and pale gray, and their lower throat black. Their underparts are mostly brownish gray with a paler and grayer center to the belly and browner flanks and undertail coverts. Their iris is reddish brown, their bill black (sometimes with a gray base to the mandible), and their legs and feet greenish gray. Juveniles have a less distinct throat patch than adults and slightly paler underparts with some mottling.

== Distribution and habitat ==
The grey-bellied spinetail is found from the Brazilian states of Goiás, Minas Gerais, and Espírito Santo south through eastern Paraguay and northeastern Argentina's Misiones and Corrientes provinces into northern Uruguay. It inhabits the interior of dense lowland and montane evergreen forest and mature secondary forest; it shuns the forest edges. In elevation it is found from near sea level to 1,150 m (3,800 ft).

== Behavior ==
=== Movement ===
The grey-bellied spinetail is a year-round resident throughout its range.

=== Feeding ===
The grey-bellied spinetail feeds on arthropods. It usually forages in pairs, on the ground and in the understorey up to about 2 m (7 ft) above the ground. It gleans its prey from leaf litter and the low vegetation.

=== Breeding ===
The grey-bellied spinetail is thought to breed during the austral spring and summer. It is thought to be monogamous. Its nest is a large mass woven of sticks with a tubular entrance that slopes upward to the nest chamber; the chamber is floored with soft leaves. It is placed on the ground in a shallow bowl that the bird scrapes. The clutch size is three eggs. The incubation period, time to fledging, and details of parental care are not known.

=== Vocalization ===
The grey-bellied spinetail's song is a "very high, piercing 'weeet-sweet' " whose first note is higher than the second.

== Status ==
The IUCN has assessed the grey-bellied spinetail as being of Least Concern. It has a large range and an unknown population size that is believed to be decreasing. No immediate threats have been identified. It is considered uncommon to fairly common and occurs in several protected areas. However, "[e]xtensive deforestation within this species' relatively small range has dramatically reduced its habitat. Its dependence on forest makes it more vulnerable to deforestation than are many other members of genus".
