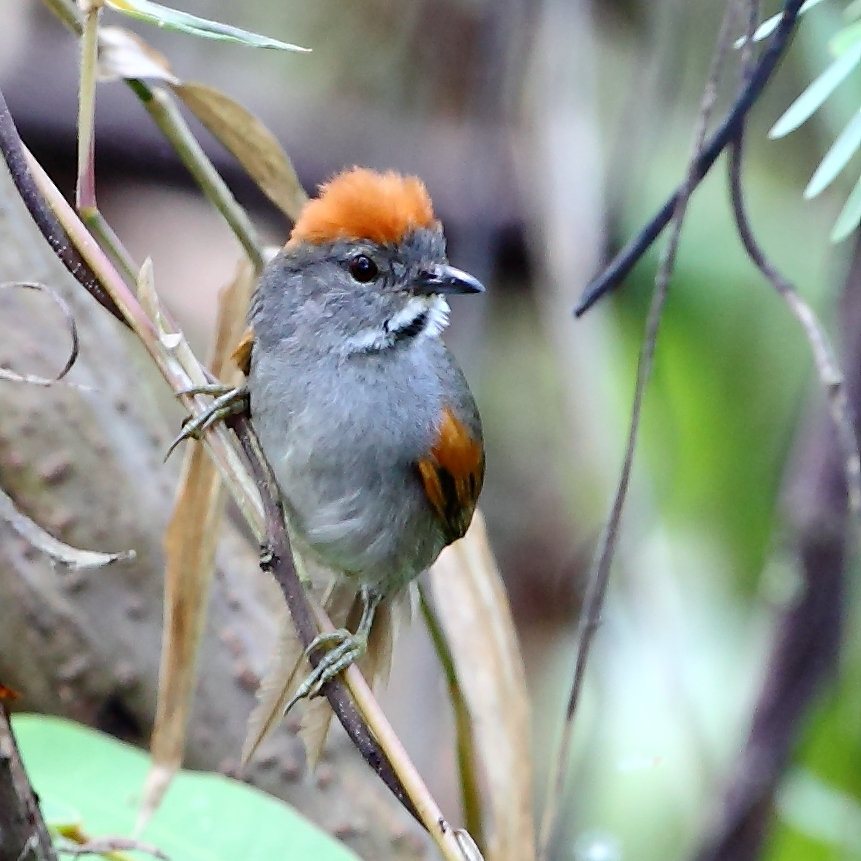
- At Iranduba, Amazonas state, Brazil Song of dark-breasted spinetail

Conservation status
- Least Concern (IUCN 3.1)

Scientific classification
- Kingdom: Animalia
- Phylum: Chordata
- Class: Aves
- Order: Passeriformes
- Family: Furnariidae
- Genus: Synallaxis
- Species: S. albigularis

Binomial name
- Synallaxis albigularis Sclater, PL, 1858

= Dark-breasted spinetail =

Species of bird

The dark-breasted spinetail (Synallaxis albigularis) is a species of bird in the Furnariinae subfamily of the ovenbird family Furnariidae. It is found in Bolivia, Brazil, Colombia, Ecuador, and Peru.

== Taxonomy and systematics ==
The dark-breasted spinetail was previously considered to be conspecific with the pale-breasted spinetail (S. albescens) and some authors treat them as sister species. The dark-breasted spinetail has two subspecies, the nominate S. a. albigularis (Sclater, PL, 1858) and S. a. rodolphei (Bond, J, 1956). A subpopulation within the nominate may be a third subspecies.

== Description ==
The dark-breasted spinetail is 15 to 16 cm (5.9 to 6.3 in) long and weighs 14 to 18 g (0.49 to 0.63 oz). The sexes have the same plumage. Adults of the nominate subspecies have a brownish gray face and forecrown. Their hindcrown and nape are dark rufous, and their back, rump and uppertail coverts olive-brown. Their wing coverts are dark rufous with paler edges and their flight feathers dark brownish. Their tail is dull brown; it is graduated and the feathers have pointed tips. Their throat is grayish white with sooty flecks; the lower throat feathers are blackish with pale gray edges. Their breast and sides are brownish gray, their belly paler gray to almost white in the center, and their flanks and undertail coverts browner than the belly. Their iris is reddish brown to brown or pale brown, their maxilla black to dark gray, their mandible grayish to blue-gray, and their legs and feet greenish gray to greenish yellow. Juveniles have a brownish gray crown, mostly dark ochraceous underparts, and a paler and less distinct throat patch than adults. Subspecies S. a. rodolphei has a slightly darker back and significantly darker underparts than the nominate except for the highly contrasting whitish center of the belly. A subpopulation of the nominate in northern Peru is also darker than most of that subspecies and may represent a different subspecies.

== Distribution and habitat ==
Subspecies S. a. rodolphei of the dark-breasted spinetail is found from Meta Department in south-central Colombia south into northeastern Ecuador as far as Napo Province. The nominate subspecies is found from Napo in Ecuador and extreme southern Amazonas Department in southeastern Colombia south through eastern Ecuador and Peru into western Bolivia and east in Brazil along the Amazon River to the Rio Negro. The species inhabits tall grass, scrub, and Gynerium cane stands on river islands, "mainland" scrub, shrubby grassy clearings and pastures, and plantations. In elevation it mostly occurs between sea level and 1,500 m (4,900 ft) but is found locally as high as 2,100 m (6,900 ft).

== Behavior ==
=== Movement ===
The dark-breasted spinetail is a year-round resident throughout its range.

=== Feeding ===
The dark-breasted spinetail feeds on arthropods. It usually forages in pairs, gleaning prey from foliage and small branches and staying about 1 to 2 m (3 to 7 ft) above the ground but also feeding on the ground.

=== Breeding ===
The dark-breasted spinetail's breeding season includes June and July in Colombia but has not been defined elsewhere. It is thought to be monogamous. Its nest is a mass of sticks with an entrance tube on the side, typically placed in dense vegetation about 1 to 2 m (3 to 7 ft) above the ground. Nothing else is known about its breeding biology.

=== Vocalization ===
The dark-breasted spinetail's song is "a hurried 'chéép, du-du-du' or 'whít, di-di-di' " that is often repeated at length. Other vocalizations include a "short chatter" and an "accelerating whinny, 'neeh-neeh-neeh-neeh-neh-neh-neh' ".

== Status ==
The IUCN has assessed the dark-breasted spinetail as being of Least Concern. It has a large range; its population size is not known but is believed to be increasing. No immediate threats have been identified. It is considered common and occurs in several protected areas. It is "[p]resent in many areas of high anthropogenic disturbance [and] expanding its range into deforested areas".
