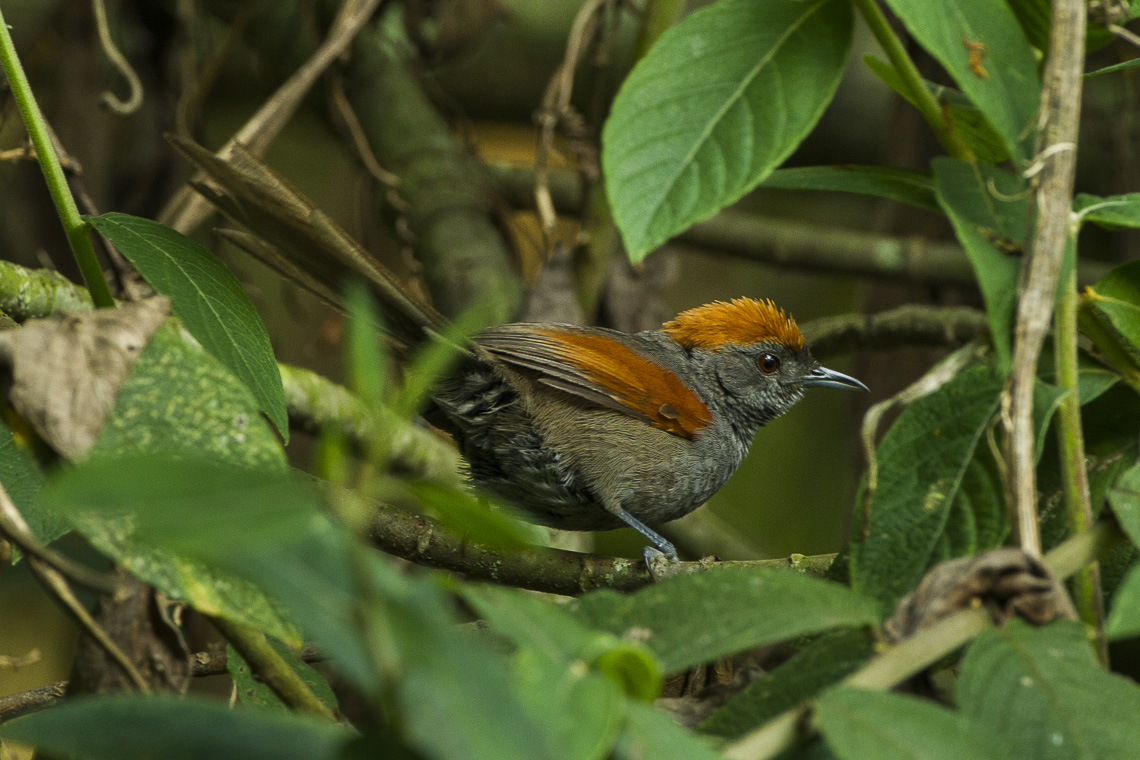

Conservation status
- Least Concern (IUCN 3.1)

Scientific classification
- Kingdom: Animalia
- Phylum: Chordata
- Class: Aves
- Order: Passeriformes
- Family: Furnariidae
- Genus: Synallaxis
- Species: S. brachyura

Binomial name
- Synallaxis brachyura Lafresnaye, 1843

= Slaty spinetail =

Species of bird

The slaty spinetail or slaty castlebuilder, (Synallaxis brachyura), is a passerine bird in the Furnariinae subfamily of the ovenbird family Furnariidae. It is found from Honduras south to Peru.

== Taxonomy and systematics ==
The slaty spinetail has four subspecies:

- S. b. nigrifumosa Lawrence, 1865
- S. b. griseonucha Chapman, 1923
- S. b. brachyura Lafresnaye, 1843
- S. b. caucae Chapman, 1914

== Description ==
The slaty spinetail is 14 to 16 cm (5.5 to 6.3 in) long and weighs 16 to 21 g (0.56 to 0.74 oz). The sexes have the same plumage. Adults of the nominate subspecies S. b. brachyura have a grayish supercilium on an otherwise darker gray face. Their crown and nape are deep rufous-chestnut, their back is dark sooty brown to slate-brown, and their rump and uppertail coverts are slightly browner than the back. Their wing coverts and base of their flight feathers are deep rufous-chestnut and the rest of the flight feathers are dark brown. Their tail is the same brown as the rump and uppertail coverts; it is long and the feathers lack barbs at their tips, giving a spiny appearance. Their throat is blackish, their breast and sides dark sooty brown, their belly a paler and grayer brown, and their flanks and undertail coverts browner than the belly. Their iris is reddish brown to orange-brown, their maxilla black to gray, their mandible gray to blue-gray, and their legs and feet olive-gray, gray, or blue-gray. Juveniles have a gray crown and nape and compared to adults have paler upperparts, duller wing coverts, and more olivaceous underparts.

Subspecies S. b. nigrifumosa has a darker brown back, darker rufous crown and wings, and darker gray underparts than the nominate. S. b. griseonucha is darker than the nominate but paler than nigrifumosa. S. b. caucae has a paler crown, a grayer back, and paler grayish olive rump and uppertail coverts than the nominate.

== Distribution and habitat ==
The subspecies of the slaty spinetail are found thus:

- S. b. nigrifumosa: the Caribbean slope from Honduras through Nicaragua and Costa Rica into Panama
- S. b. griseonucha: the Pacific slope from central Costa Rica south through western Panama, Colombia, and Ecuador into extreme northwestern Peru's Department of Tumbes
- S. b. brachyura: northern Colombia from Antioquia Department east to the valley of the Magdalena River
- S. b. caucae: the Cauca River valley in central Colombia

The slaty spinetail inhabits a variety of landscapes, most of which have dense undergrowth. These include second-growth scrublands, riparian thickets, overgrown clearings, and the edges of montane evergreen and tropical evergreen forest. It also occurs locally in thorn scrub, the edges of swamps, and gardens. In elevation it is mostly found below 1,400 m (4,600 ft); it occurs below 1,200 m (3,900 ft) in Costa Rica and as high as 2,000 m (6,600 ft) in Colombia.

== Behavior ==
=== Movement ===
The slaty spinetail is a year-round resident throughout its range.

=== Feeding ===
The slaty spinetail feeds mostly on arthropods but also includes seeds in its diet. It usually forages in pairs, gleaning its prey from live and dead leaves and small branches in low vegetation and from leaf litter on the ground.

=== Breeding ===
The slaty spinetail's breeding season has not been fully defined but in Costa Rica eggs have been found in January, February, and between April and October. Though it is a member of the "ovenbird" family, so named because many species build elaborate clay nests, this species' nest is a bulky mass of thorny sticks with a horizontal entrance tube. The egg chamber is lined with soft leaves and spider web, often with snake and lizard skins included. It typically is constructed in a dense bush or vine-covered tree between about 0.5 and 5 m (2 and 16 ft) above the ground. The clutch size is two to three eggs. The incubation period is 18 to 19 days and fledging occurs about 17 days after hatch. Both parents incubate the clutch and provision the nestlings.

=== Vocalization ===
The slaty spinetail's song has been described as "ch-ch-ch-churrr-r-r-r", "je-ch-ch-chrrrrr", "chut-chut-chrrrrrrrrrrr", and a wren-like "hard trill". While foraging it gives a "chk" call; another call is "chee-ah".

== Status ==
The IUCN has assessed the slaty spinetail as being of Least Concern. It has a very large range and an estimated population of at least 500,000 mature individuals that is believed to be stable. No immediate threats have been identified. It is considered fairly common to common and occurs in several protected areas. It is "[t]olerant of moderate anthropogenic habitat disturbance, and presumably benefits from fragmentation of forest".
