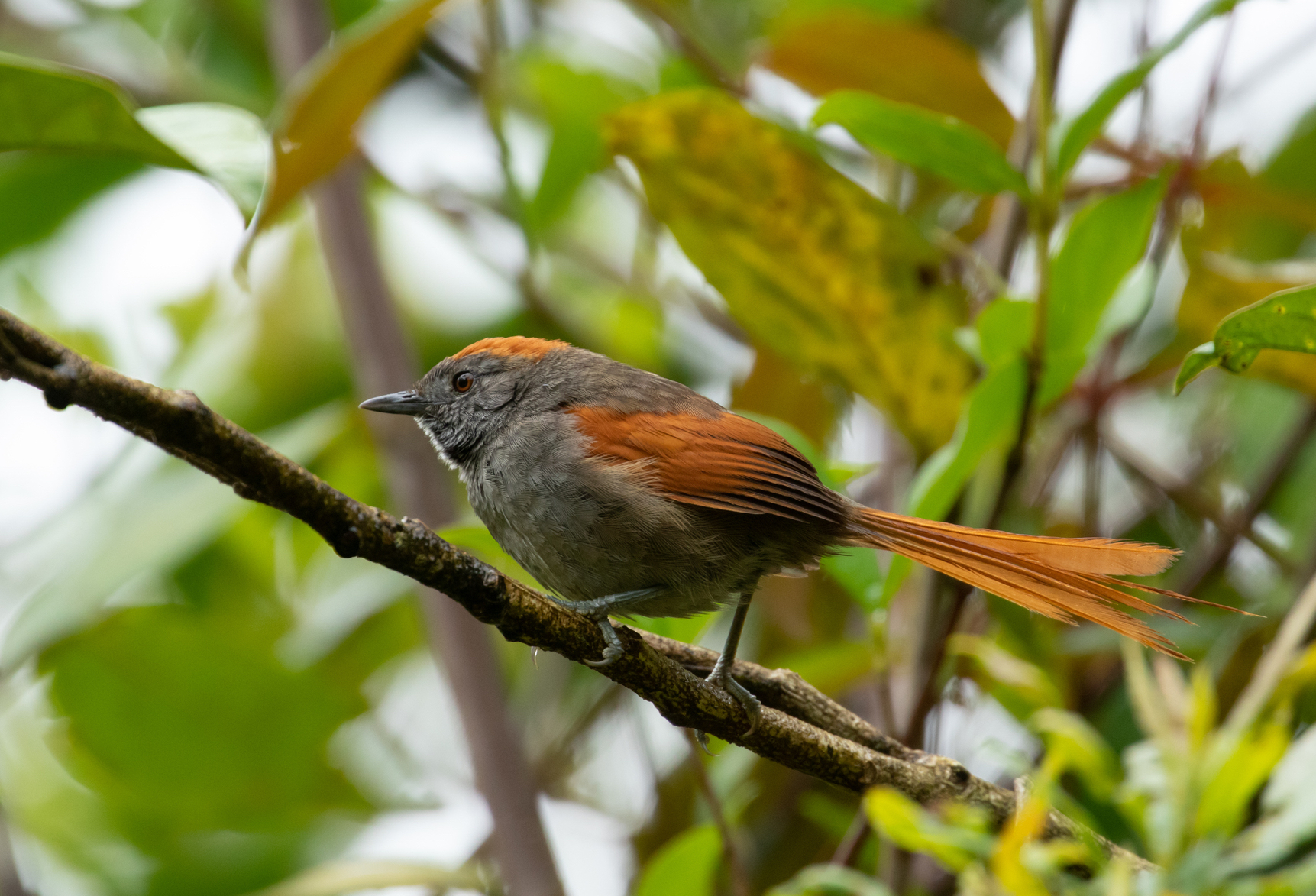
- S. azarae, Pasco, Peru Song of Azara's spinetail

Conservation status
- Least Concern (IUCN 3.1)

Scientific classification
- Kingdom: Animalia
- Phylum: Chordata
- Class: Aves
- Order: Passeriformes
- Family: Furnariidae
- Genus: Synallaxis
- Species: S. azarae

Binomial name
- Synallaxis azarae D'Orbigny, 1835

Synonyms
- Synallaxis superciliosa; Synallaxis elegantior

= Azara's spinetail =

Species of bird

Azara's spinetail (Synallaxis azarae) is a species of bird in the Furnariinae subfamily of the ovenbird family Furnariidae. It is found in Argentina, Bolivia, Colombia, Ecuador, Peru, and Venezuela.

== Taxonomy and systematics ==
Azara's spinetail has these nine subspecies:

- S. a. elegantior Sclater, PL, 1862
- S. a. media Chapman, 1914
- S. a. ochracea Zimmer, JT, 1936
- S. a. fruticicola Taczanowski, 1880
- S. a. infumata Zimmer, JT, 1925
- S. a. urubambae Zimmer, JT, 1935
- S. a. azarae D'Orbigny, 1835
- S. a. samaipatae Bond, J & Meyer de Schauensee, 1941
- S. a. superciliosa Cabanis, 1883

Subspecies S. a. samaipatae and S. a. superciliosa were together once treated as a separate species, the "buff-browed spinetail". Similarly, S. a. elegantior, S. a. media, S. a. ochracea, and S. a. fruticicola were treated as one species.

Azara's spinetail is named after Spanish naturalist Félix de Azara.

== Description ==
Azara's spinetail is 15 to 18 cm (5.9 to 7.1 in) long and weighs 12 to 18 g (0.42 to 0.63 oz). The sexes have the same plumage. Adults of the nominate subspecies S. a. azarae have a brownish gray face with a slightly paler supercilium. Their forehead and forecrown are dark grayish brown, their hindcrown and nape dark rufous, and their back, rump and uppertail coverts rich olive-brown. Their wings are mostly rufous-chestnut with dark brownish tips on their flight feathers. Their tail is dull chestnut-brown; the tail is graduated and the feathers have somewhat pointed tips. Their chin and edges of their throat are pale grayish with darker tips on the feathers; the center of their throat is sooty black with pale edges on the feathers. Their breast is dark brownish gray, their belly paler and grayer with faint mottling, and their flanks and undertail coverts browner than the breast and belly. Their iris is reddish brown to chestnut, their maxilla black to dark gray, their mandible gray or blue-gray (sometimes with a blackish base or tip), and their legs and feet olive-gray to grayish green. Juveniles have a brown crown and back, an indistinct throat patch, and a pale brown to ochraeceous wash on their underparts.

The other subspecies of Azara's spinetail differ from the nominate and each other thus:

- S. a. elegantior: paler than the nominate, with a white spot on the lores, a fainter supercilium, and more fulvous flanks
- S. a. media: paler than elegantior, with an even fainter supercilium and smaller loral spot, grayer chest, and paler and more olivaceous flanks
- S. a. ochracea: paler than the nominate (especially the crown and wing coverts), with a more buffy brown back, very pale underparts, and an ochraceous tinge to the flanks
- S. a. fruticicola: lighter than the nominate but darker than ochrachea
- S. a. infumata: similar to the nominate, with more gray on the forehead and brighter rufous wing coverts
- S. a. urubambae: similar to the nominate, but with a darker tail tinged olivaceous gray, brighter wing coverts, and dull rufous edges on the flight feathers.
- S. a. samaipatae: paler than the nominate, with faint rufous edges on the forehead feathers, a buffish supercilium, and medium gray face and breast
- S. a. superciliosa: paler than the nominate, with a more prominent and buff supercilium, and light brown underparts with a whitish belly

== Distribution and habitat ==
The subspecies of Azara's spinetail are found thus:

- S. a. elegantior: Colombia's Eastern Andes and western Venezuela
- S. a. media: Colombia's Central and Western Andes and south in Ecuador's Andes to Cotopaxi Province on the western slope and Zamora-Chinchipe Province on the eastern
- S. a. ochracea: Andes of southwestern Ecuador from Guayas and Chimborazo provinces south into northwestern Peru as far as the Department of Lambayeque
- S. a. fruticicola northern Peru, in the valley of the Marañón River between the departments of Cajamarca and La Libertad
- S. a. infumata: Andes of northern and central Peru between the departments of Amazonas and Junín
- S. a. urubambae: Department of Cuzco in southern Peru
- S. a. azarae: Andes from the Department of Puno in southeastern Peru into central Bolivia as far as northwestern Santa Cruz Department
- S. a. samaipatae: Andes of southern Bolivia from Santa Cruz to Tarija Department
- S. a. superciliosa: Andes of northwestern Argentina between the provinces of Jujuy and Catamarca

Azara's spinetail inhabits a variety of semi-open landscapes both humid and drier, including the edges of montane evergreen forest, secondary forest, the edges of cloudforest and elfin forest, bushy pastures and roadsides, riparian thickets, and in Argentina semi-deciduous and deciduous woodlands. It tends to remain in dense vegetation near the ground. In most of its range it occurs between elevations of 1,500 and 3,500 m (4,900 and 11,500 ft). In Bolivia and Argentina it occurs lower, mostly between 600 and 1,600 m (2,000 and 5,200 ft). In Ecuador it occurs locally down to 900 m (3,000 ft) or lower and in Colombia down to 1,200 m (3,900 ft).

== Behavior ==
=== Movement ===
Azara's spinetail is a year-round resident throughout its range.

=== Feeding ===
Azara's spinetail feeds on arthropods; its diet also includes small seeds. It usually forages in pairs and sometimes joins mixed-species feeding flocks. It gleans prey from foliage, small branches, and occasionally dead leaves. It usually stays below about 2 m (7 ft) of the ground but has been recorded feeding as high as 6 m (20 ft).

=== Breeding ===
Azara's spinetail has a wide breeding season including both wet and dry months; in some areas it may breed year round. Eggs have been noted between February and April in Colombia and Ecuador, and fledglings between May and September from Colombia to Peru. The species is monogamous. Its nest is a longish mass of sticks with a horizontal or upward entrance tube; the inner chamber is lined with soft plant material and sometimes includes shed snake skin. It is placed low to the ground in dense vegetation. The clutch size is two to four eggs. The incubation period, time to fledging, and details of parental care are not known.

=== Vocalization ===
Azara's spinetail is quite vocal, repeating for minutes at a time a sharp "ket-kwééék", "pip-squeak", or "ka-kweeék". It also makes "scratchy, nasal 'prrt' notes", " 'kweek-kweek' notes", and a "low short 'chur' or 'trrt' ".

== Status ==
The IUCN has assessed Azara's spinetail as being of Least Concern. It has a very large range, and though its population size is not known it is believed to be stable. No immediate threats have been identified. It is considered fairly common to common in most of its range and occurs in many protected areas. It "[t]olerates moderate anthropogenic disturbance [and] presumably benefits from forest fragmentation".
