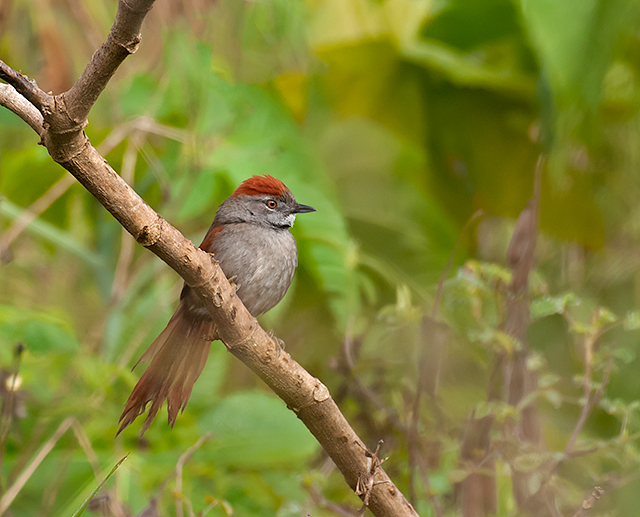
- At Piraju, São Paulo State, Brazil

Conservation status
- Least Concern (IUCN 3.1)

Scientific classification
- Kingdom: Animalia
- Phylum: Chordata
- Class: Aves
- Order: Passeriformes
- Family: Furnariidae
- Genus: Synallaxis
- Species: S. frontalis

Binomial name
- Synallaxis frontalis Pelzeln, 1859

= Sooty-fronted spinetail =

Species of bird

The sooty-fronted spinetail (Synallaxis frontalis) is a species of bird in the Furnariinae subfamily of the ovenbird family Furnariidae. It is found in Argentina, Bolivia, Brazil, Paraguay, and Uruguay.

== Taxonomy and systematics ==
The sooty-fronted spinetail's taxonomy is unsettled. The International Ornithological Committee and BirdLife International's Handbook of the Birds of the World treat it as monotypic. The Clements taxonomy recognizes two subspecies, the nominate S. f. frontalis (Pelzeln, 1859) and S. f. fuscipennis" (Berlepsch, 1907). A subpopulation in Bolivia's Cochabamba Department might be separable as a subspecies.

This article follows the no-subspecies model.

== Description ==
The sooty-fronted spinetail is 14 to 16 cm (5.5 to 6.3 in) long and weighs 11 to 17 g (0.39 to 0.60 oz). The sexes have the same plumage. Adults have a thin brownish line through the eye on an otherwise brownish gray face. Their forecrown ("front") is dark gray-brown, their hindcrown and nape dark rufous, and their back, rump and uppertail coverts brown with a rufescent tinge. Their wing coverts are dark rufous and their flight feathers tawny-rufous with dusky tips. Their tail is dark rufous with some darker inner webs on the innermost pair of feathers; the tail is graduated and the feathers have slightly pointed tips. Their chin is whitish and their throat grayer; the lower throat feathers has a blackish crescent with pale speckles. Their breast is grayish brown, their belly paler than the breast, and their flanks and undertail coverts browner than the breast and belly. Their iris color is highly variable, their maxilla blackish to dark gray, their mandible gray to pale gray (sometimes with a blackish tip), and their legs and feet olive-gray to greenish gray. Juveniles have a brownish gray crown and an ochraecous wash on their underparts. There is clinal variation in adults, with brighter plumage in the northeast becoming duller in the southwest.

== Distribution and habitat ==
The sooty-fronted spinetail is found from northeastern Brazil (Maranhão to Rio Grande do Norte) southwest in a wide swath through Brazil, eastern Bolivia, most of Paraguay, essentially all of Uruguay, and into Argentina to northern Buenos Aires Province. It inhabits a variety of semi-open landscapes such as gallery forest, the edges of scrubby or deciduous forest, thorn-scrub, woodlands, and bushy savanna.

== Behavior ==
=== Movement ===
The sooty-fronted spinetail is a year-round resident in most of its range, though the farthest southern sub-population might make some northern movement after the breeding season.

=== Feeding ===
The sooty-fronted spinetail's diet is not known in detail but includes beetles. It usually forages in pairs, apparently gleaning prey from foliage and small branches and sometimes the ground. It usually stays below about 2 m (7 ft) of the ground.

=== Breeding ===
The sooty-fronted spinetail breeds in the austral spring and summer. It is thought to be monogamous. Its nest is a globe of thorny twigs with an entrance tube at the side and an inner chamber lined with dead leaves, moss, feathers, and other soft materials. It is usually place in a thorny bush within about 2.5 m (8 ft) of the ground but sometimes as high as 4 m (13 ft). The clutch size is three to four eggs. The incubation period is 15 to 16 days; the time to fledging and details of parental care are not known.

=== Vocalization ===
What appears to be the sooty-fronted spinetail's song is variously described as " 'ka-kwee-éék', 'ka-kweek', 'pi-whéé', or 'ja-coo-éé' ", a "very high 2-noted 'du-Twee' ", and "a slow, deliberate teeoopooee". This vocalization is often given for long periods. It also makes a " 'sew-kli' or 'chi-cli', and [a] ated nasal 'hoint'or 'hoít' ".

== Status ==
The IUCN has assessed the sooty-fronted spinetail as being of Least Concern. It has a very large range; its population size is not known but is believed to be increasing. No immediate threats have been identified. It is considered common to fairly It is considered common to fairly common and occurs in several protected areas. It has "extended its range into deforested areas".
