= Pale mountain pigeon =

Conservation status
- Least Concern (IUCN 3.1)

Scientific classification
- Kingdom: Animalia
- Phylum: Chordata
- Class: Aves
- Order: Columbiformes
- Family: Columbidae
- Genus: Gymnophaps
- Species: G. solomonensis

Binomial name
- Gymnophaps solomonensis Mayr, 1931
- Range of the pale mountain pigeon

Species of bird in the Solomon Islands

The pale mountain pigeon (Gymnophaps solomonensis) is a species of bird in the pigeon family Columbidae. It is endemic to the Solomon Islands archipelago, where it inhabits old-growth and secondary montane forest. It is a medium-size pigeon with an average length of 38 cm (15 in) and a weight of 310–385 g (10.9–13.6 oz). The head and neck are whitish-grey, the belly and lower breast are buffy-pink, and the vent and undertail coverts are pale grey. The upperparts are smoky-grey with darker fringes on the mantle and wing coverts. Both sexes look similar, but there can be large variation in individual appearance.

The pale mountain pigeon feeds on fruit and forages in large flocks. Breeding occurs from July to September in Bougainville and it prefers stunted moss forest containing Eugenia and Syzygium trees during the breeding season. It nests in shallow depressions or scrapes in the forest floor, and lays single white eggs. It is listed as being of least concern by the International Union for Conservation of Nature (IUCN) on the IUCN Red List due to its stable population and a sufficiently large range.

== Taxonomy and systematics ==
The pale mountain pigeon was described as Gymnophaps solomonensis by the German-American biologist Ernst Mayr in 1931 on the basis of specimens from Malaita. The generic name Gymnophaps is derived from the Ancient Greek words γυμνος (gumnos), meaning bare, and φαψ (phaps), meaning pigeon. The specific name solomonensis refers to the Solomon Islands, which is the type locality of this species. Pale mountain pigeon is the official common name designated by the International Ornithologists' Union (IOC). Other common names for the species include pale mountain-pigeon, Solomon mountain pigeon, Solomon mountain-pigeon, and Solomons mountain pigeon.

The pale mountain pigeon is one of four species in the mountain pigeon genus Gymnophaps, which is found in Melanesia and the Maluku Islands. It forms a superspecies with the other species in its genus. Within its family, the genus Gymnophaps is sister to Lopholaimus, and these two together form a clade sister to Hemiphaga. The pale mountain pigeon has no subspecies.

== Description ==
The pale mountain pigeon is a medium-sized pigeon with a slender build and a long tail and wings, with an average length of 38 cm (15 in) and a weight of 310–385 g (10.9–13.6 oz). Both sexes look similar. The upperparts are smoky-grey with darker fringes on the mantle and wing coverts (flight feathers). The head and neck are whitish-grey, being slightly lighter on the throat and upper belly, and the lower breast and belly are darker, being buffy-pink with an occasional wine tinge. The vent and undertail coverts are pale grey. There can be large variation in individual appearance, with the underparts varying from pale grey to having a distinct wine-colored tinge and the upperparts varying from glossy greenish-black to dull greyish-black. The bill is yellow at the base and yellow to pale brown at the tip, with a pink tinge at the edge of the mandibles and on the nostrils. The iris is yellow to orange with an orange to red outer ring; the orbital skin is red to purple. Its feet are pinkish-grey to maroon-grey. Juveniles have cinnamon crowns, lack the wine tinge on the underparts, have fine blackish speckling on their feathers, and have blue-grey irises.

It may be confused with the crested cuckoo-dove, but the latter species is more solitary, has a long pointed crest, a relatively longer tail, rounder wings, and lacks scaly upperparts and wine-tinged underparts. The crested cuckoo-dove also has a more robust bill.

=== Vocalisations ===
The species is usually silent, but occasionally makes a nasal, wheezy vrrhu or a quiet vruu. It may also make a slightly vibrating double low-pitched hoot.

== Distribution and habitat ==
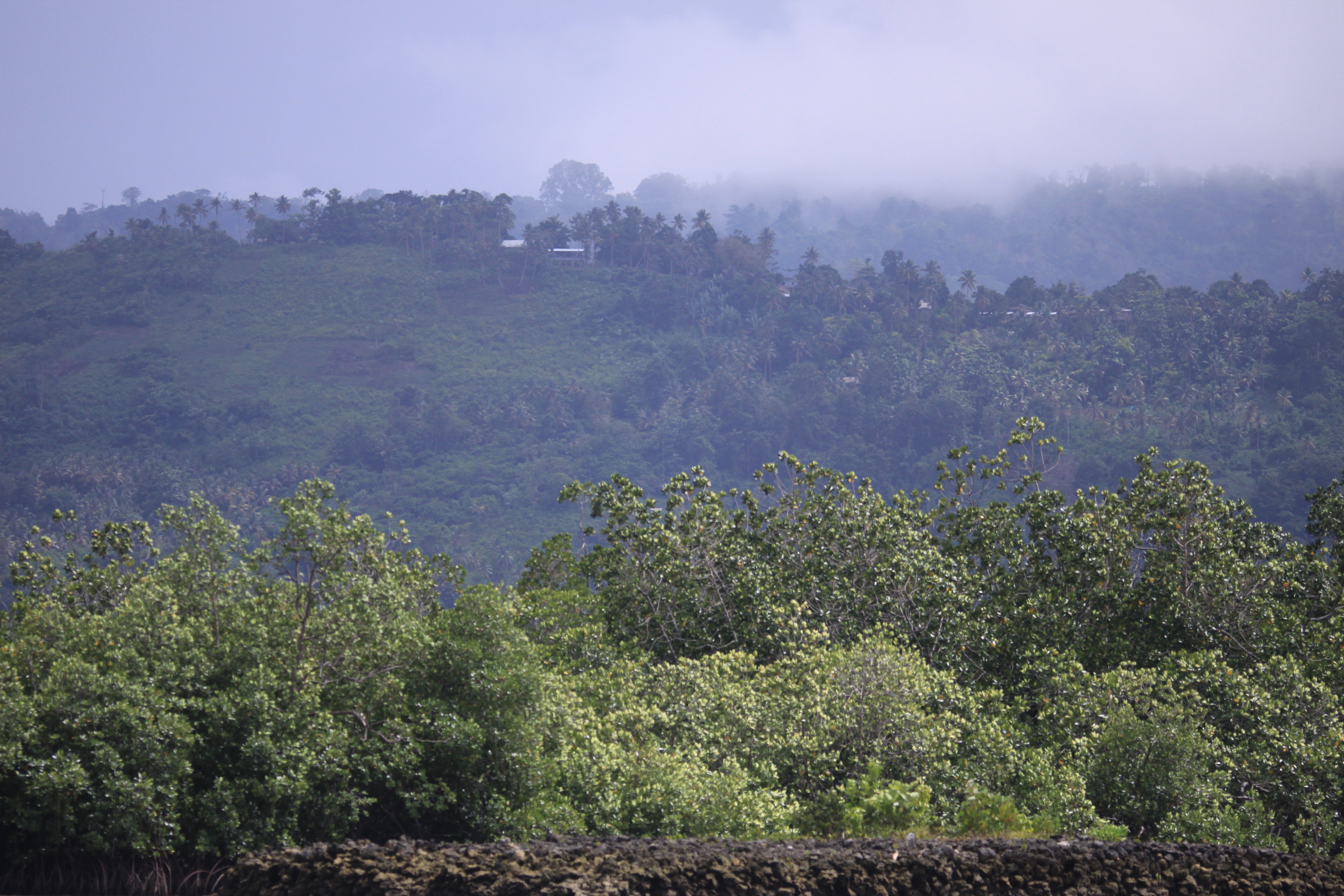
Forest on Malaita

The pale mountain pigeon is endemic to the Solomon Islands archipelago, where it is found on Malaita, Kolombangara, Vangunu, Guadalcanal, and Bougainville. It inhabits montane forest and prefers old-growth, but is also found in secondary forest. It mainly occurs from 750–1,950 m (2,460–6,400 ft), but has been recorded at elevations of 100–940 m (330–3,080 ft) on Kolombangara. Foraging birds occur at elevations down to sea level. It occasionally flies over cultivated areas.

It does not migrate, but moves locally, descending to lower elevations daily to forage.

== Behaviour and ecology ==
The pale mountain pigeon is highly social and is usually seen in flocks of up to 20 birds, although flocks in fruiting trees may have as many as 100 individuals. Like other Gymnophaps species, pale mountain pigeons usually roost high in mountains, and swoop down in the morning to feed in the lowlands and foothills in small flocks. While doing so, they make a distinctive whooshing sound.

=== Diet ===
The pale mountain pigeon is frugivorous and has been observed feeding on fruits with small seeds. It forages in large flocks and usually feeds in the canopy, but also occasionally in the understorey. If disturbed while feeding, the species will fly out of the tree explosively.

=== Breeding ===
Pigeons in breeding condition have been observed from July to September on Bougainville. It has been observed breeding in stunted moss forest containing Eugenia and Syzygium trees. The species' nests are shallow depressions or scrapes in the forest floor, with little to no extra material being added. Clutches contain single white eggs similar to those of the Seram mountain pigeon.

== Status ==
The pale mountain pigeon is listed as being of least concern by the International Union for Conservation of Nature (IUCN) on the IUCN Red List due to its stable population and a sufficiently large range. It is moderately common, and is especially common on Kolombangara, where it can be found roosting by the hundreds in forests near the rim of craters.
