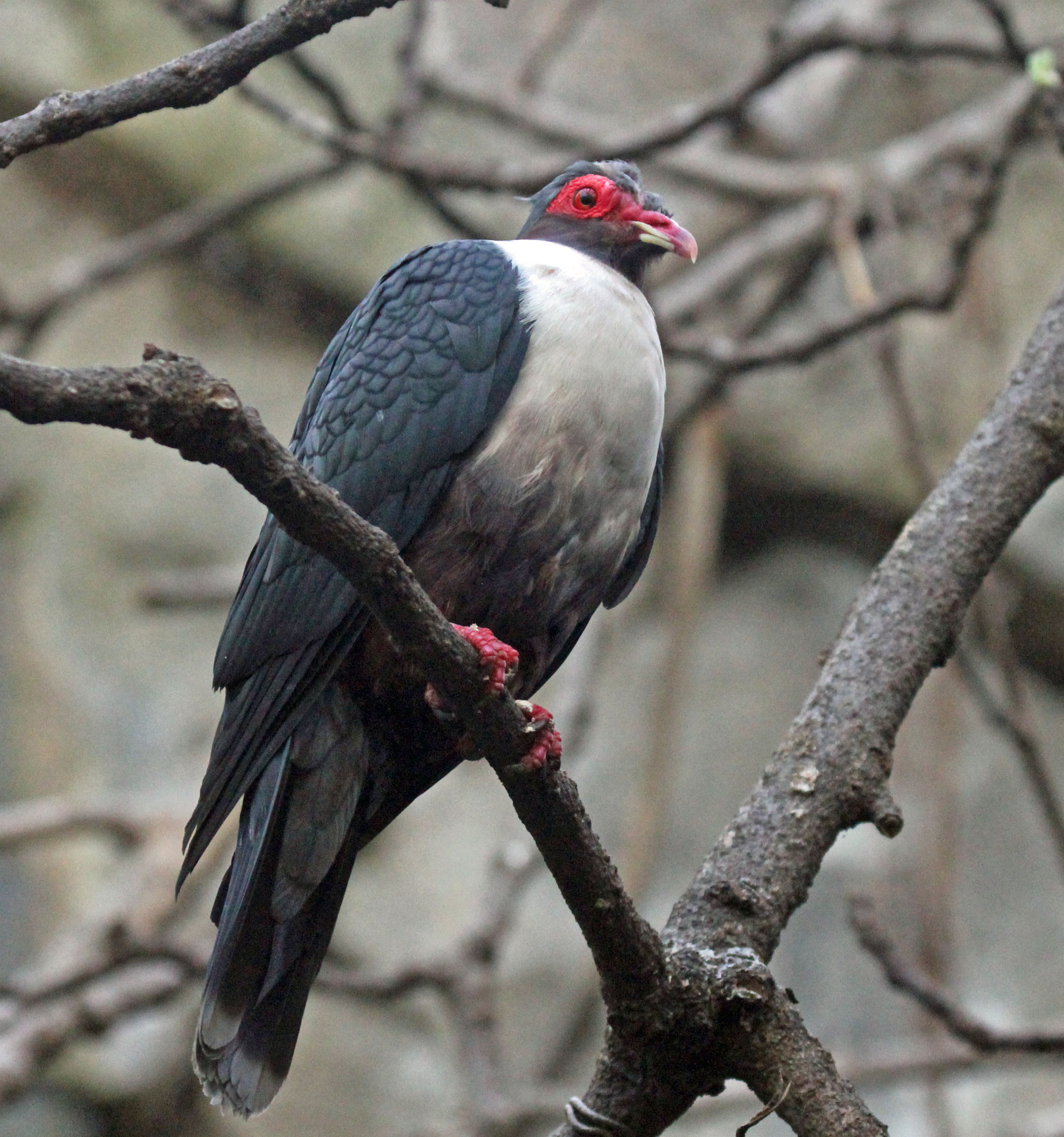
- Papuan mountain pigeon

Scientific classification
- Kingdom: Animalia
- Phylum: Chordata
- Class: Aves
- Order: Columbiformes
- Family: Columbidae
- Tribe: Ptilinopodini
- Genus: Gymnophaps; Salvadori, 1874

Type species
- Gymnophaps albertisii Salvadori, 1874

= Mountain pigeon =

Genus of birds from Melanesia and Indonesia

Mountain pigeons are four species of birds in the genus Gymnophaps in the pigeon family Columbidae. They are found on islands in eastern Indonesia and western Melanesia, where they inhabit hill and montane forest. Medium-sized pigeons with long tails and wings, they are 33–38.5 cm (13.0–15.2 in) long and weigh 259–385 g (9.1–13.6 oz). They mostly have dull grey, white, or chestnut-brown plumage, their most distinctive feature being bright red skin around the eyes. Males and females mostly look alike, but the Papuan and pale mountain pigeons show slight sexual dimorphism. Mountain pigeons are very social and are usually seen in flocks of 10–40 birds, although some species can form flocks of more than 100 individuals. They are generally quiet and do not make many vocalisations apart from a distinctive whooshing noise while leaving their high-altitude roosts to feed in the morning.

The genus was originally described by the Italian zoologist Tommaso Salvadori in 1874 and currently contains the Papuan, Seram, Buru, and pale mountain pigeons. The species are allopatric (having geographically separated populations) and form a single superspecies. Mountain pigeons are arboreal (tree-inhabiting) and feed on a wide variety of fruit-like figs and drupes, mainly foraging for food in the canopy. Nests can be of two types: a shallow depression in the forest floor or short grass; and a platform of sticks placed at a height of several metres in a tree. Clutches consist of a single white egg. All four species are listed as being of least concern on the IUCN Red List.

== Taxonomy and systematics ==
The genus Gymnophaps was introduced by the Italian zoologist Tommaso Salvadori in 1874 for the Papuan mountain pigeon (Gymnophaps albertisii), which is the type species of the genus. The name Gymnophaps combines the Ancient Greek words γυμνος (gumnos) 'bare' and φαψ (phaps) 'pigeon'. In 1900, after the 1899 description of the Buru mountain pigeon (Gymnophaps mada) as a species of Columba, the German ornithologist Ernst Hartert stated that if Gymnophaps was to be maintained, it would have to include the Buru mountain pigeon as well, although he preferred keeping both the Papuan and Buru mountain pigeons in Columba. The Seram mountain pigeon (Gymnophaps stalkeri), originally described as a separate species, was moved into Gymnophaps as a subspecies of the Buru mountain pigeon in 1927. The German-American ornithologist Ernst Mayr described the pale mountain pigeon (Gymnophaps solomonensis) in 1931. In 2007, the Buru and Seram mountain pigeons were again split as distinct species by the ornithologists Frank Rheindt and Robert Hutchinson on the basis of differences in appearance. All four species in the genus are allopatric (having geographically isolated populations) and can be considered to form a single superspecies.

Gymnophaps was initially thought to be most closely related to Columba, but the Australian ornithologist Tom Iredale suggested in 1956 that it was more closely related to the fruit dove genus Ptilinopus due to its arboreal and frugivorous nature. In 1963, the British ornithologist Derek Goodwin also hypothesised that Gymnophaps was more closely related to Ptilinopus and the imperial pigeon genus Ducula than Columba due to similarities in their plumage. A 2007 mitochondrial and nuclear DNA study of 41 pigeon genera by the Brazilian evolutionary biologist Sergio Pereira and colleagues found that Gymnophaps was most closely related to the topknot pigeon, this clade being sister to (the closest relative of) Hemiphaga. These three genera are further sister to another clade formed by Ptilinopus, the cloven-feathered dove, and Alectroenas, Ducula being the most basal genus in the group. The following cladogram shows the relationships within this group based on the study:

- - Ducula – imperial pigeons (41 species)
  - - - Alectroenas – blue pigeons (4 species of which one is extinct)
      - - Drepanoptila – cloven-feathered dove
        - Ptilinopus – fruit doves (57 species)
    - - Hemiphaga – pigeons (2 species)
      - - Lopholaimus – topknot pigeon
        - Gymnophaps – mountain pigeons (4 species)

=== List of species ===
Mountain pigeon species in taxonomic sequence
Common name	Scientific name (Note: The names and years after the scientific name indicate the binomial authority (scientist who originally named the species) and the year in which the species was described. A binomial authority in parentheses indicates that the species was originally described in a genus other than Gymnophaps.)	Image	IUCN Red List Status	Distribution
Papuan mountain pigeon	Gymnophaps albertisii Salvadori, 1874		LC^{IUCN}	
Buru mountain pigeon	Gymnophaps mada (Hartert, 1899)		LC^{IUCN}	
Seram mountain pigeon	Gymnophaps stalkeri (Ogilvie-Grant, 1911)		LC^{IUCN}	
Pale mountain pigeon	Gymnophaps solomonensis Mayr, 1931		LC^{IUCN}	

== Description ==
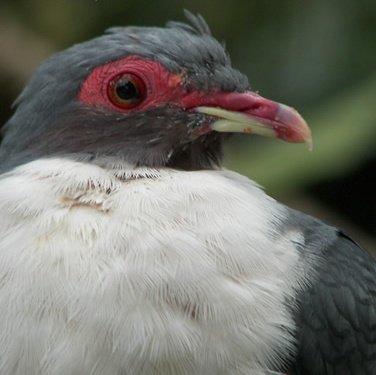
A Papuan mountain pigeon showing the red facial skin distinctive of the genus

All four species of mountain pigeon are medium-sized pigeons with long tails and wings, with lengths ranging from 33–38.5 cm (13.0–15.2 in) and masses of 259–385 g (9.1–13.6 oz). They have dull grey, white, or chestnut-brown plumage and extensive red orbital skin. In most species, both sexes look similar, but the Buru and Papuan mountain pigeon show slight sexual dimorphism. Mountain pigeons can be distinguished from other pigeons by the red skin around the eyes, the bluish-grey mantle, and the scaly patterning on the wings.

Papuan mountain pigeons are 33–36 cm (13–14 in) long and weigh 259 g (9.1 oz) on average. Adult males have slate-grey upperparts, chestnut-maroon throats and bellies, whitish breasts, and a pale grey terminal tail band, with bright red lores and orbital regions. Females are similar but have grayish breasts and grey edges to the throat feathers. The pale mountain pigeon has an average length of 38 cm (15 in) and weighs 310–385 g (10.9–13.6 oz). The head and neck are whitish-grey, the belly and lower breast are buffy-pink, and the vent and undertail coverts are pale grey. The upperparts are smoky-grey with darker fringes on the mantle and wing coverts. Both sexes look similar, but there can be large variations in individual appearance.

Buru mountain pigeons are 33–38.5 cm (13.0–15.2 in) long, and have blue-grey crowns and necks, darker slate-grey upperparts, and white to pale buff-pink throats and breasts that become buff-pink towards the belly. Females are smaller and have more dark red on the breast than males. The Seram mountain pigeon has a buff-pink face and breast, wine-pink underparts, a grey nape, crown, back of neck, and thighs, and dark chestnut belly and underside of the tail.

=== Vocalisations ===
Mountain pigeons are generally silent, but have been recorded giving a deep woooooo m or woom, soft whistles, a wheezy vrrhu, and a quiet vruu.

== Distribution and habitat ==
Mountain pigeons are all found on islands in the Maluku Islands and Melanesia. The Papuan mountain pigeon is found on New Guinea, Yapen, the D'Entrecasteaux Islands, the Bismarck Archipelago, and Bacan. The Buru mountain pigeon is endemic to Buru and the Seram mountain pigeon is endemic to Seram. The pale mountain pigeon is endemic to the Solomon Islands archipelago, where it is found on Bougainville, Kolombangara, Vangunu, Guadalcanal and Malaita.

All four species in the genus inhabit hill and montane forests, but frequently visit lowlands to feed. Some species also show seasonal movements; large flocks of the Papuan mountain pigeon in the Schrader Range descend to visit beech forests during the rainy season from October to March.

== Behaviour and ecology ==
All four species of mountain pigeons are highly gregarious, usually being found in flocks of 10–40 birds; flocks of the Papuan mountain pigeon have as many as 80 birds. Flocks of the pale mountain pigeon near fruiting trees can have more than 100 individuals. Less commonly, mountain pigeons can also be found singly or in pairs.

Mountain pigeons generally roost high in mountains and descend in flocks to feed in the mornings. While doing so, they can drop hundreds of metres in a single dive, making a loud whooshing noise with their wings that is distinctive of the genus. The birds fly low above trees while leaving the roost, but fly very high while crossing lowlands.

=== Feeding ===
Mountain pigeons are arboreal (tree-inhabiting) frugivores, feeding on a variety of fruit such as figs and drupes. They mostly forage in the canopy, although they are also sometimes found in the midstorey or understorey. In the pale mountain pigeon, birds that are disturbed during foraging fly explosively out of the tree. The Papuan mountain pigeon will fly long distances to visit specific species of fruiting plants; others have been recorded feeding on trees near the coast. The Papuan mountain pigeon has been recorded drinking water from puddles on the roadside and eating soil.

=== Breeding ===
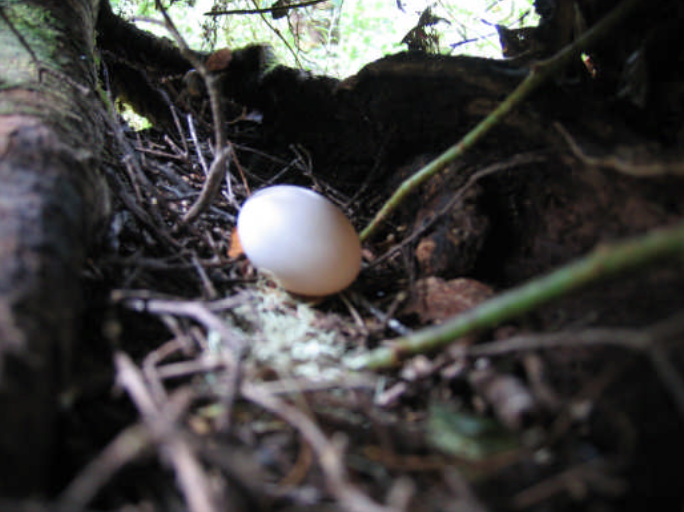
Egg of the Seram mountain pigeon

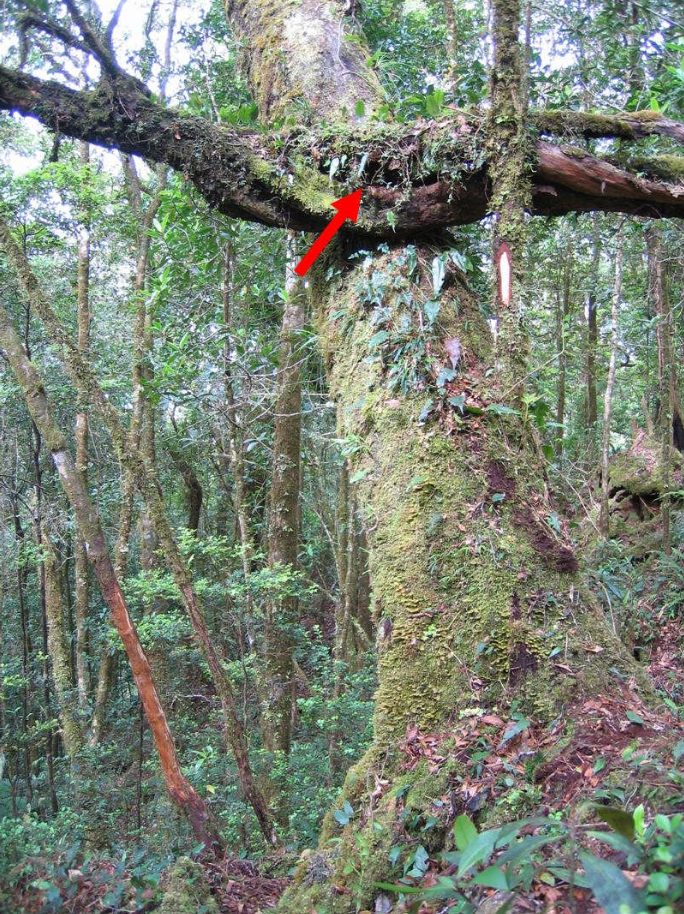
Tree on which a Seram mountain pigeon nest was found (red arrow pointing towards nest)

A display flight has been observed during the breeding season in the Papuan and Seram mountain pigeons. In the Papuan mountain pigeon, one or two males consort with a female from an open perch overlooking a steep drop, after which one male launches himself and dives down before suddenly rising 25–30 m (82–98 ft) above the forest canopy with rapid wingbeats. The male then stalls at the top of this rise and plummets again before returning to his perch. This is repeated periodically, both males taking turns to display to the female. Male Seram mountain pigeons perform a similar display, but fly lower, less steeply, and continue to fly forward after descending instead of returning to the perch immediately.

The Papuan mountain pigeon's breeding season lasts from October to March in the Schrader Range, but it may breed throughout the year in other parts of its range. The pale mountain pigeon has been observed breeding from July to September. The only known nest of the Seram mountain pigeon was seen in September. Nothing is known about the Buru mountain pigeon's breeding.

Mountain pigeons nests can be of two types: a shallow depression in the forest floor or short grass; and a platform of sticks placed at a height of several metres in a tree. The Papuan mountain pigeon is thought to nest in a partially colonial manner. The Papuan, pale, and Seram mountain pigeons all lay clutches of one white egg; the Buru mountain pigeon's clutch size is not known.

=== Predators and parasites ===
Mountain pigeons have been recorded being parasitised by the feather louse Columbicola galei. They may be hunted by the pygmy eagle.

== Status ==
The International Union for Conservation of Nature lists all four species of mountain pigeons as being of least concern due to their stable populations and sufficiently large ranges. The Papuan mountain pigeon is common on New Guinea, but local populations can vary widely. It is generally uncommon on New Britain and New Ireland and is thought to also be uncommon on Bacan. The pale mountain pigeon is also moderately common throughout its range and is very common on Kolombangara, where it roosts in flocks of hundreds. The population of the Buru mountain pigeon was estimated at 43,000 in 1989 and is currently thought to be between 20,000 and 50,000. The Seram mountain pigeon's population has not been estimated, but it is reportedly commoner on Seram than the Buru mountain pigeon is on Buru.
