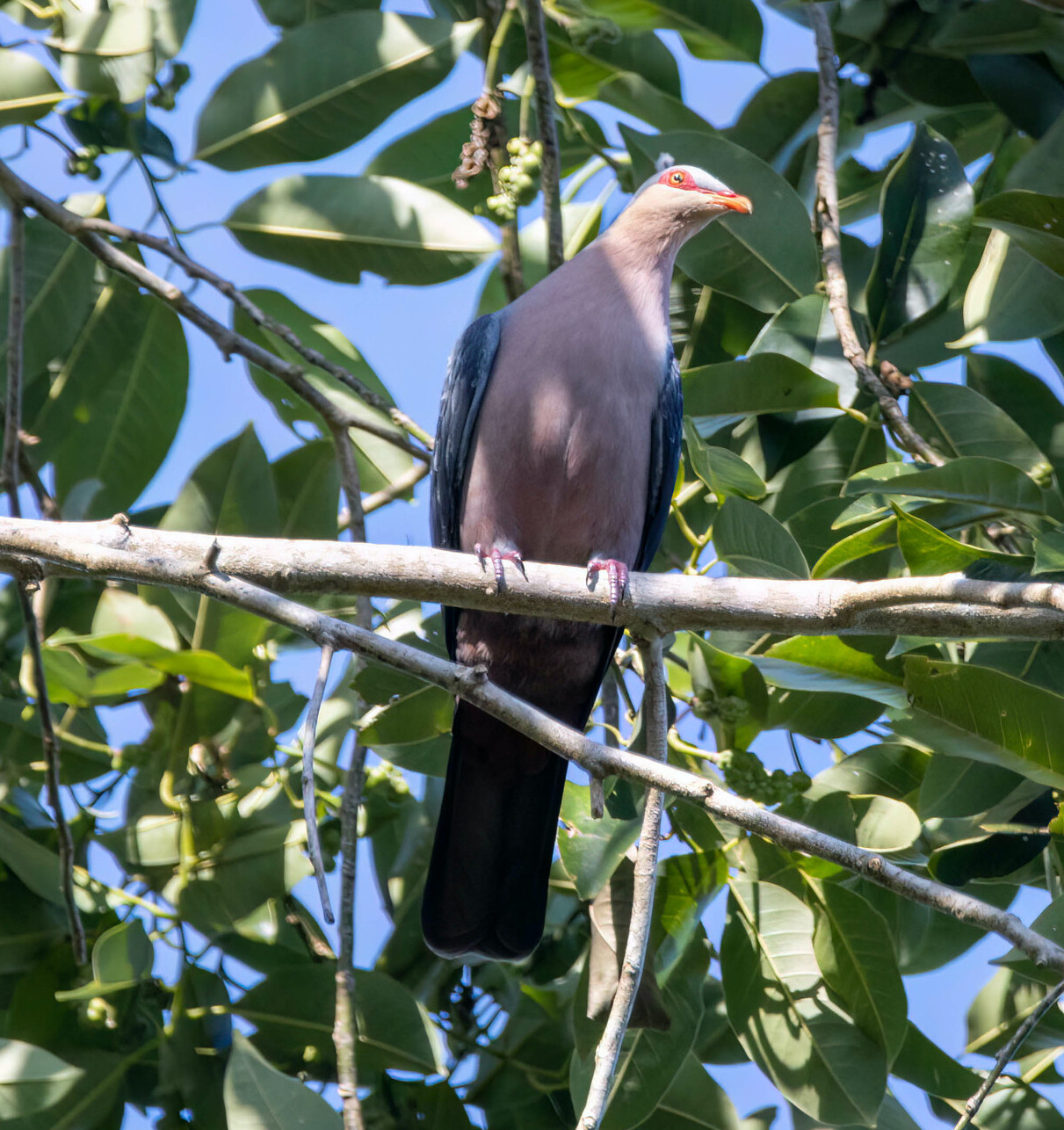

Conservation status
- Least Concern (IUCN 3.1)

Scientific classification
- Kingdom: Animalia
- Phylum: Chordata
- Class: Aves
- Order: Columbiformes
- Family: Columbidae
- Genus: Gymnophaps
- Species: G. stalkeri

Binomial name
- Gymnophaps stalkeri (Ogilvie-Grant, 1911)

Synonyms
- Columba stalkeri Ogilvie-Grant, 1911; Gymnophaps mada stalkeri (Ogilvie-Grant, 1911)

= Seram mountain pigeon =

Species of bird from Seram, Indonesia

The Seram mountain pigeon (Gymnophaps stalkeri) is a species of bird in the pigeon family Columbidae that is endemic to the island of Seram in Indonesia, where it inhabits hill forest. It was long considered to be a subspecies of the Buru mountain pigeon, but was split on the basis of differences in appearance. It is a medium-sized pigeon with a buff-pink face and breast, wine-pink underparts, a grey nape, crown, back of neck, and thighs, and dark chestnut belly and underside of the tail.

The Seram mountain pigeon feeds on fruit and feeds in flocks of up to 50 birds. The only known nest was observed in September in old-growth montane forest and contained one egg. It is listed as being of least concern by the International Union for Conservation of Nature (IUCN) on the IUCN Red List due to its stable population and sufficiently large range.

== Taxonomy and systematics ==
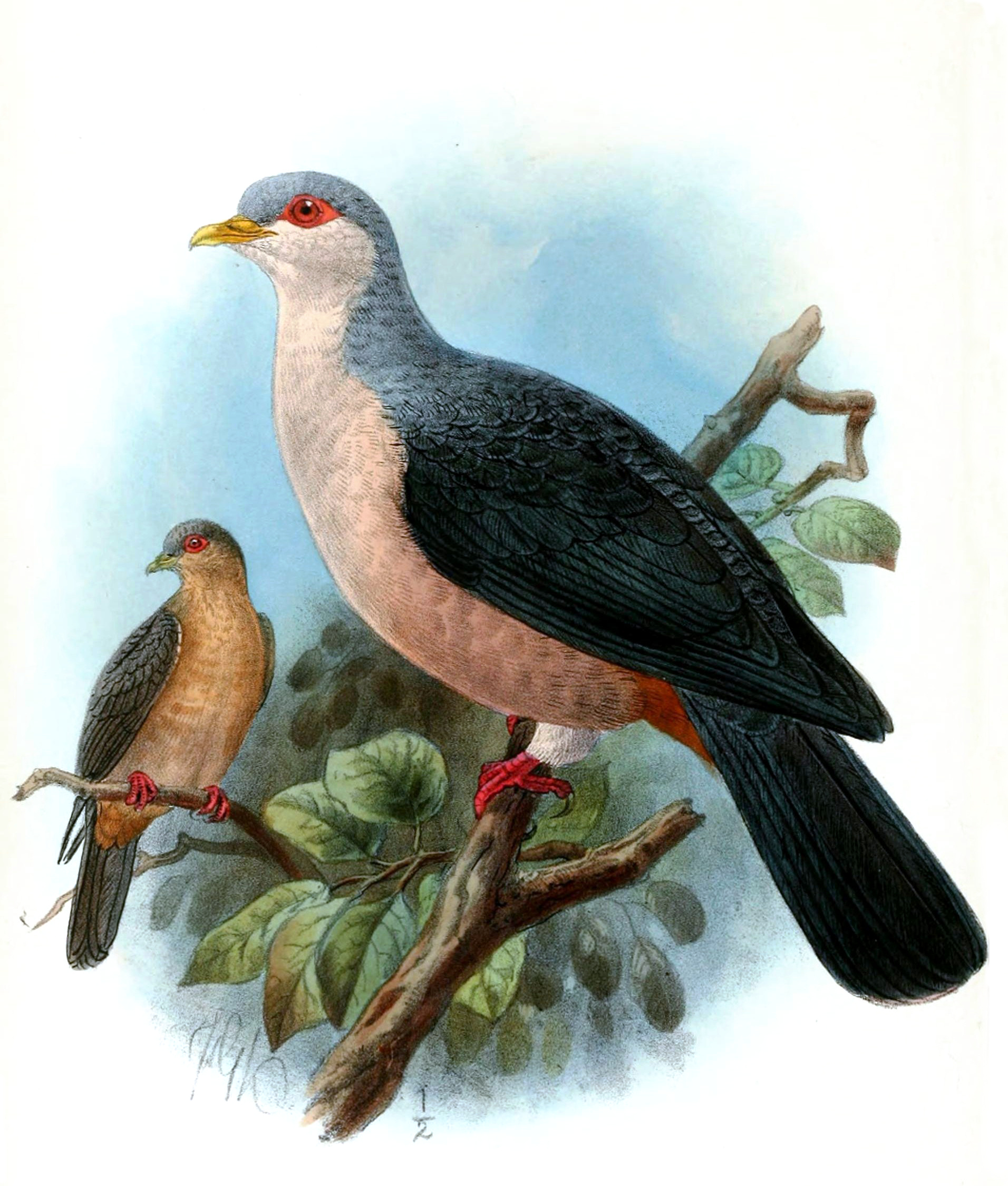
An illustration of the closely related Buru mountain pigeon

The Seram mountain pigeon was described as Columba stalkeri by the Scottish ornithologist William Ogilvie-Grant in 1911 on the basis of specimens from the Kanobi Mountains on Seram, Indonesia. It was subsequently merged with the Buru mountain pigeon in the genus Gymnophaps by the Australian amateur ornithologist Gregory Mathews in 1927. It was again split as a distinct species on basis of differences in appearance in 2007 by Frank Rheindt and Robert Hutchinson.

The generic name Gymnophaps is derived from the Ancient Greek words γυμνος (gumnos), meaning bare, and φαψ (phaps), meaning pigeon. The specific name stalkeri is in honour of Wilfred Stalker, an Australian natural history collector who collected the type specimens of the species on a British Ornithologists' Union expedition. Seram mountain pigeon is the official common name designated by the International Ornithologists' Union. Other common names for the species include Seram long-tailed mountain-pigeon.

The Seram mountain pigeon is one of four species in the mountain pigeon genus Gymnophaps, which is found in Melanesia and the Maluku Islands. It forms a superspecies with the other species in its genus. Within its family, the genus Gymnophaps is sister to Lopholaimus, and these two together form a clade sister to Hemiphaga. The species has no subspecies.

== Description ==
The Seram mountain pigeon is a medium-sized pigeon that is 33–38.5 cm (13.0–15.2 in) long and weighs 330–338 g (11.6–11.9 oz). It has a deep buff-pink face and breast, paler on the chin, changing to wine-pink on the underparts. The thighs are grey and the nape, crown, and back of neck are pale, pure blue-grey, while the belly and underside of the tail are dark chestnut with wine-grey fringes to the feathers. The eyes are scarlet to yellow with purplish red to scarlet orbital skin, the bill is yellow with a purple cere, and the legs are purple. Juveniles have browner upperparts, have browner underparts, and are darker below the tail. They also have dull red orbital skin, dull red legs, and a white-tipped grey bill with a dull red cere.

== Distribution and habitat ==
The Seram mountain pigeon is endemic to Seram in the Maluku Islands. It mainly inhabits hill forest at elevations of 400–2,300 m (1,300–7,500 ft), but is typically more common above 1,200 m (3,900 ft). One record of the species found seven individuals at an elevation of 100 m (330 ft).

== Behaviour and ecology ==
The species is very social, frequently being seen in flocks of over 20 birds. It feeds on fruit. Foraging flocks can have over 20 birds, with some being as large as 50 individuals.

=== Breeding ===
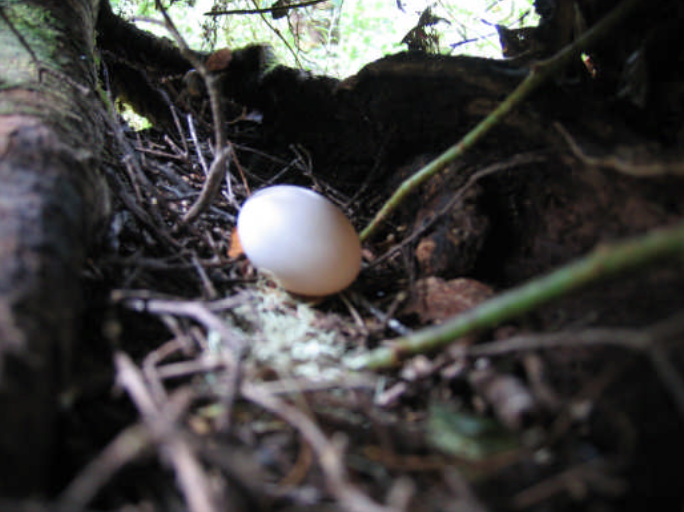
Egg in nest

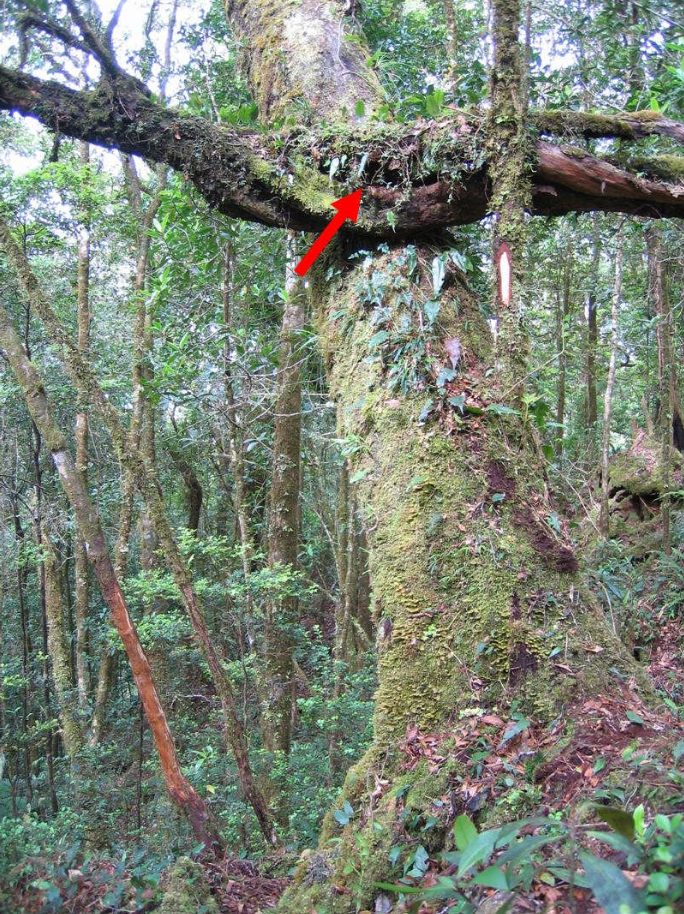
Tree on which a Seram mountain pigeon nest was found

The Seram mountain pigeon has been observed making a display flight in February. The display is similar to that of Papuan mountain pigeons, males of which launch themselves upwards from a perch before plummeting down and returning. However, the display of the Seram mountain pigeon is lower and less steep, and it continues flying forward after descending instead of returning to the perch immediately.

Its only known nest was observed in September in primary montane forest at an elevation of 2,300 m (7,500 ft). The nest was placed in a crevice on a dead, mossy branch 2.5 m (8.2 ft) above the ground. It was lined loosely with twigs and moss, and contained a single white egg.

== Status ==
The Seram mountain pigeon is listed as being of least concern by the International Union for Conservation of Nature (IUCN) on the IUCN Red List due to its stable population and sufficiently large range. Its population has not been estimated, but it is reported as being more common than the Buru mountain pigeon is on Buru, and is especially common at altitudes of 1,300–1,700 m (4,300–5,600 ft).
