= Long-tailed mountain pigeon =

The long-tailed mountain pigeon has been split into two species:

- Buru mountain pigeon, Gymnophaps mada
- Seram mountain pigeon, Gymnophaps stalkeri
