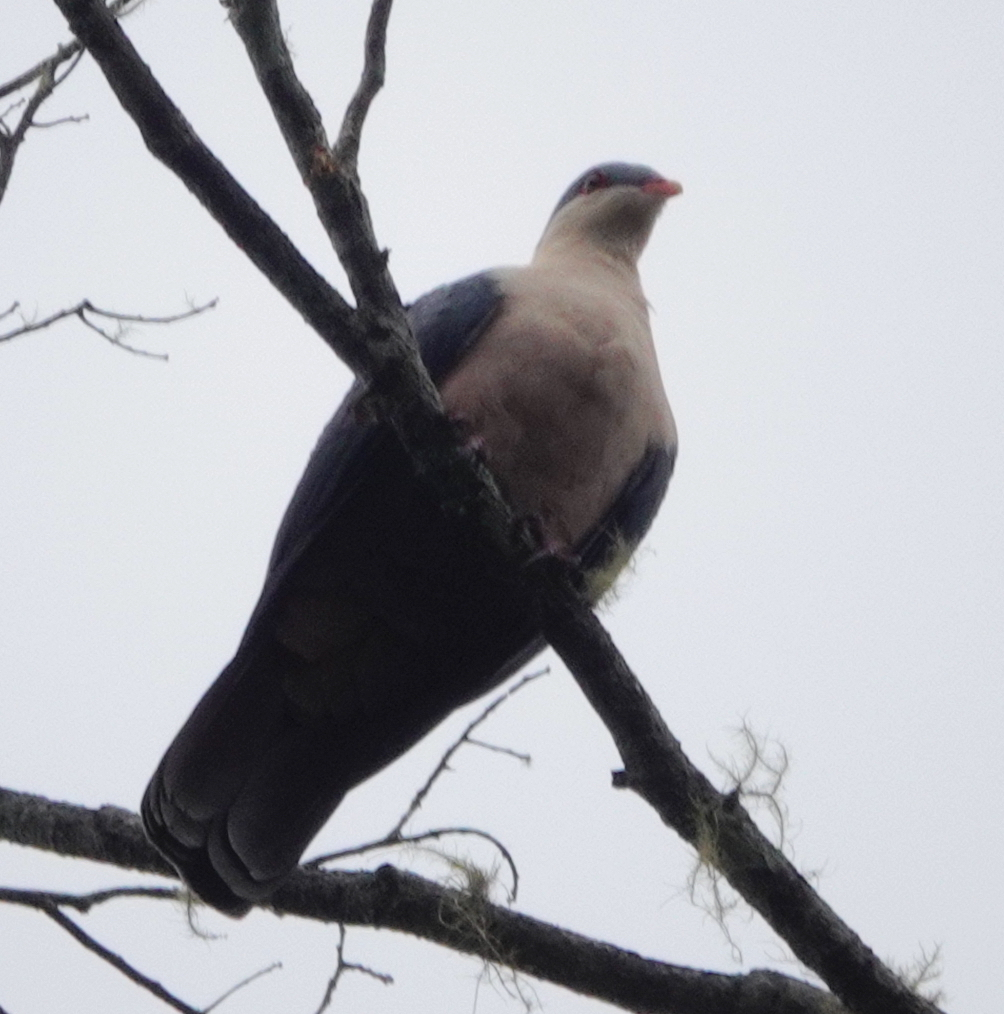

Conservation status
- Least Concern (IUCN 3.1)

Scientific classification
- Kingdom: Animalia
- Phylum: Chordata
- Class: Aves
- Order: Columbiformes
- Family: Columbidae
- Genus: Gymnophaps
- Species: G. mada

Binomial name
- Gymnophaps mada (Hartert, 1899)

Synonyms
- Columba mada Hartert, 1899

= Buru mountain pigeon =

Species of bird from Buru, Indonesia

The Buru mountain pigeon, formerly also long-tailed mountain pigeon (Gymnophaps mada) is a species of bird in the pigeon family Columbidae. It is endemic to Indonesia and inhabits montane forest and disturbed lowland forest on Buru. It was formerly considered to be conspecific with the Seram mountain pigeon. It is a medium-sized pigeon 33–38.5 cm (13.0–15.2 in) long, and has a blue-grey crown and neck, darker slate-grey upperparts, and a white to pale buff-pink throat and breast that becomes buff-pink towards the belly. The species is slightly sexually dimorphic, with females being smaller and having more dark red on the breast.

The Buru mountain pigeon feeds on fruit. Its breeding season is thought to be from October to December. It is listed as being of least concern by the International Union for Conservation of Nature (IUCN) on the IUCN Red List due to a sufficiently large range and a stable population. The population is estimated to be 20,000–49,999.

== Taxonomy and systematics ==
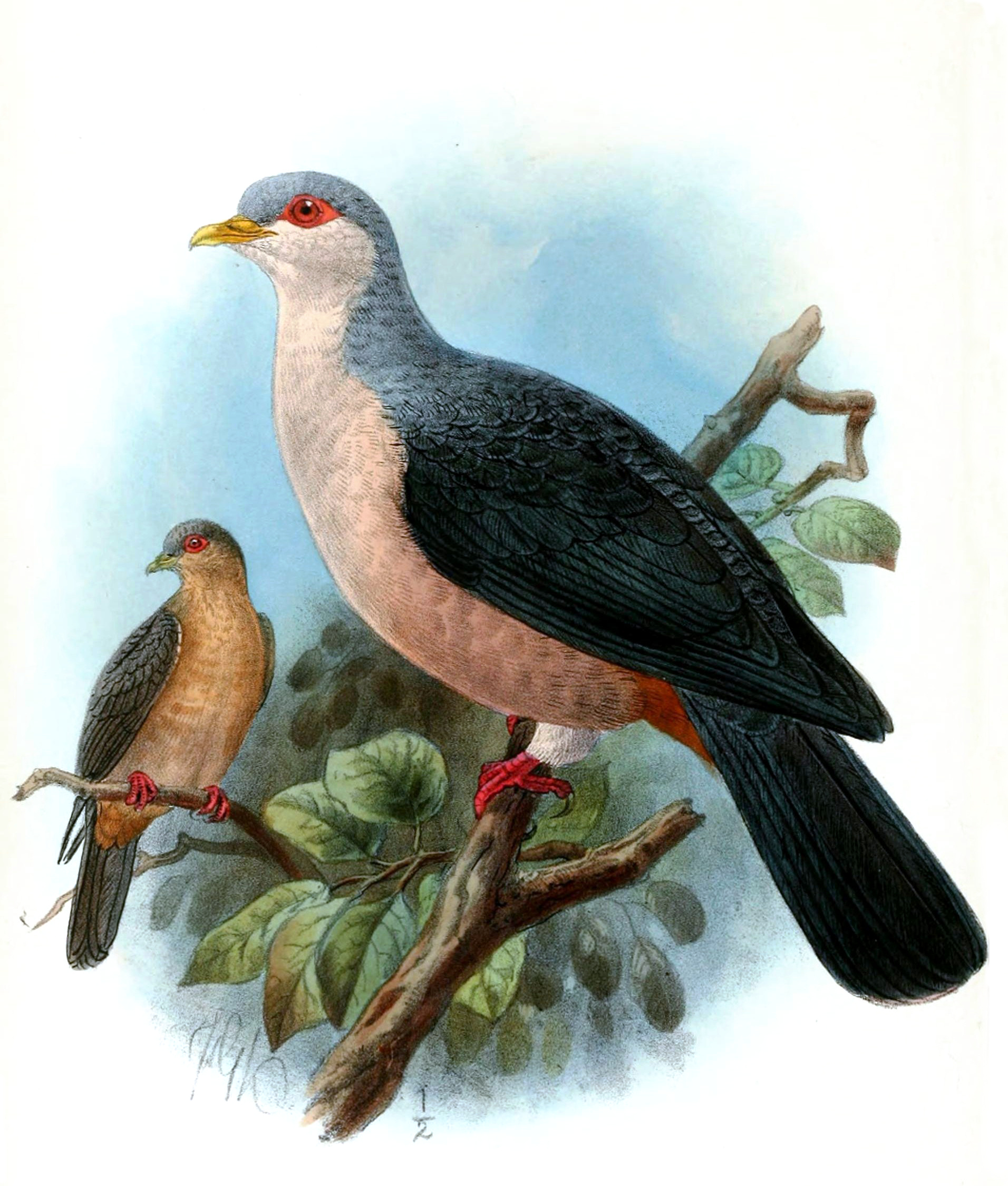
Illustration by John Gerrard Keulemans

The Buru mountain pigeon was described as Columba mada by the German ornithologist Ernst Hartert in 1899 on the basis of specimens from Mount Mada on Buru, Indonesia. In 1900, he stated that if the genus Gymnophaps (which then only contained the Papuan mountain pigeon) was to be maintained, it would have to include the Buru mountain pigeon as well, although he preferred keeping both the Papuan and Buru mountain pigeons in Columba. Later, James L. Peters, in his 1937 Check-list of the Birds of the World, placed both of these species in Gymnophaps.

The name of the genus, Gymnophaps, is derived from the Ancient Greek words γυμνος (gumnos), meaning bare, and φαψ (phaps), meaning pigeon. The specific epithet mada is from Mount Mada, the species' type locality (place where the first specimen of the species was found). Buru mountain pigeon is the official common name designated by the International Ornithologists' Union. Other common names for the species include Mada mountain pigeon and long-tailed mountain-pigeon.

The Buru mountain pigeon is one of four species in the mountain pigeon genus Gymnophaps, which is found in Melanesia and the Maluku Islands. It forms a superspecies with the other species in the genus. Within its family, the genus Gymnophaps is sister to Lopholaimus, and these two together form a clade sister to Hemiphaga. The Seram mountain pigeon was previously considered to be a subspecies of the Buru mountain pigeon, but was split on the basis of differences in appearance in 2007 by Frank Rheindt and Robert Hutchinson. The Buru mountain pigeon is now treated as having no subspecies.

== Description ==
The Buru mountain pigeon is a medium-sized pigeon with a slender build, and long wings and tail, measuring 33–38.5 cm (13.0–15.2 in) long. Adult males have blue-grey crowns, napes, and hindnecks, with darker mantles. The rest of the upperparts are slightly glossy dark slate-grey. The flight feathers on the wings and tail are greenish-black, while the primaries and the ends of the flight feathers on the tail have narrow pale fringes. The face, throat, and upper breast are white to pale buff-pink, while the belly is buff-pink. The feathers on the upper leg are pale buff. The iris is grey, pale brown or yellow, with a red or orange outer ring. The beak is ashy-yellow with a red base, and the legs are purplish to brownish-red. The species shows slight sexual dimorphism, with females being smaller on average and having more wine on the breast, along with dark blackish-red bills and ceres. Juveniles have browner upperparts, dusky mottling on the throat and breast, and more ochre on the belly. They also have a white-tipped grey bill, a dull red cere, and dull red legs.

=== Vocalisations ===
The Buru mountain pigeon's vocalisations are unknown, but it is likely silent most of the time like other Gymnophaps pigeons.

== Distribution and habitat ==
The Buru mountain pigeon is endemic to Buru in the Maluku Islands. It mainly inhabits hill and montane forests, and occasionally visits lowland disturbed forests to feed. It has been recorded at elevations of 0–2,060 m (0–6,759 ft), but mainly occurs at 650–1,760 m (2,130–5,770 ft).

== Behaviour and ecology ==
Buru mountain pigeon usually occurs alone or in pairs, and in small flocks with up to 11 birds from October to December. During other parts of the year, it may also form larger groups. It roosts high in the mountains, and flies to the lowlands in the morning to feed, returning to the roosts in the evening. The species is frugivorous and most likely feeds on fruit in the canopy. It has been observed visiting coastal fruiting trees. The breeding season may be from October to December.

== Status ==
The Buru mountain pigeon is listed as being of least concern by the International Union for Conservation of Nature (IUCN) on the IUCN Red List due to a sufficiently large range and a stable population. A 1989 estimate placed its population at 43,000 individuals, and the population is currently estimated to number 20,000–49,999 birds. Montane forests throughout its range are relatively undisturbed, and the species does not seem to face any significant threats.
