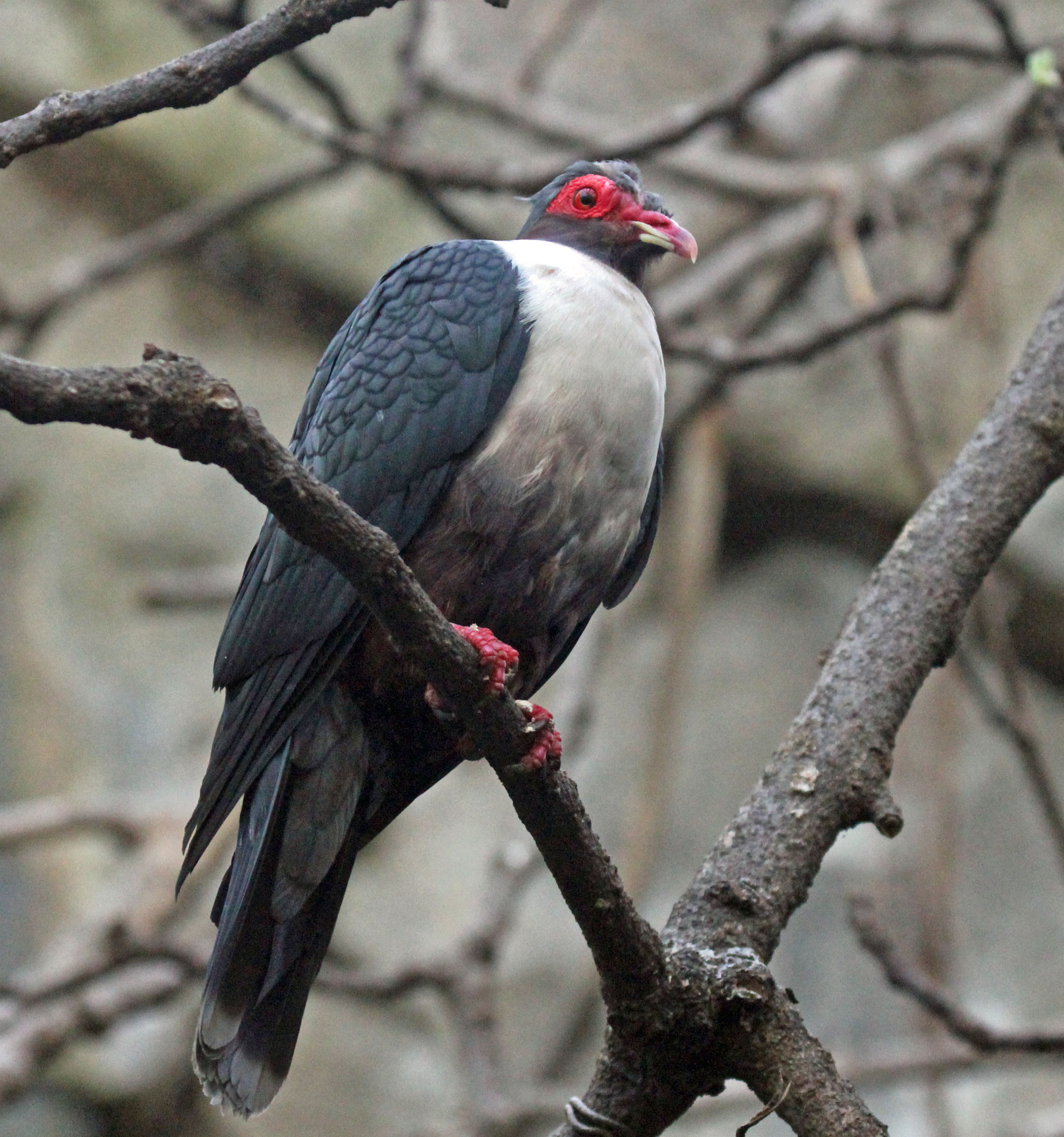

Conservation status
- Least Concern (IUCN 3.1)

Scientific classification
- Kingdom: Animalia
- Phylum: Chordata
- Class: Aves
- Order: Columbiformes
- Family: Columbidae
- Genus: Gymnophaps
- Species: G. albertisii

Binomial name
- Gymnophaps albertisii Salvadori, 1874

Synonyms
- Columba albertisii exsul Hartert, 1903

= Papuan mountain pigeon =

Species of bird native to New Guinea and eastern Indonesia

The Papuan mountain pigeon (Gymnophaps albertisii) is a species of bird in the pigeon family, Columbidae. It is found in the Bacan Islands, New Guinea, the D'Entrecasteaux Islands, and the Bismarck Archipelago, where it inhabits primary forest, montane forest, and lowlands. It is a medium-sized species of pigeon, being 33–36 cm (13–14 in) long and weighing 259 g (9.1 oz) on average. Adult males have slate-grey upperparts, chestnut-maroon throats and bellies, whitish breasts, and a pale grey terminal tail band. The lores and orbital region are bright red. Females are similar, but have grayish breasts and grey edges to the throat feathers.

The Papuan mountain pigeon is frugivorous, feeding on figs and drupes. It breeds from October to March in the Schrader Range, but may breed throughout the year across its range. It builds nests out of sticks and twigs in a tree or makes a ground nest in short dry grass, and lays a single egg. The species is very social and is usually seen in flocks of 10–40 birds, although some groups can have as many as 80 individuals. It is listed as being of least concern by the International Union for Conservation of Nature (IUCN) on the IUCN Red List due to its large range and lack of significant population decline.

== Taxonomy and systematics ==
The Papuan mountain pigeon was described as Gymnophaps albertisii by the Italian zoologist Tommaso Salvadori in 1874 on the basis of specimens from Andai, New Guinea. It is the type species of the genus Gymnophaps, which was created for it. The generic name is derived from the Ancient Greek words γυμνος (gumnos), meaning 'bare', and φαψ (phaps), meaning 'pigeon'. The specific name albertisii is in honour of Luigi D'Albertis, an Italian botanist and zoologist who worked in the East Indies and New Guinea. Papuan mountain pigeon is the official common name designated by the International Ornithologists' Union. Other common names for the species include mountain pigeon (which is also used for Gymnophaps pigeons in general), bare-eyed mountain pigeon, bare-eyed pigeon (which is also used for Patagioenas corensis), and D'Albertis's mountain pigeon.

The Papuan mountain pigeon is one of four species in the mountain pigeon genus Gymnophaps in the pigeon family Columbidae, which is found in Melanesia and the Maluku Islands. It forms a superspecies with the other species in its genus. Within its family, the genus Gymnophaps is sister to Lopholaimus, and these two together form a clade sister to Hemiphaga. The Papuan mountain pigeon has two subspecies: (Note: A binominal authority in parentheses indicates that the species was originally described in a genus other than Gymnophaps.)

- G. a. albertisii Salvadori, 1874: The nominate subspecies, it is found on Yapen, New Britain, New Ireland, Fergusson Island, Goodenough Island, and the mountains of New Guinea.
- G. a. exsul Hartert, 1903: It is found on the Bacan Islands. Individuals are larger and darker than those of the nominate subspecies, while the head is entirely slate in color, without the chestnut-maroon chins, throats, and ears of nominate males.

== Description ==
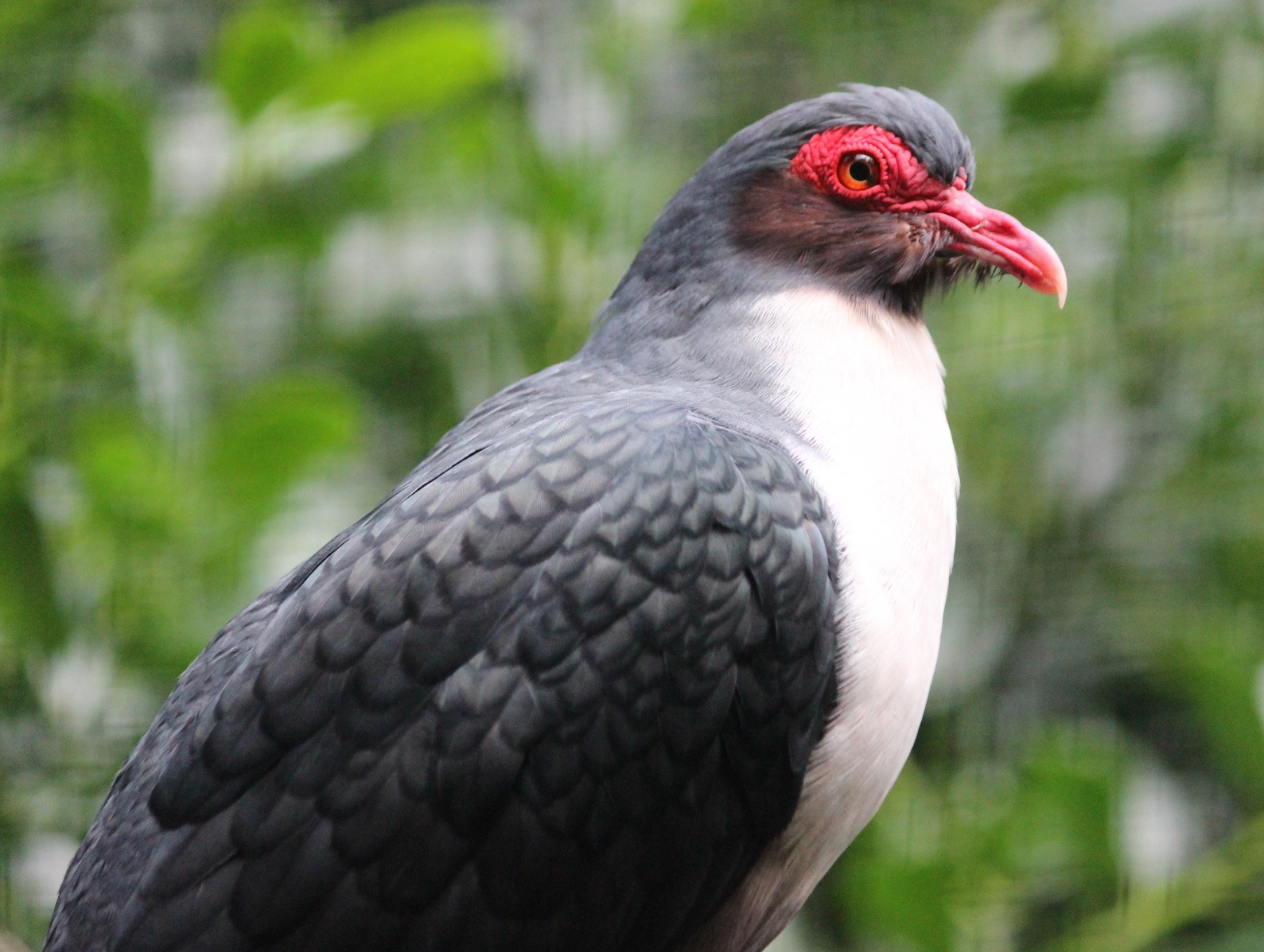
An individual at the Walsrode Bird Park

The Papuan mountain pigeon is a medium-sized pigeon that is 33–36 cm (13–14 in) long and weighs 259 g (9.1 oz) on average. It has a slender appearance with a long tail and wings. Adult males of the nominate subspecies have head and upperparts slate-grey, with chestnut-maroon throats and bellies, whitish breasts, and grey undertail coverts. There is a pale grey terminal band on the tail. The lores and orbital region are bright red, while the bill is pink with a reddish base. The feet are purplish to pinkish-red. Females may have greyish breasts and grey edges to the throat feathers. Juveniles are duller, with dull brown or grey breasts, pale rufous underparts, and chestnut foreheads.

Pinon's imperial pigeon looks similar to a juvenile Papuan mountain pigeon, but is larger, more heavily built, has a darker bill, and does not have the red of the orbital skin extending to the lores.

=== Vocalisations ===
The Papuan mountain pigeon is usually silent, but gives a muted, low-pitched, upslurred wooooooo m or woom during the breeding season. It also makes soft whistles.

== Distribution and habitat ==
The Papuan mountain pigeon is found on New Guinea, its surrounding islands, and the Bacan Islands. It is mainly found in primary forest in hills and mountains, but occasionally visits nearby lowlands and may be common down to sea level in some areas. The nominate subspecies is mainly found at elevations of 0–3,350 m (0–10,991 ft), but exsul is found in montane forest at elevations of 900–1,500 m (3,000–4,900 ft). A dead Papuan mountain pigeon was found at an elevation of 4,450 m (14,600 ft) on the Carstensz Glacier, and is thought to have been crossing the New Guinea Highlands.

The Papuan mountain pigeon is thought to be partially migratory, with large flocks in the Schrader Range descending to visit beech forests during the rainy season from October to March. It also moves to lower altitudes while foraging.

== Behaviour and ecology ==
The Papuan mountain pigeon is a highly social species, occurring in flocks that usually contain 10–40 birds and that can sometimes have up to 80 individuals. It is also less commonly seen singly or in pairs. Individuals usually roost at high elevations, and then descend to lower elevations in flocks in the morning. While doing so, they can drop hundreds of metres in a single dive, producing a loud whooshing sound that is distinctive of Gymnophaps pigeons. While leaving the roost, flocks fly just above the treetops, but begin flying higher when crossing lowlands, sometimes flying high enough to be barely visible to the naked eye.

=== Diet ===
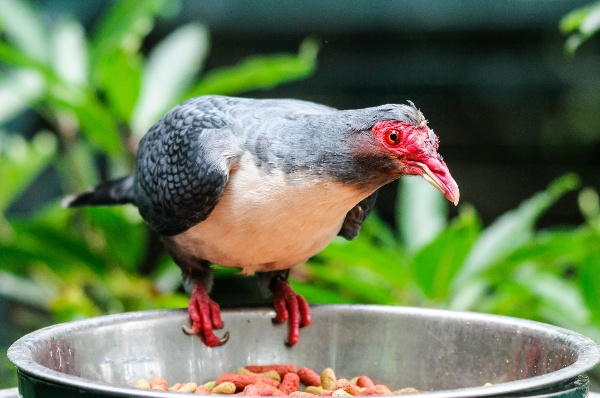
Papuan mountain pigeon feeding

The Papuan mountain pigeon is frugivorous, and feeds on fruit such as figs and drupes from Planchonella, Ascarina philippinensis, and Cryptocarpa tessalata. It has also been observed feeding on the fruits of Elmerrillia tsiampaca, and may be an important seed disperser for that species. The species prefers fruit with larger seeds, with Lauraceae forming an important part of its diet, and will fly long distances during the fruiting seasons of particular plants. Foraging occurs in the canopy, and the species has been observed drinking from roadside puddles. It has also been observed eating soil.

=== Breeding ===
From July to December, as well as in April, male Papuan mountain pigeons have been observed performing display flights. One or two males consort with a female from an open perch overlooking a steep drop, after which one male launches himself and dives down before suddenly rising 25–30 m (82–98 ft) above the forest canopy with rapid wingbeats. The male then stalls at the top of this rise and plummets again before returning to his perch. This is repeated periodically, with both males taking turns to display to the female. The display has only been recorded in the early morning and late afternoon.

The Papuan mountain pigeon breeds from October to March in the Schrader Range, but a juvenile and an adult male with enlarged testicles have been collected in June elsewhere, suggesting that the species may breed throughout the year across its range. Nesting is thought to be partially colonial. Early in the wet season, the species nests in low, sheltered areas, but nests in higher, more exposed areas towards the end. The nest is usually a platform of sticks and twigs built on a small tree at a height of 3.7–5 m (12–16 ft), but may be placed higher. A ground nest built in a depression in short dry grass has also been observed above the tree line. It lays a single white egg.

=== Parasites and predators ===
A 2021 study examining specimens of the Papuan mountain pigeon for the presence of quill mites found none. However, the species is parasitised by the feather louse Columbicola galei in New Guinea. The pygmy eagle is a possible predator.

== Status ==
The Papuan mountain pigeon is listed as being of least concern by the International Union for Conservation of Nature (IUCN) on the IUCN Red List due to its large range and lack of significant population decline. The population of the species has not been determined, but is thought to be stable. It is widely distributed and common on New Guinea, although local populations can vary widely. It is generally uncommon on New Britain and New Ireland, but is apparently very common in lowland forest and secondary forest on the former. The subspecies exsul from Bacan is thought to be uncommon, and its current status is unknown. It is locally hunted in New Guinea.
