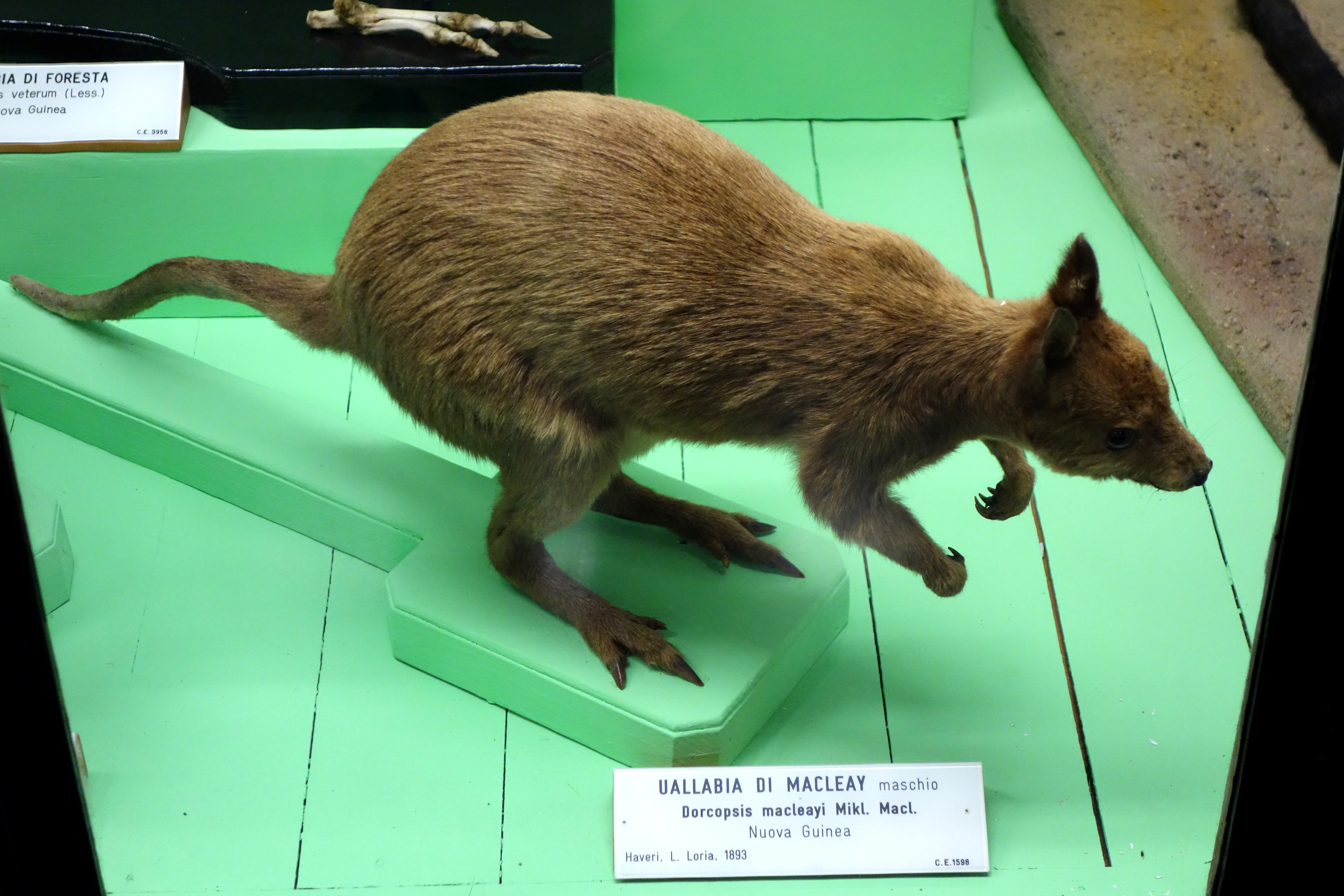

Conservation status
- Least Concern (IUCN 3.1)

Scientific classification
- Kingdom: Animalia
- Phylum: Chordata
- Class: Mammalia
- Infraclass: Marsupialia
- Order: Diprotodontia
- Family: Macropodidae
- Genus: Dorcopsulus
- Species: D. macleayi

Binomial name
- Dorcopsulus macleayi (Miklouho-Maclay, 1885)
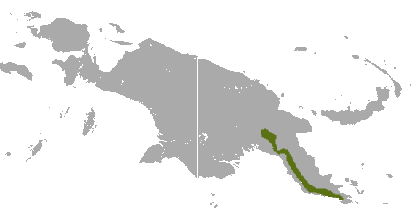
- Macleay's dorcopsis range

= Macleay's dorcopsis =

Species of marsupial

Macleay's dorcopsis (Dorcopsulus macleayi), also known as the Papuan dorcopsis or the Papuan forest wallaby, is a species of marsupial in the family Macropodidae. It is endemic to Papua New Guinea, where its natural habitat is subtropical or tropical dry forest. Being little threatened by habitat destruction, the International Union for Conservation of Nature has rated it as being of "least concern".

== Taxonomy ==
Macleay's dorcopsis was first described by the Russian biologist Nicholas Miklouho-Maclay who named it Dorcopsulus macleayi in honour of the Australian naturalist William John Macleay. It is the type species of the genus. Some authorities consider it to be the same species as the small dorcopsis (Dorcopsulus vanheurni), which has a much wider distribution in New Guinea, but Groves (2005) supports its status as a separate species.

== Description ==
The species is a small, nocturnal forest wallaby with an average weight of about 3 kg (7 lb) and fur that is dense and dark brown to black. It differs from D. vanheurni in having about two-thirds to three-quarters of its tail covered with fur, compared to one half in D. vanheurni.

== Distribution ==
Macleay's dorcopsis is endemic to the southeastern part of the island of New Guinea. It is found in hilly areas and lower montane slopes at altitudes of between 1,000 and 1,800 m (3,300 and 5,900 ft) where it occurs in both primary and secondary tropical moist forest.

== Status ==
At one time considered to be a "vulnerable species", D. macleayi is now listed by the International Union for Conservation of Nature as being of "least concern"; the area where it lives is inaccessible and largely undisturbed, it is a common species and no particular threats have been identified. The indigenous people hunt this species for food to a limited extent, but not to such a degree as to warrant placing it in a more threatened category.
