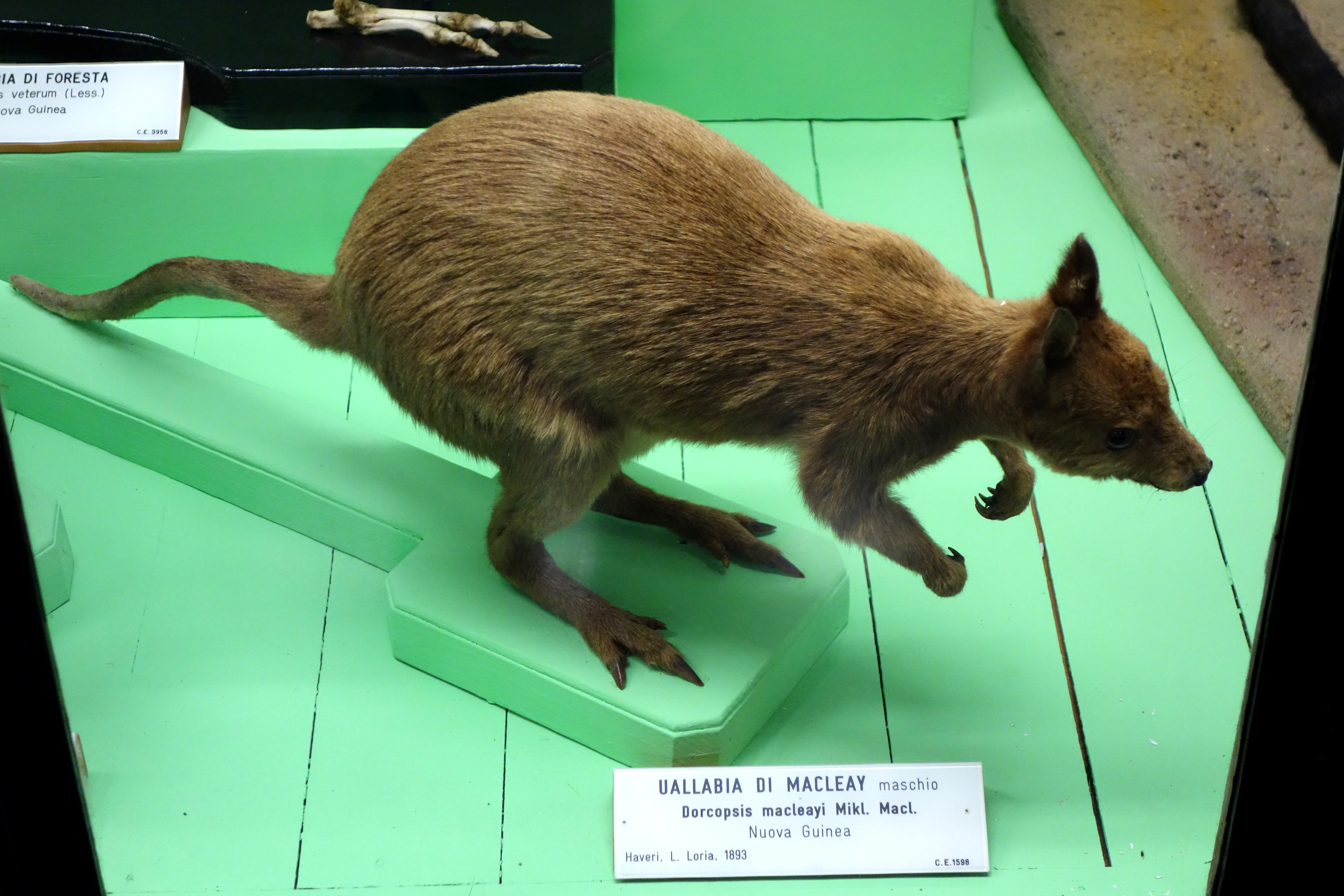
- Dorcopsulus macleayi

Scientific classification
- Kingdom: Animalia
- Phylum: Chordata
- Class: Mammalia
- Infraclass: Marsupialia
- Order: Diprotodontia
- Family: Macropodidae
- Subfamily: Macropodinae
- Genus: Dorcopsulus; Matschie, 1916

Type species
- Dorcopsis macleayi Miklouho-Maclay, 1885

Species
- See text
- Dorcopsulus distribution D. vanheurni in red, D. macleayi in blue

= Dorcopsulus =

Genus of marsupials

Dorcopsulus is a genus of small marsupials in the family Macropodidae, known as forest wallabies. They are native to rainforests and montane forests of New Guinea.

== Species ==
The genus contains the following species:

- Macleay's dorcopsis (Dorcopsulus macleayi)
- Small dorcopsis (Dorcopsulus vanheurni)
