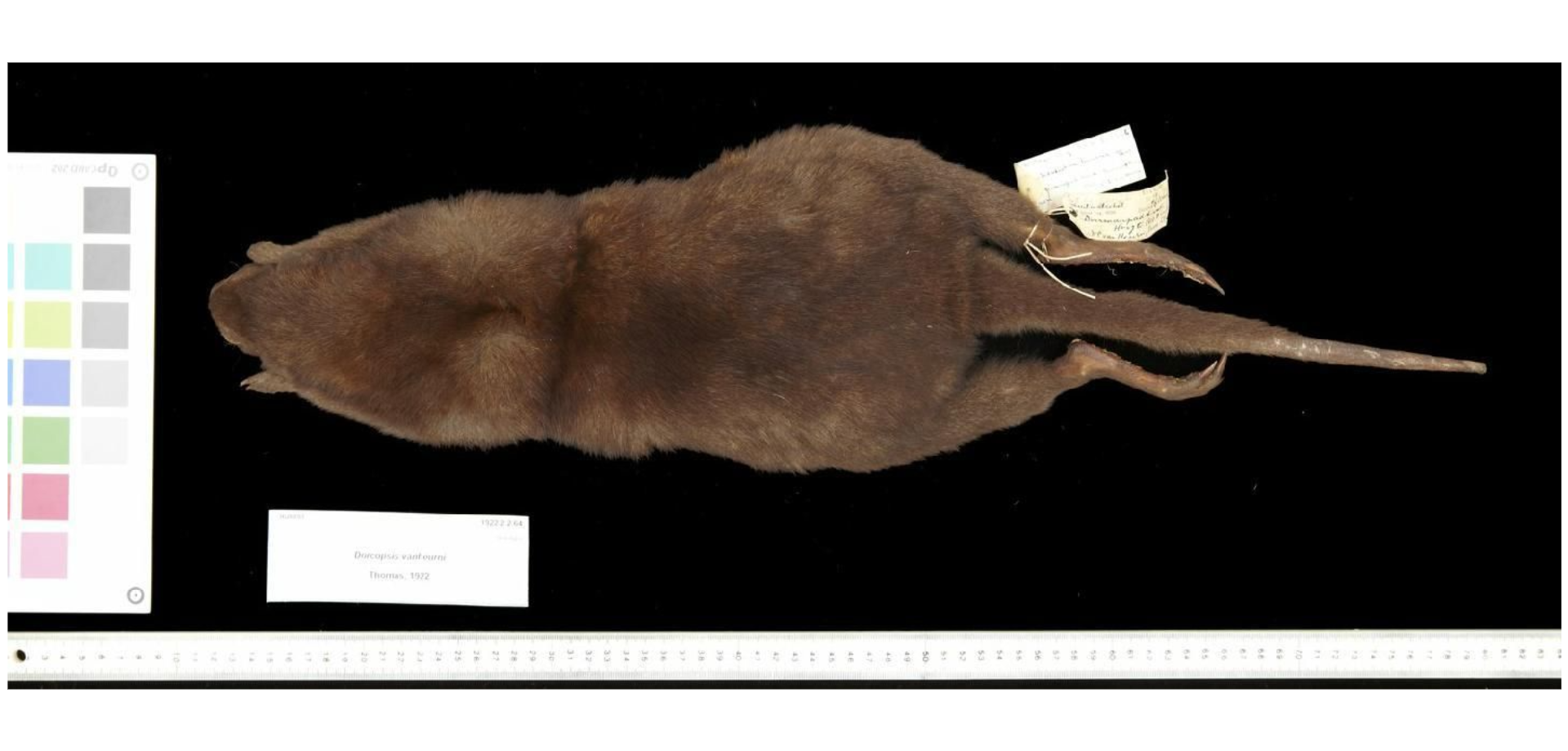

Conservation status
- Near Threatened (IUCN 3.1)

Scientific classification
- Kingdom: Animalia
- Phylum: Chordata
- Class: Mammalia
- Infraclass: Marsupialia
- Order: Diprotodontia
- Family: Macropodidae
- Genus: Dorcopsulus
- Species: D. vanheurni

Binomial name
- Dorcopsulus vanheurni (Thomas, 1922)
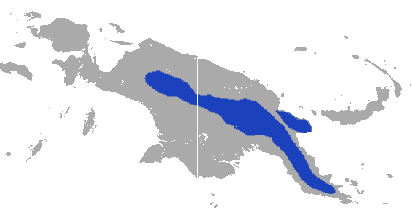
- Small dorcopsis range

= Small dorcopsis =

Species of marsupial

The small dorcopsis or lesser forest wallaby (Dorcopsulus vanheurni) is a species of marsupial in the family Macropodidae. It is found in the mountainous interior of West Papua and Papua New Guinea. Its natural habitat is subtropical or tropical dry forests. It is less common than it used to be and the IUCN has assessed it as being "near threatened".

== Names ==
It is known as sgaw in the Kalam language of Papua New Guinea.

== Distribution and habitat ==
The small dorcopsis is endemic to the island of New Guinea, being present in hill and upland habitats in the central mountain chain, at altitudes between 800 and 3,100 metres (2,600 and 10,200 ft). It used to occur in the Schrader Range, the Hunstein Range and the Torricelli Mountains but no longer does, and it may no longer be present in the Adelbert Range. Its natural habitat is both primary and secondary forests, and forest glades, and it is often found near streams. Each animal has a home range of one to one and a half hectares.

== Use as food ==
The small dorcopsis is one of a number of species of animal used by the Etolo people as food. It is usually caught in traps or taken after being brought down by hunting dogs. The Etolo people cultivate gardens and at the time of preparing and growing the crops resort to trapping as they are too busy to go hunting. At the end of the growing season, from December onwards, they go hunting and catch other animals with few small dorcopsis being taken.

== Status ==
The small dorcopsis is assessed by the International Union for Conservation of Nature as being "near threatened", and even approaching the "vulnerable" category. This is on the basis that it was once a common species but has become much less common, especially near human settlements, because it is hunted for food by the indigenous people and is preyed on by the New Guinea singing dogs which roam in the interior of the island.
