= Advertising in biology =

Use of displays by organisms to signal for selective advantage

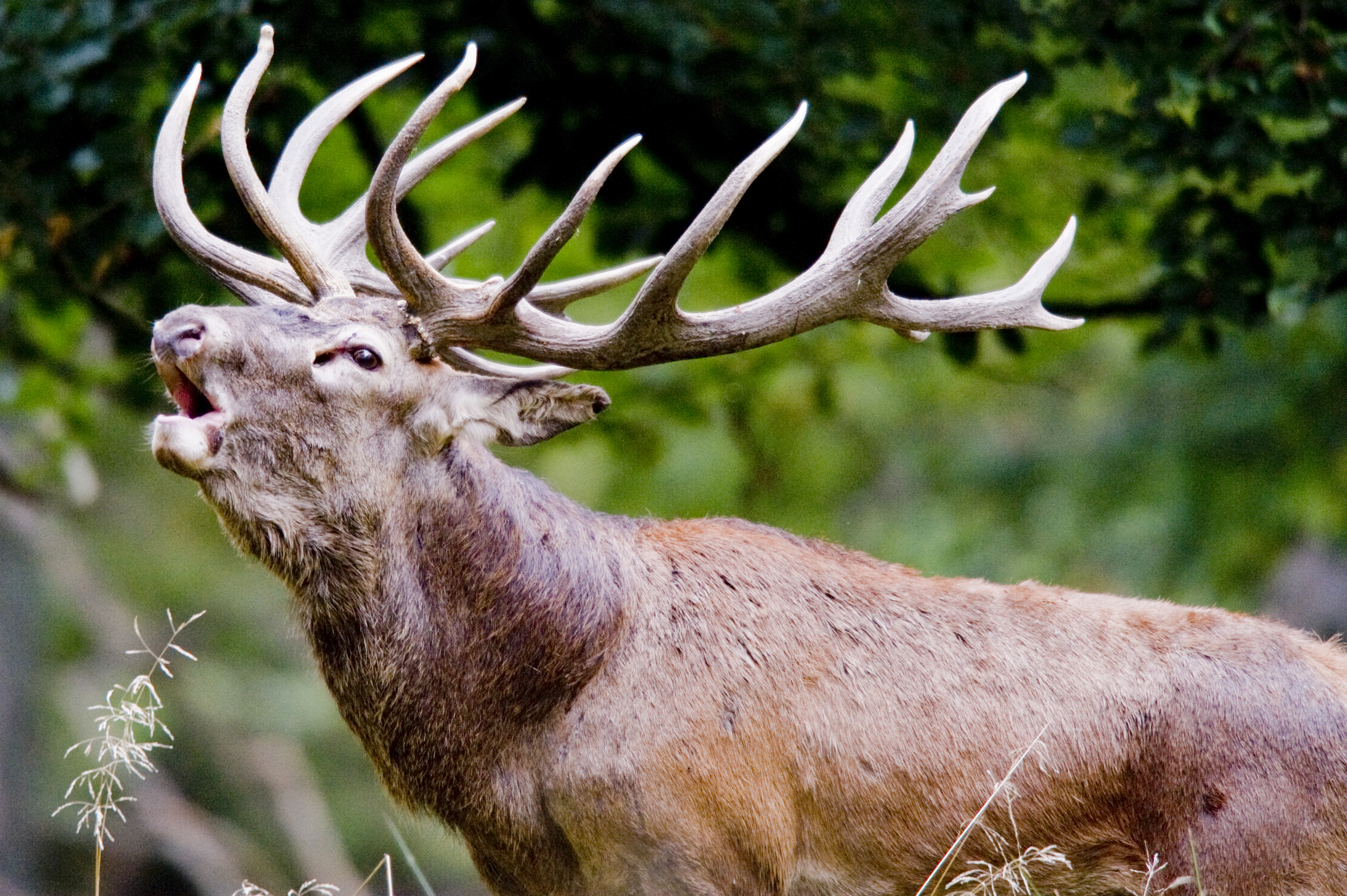
Red deer stag advertises its size honestly by roaring in the breeding season, reducing the need to fight.

Advertising in biology means the use of displays by organisms such as animals and plants to signal their presence for some evolutionary reason.

Such signalling may be honest, used to attract other organisms, as when flowers use bright colours, patterns, and scent to attract pollinators such as bees; or, again honestly, to warn off other organisms, as when distasteful animals use warning coloration to prevent attacks from potential predators. Such honest advertising benefits both the sender and the receiver.

Other organisms may advertise dishonestly; in Batesian mimicry, edible animals more or less accurately mimic distasteful animals to reduce their own risk of being attacked by predators.

== In plants ==
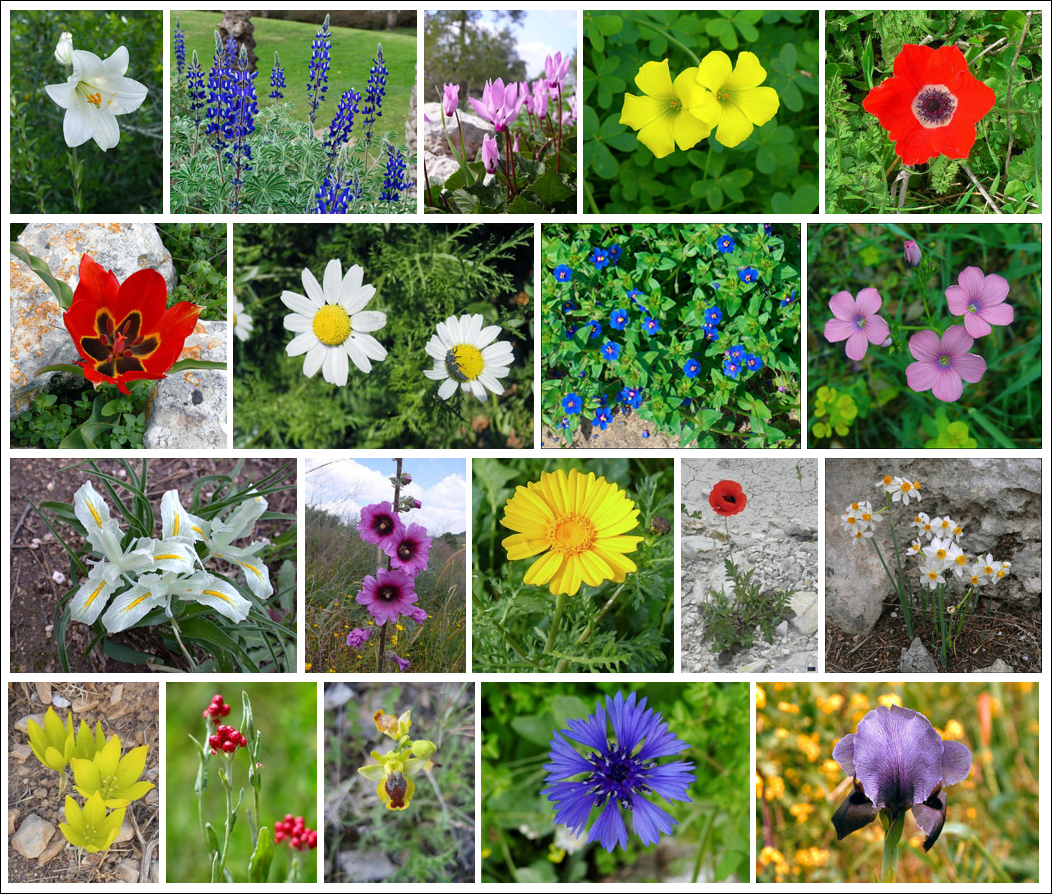
Insect-pollinated flowers use a combination of cues to advertise themselves to insects.

Insect-pollinated flowers use bright colours, patterns, rewards of nectar and pollen, and scent to attract pollinators such as bees. Some also use drugs such as caffeine to encourage bees to return more often. Advertising is influenced by sexual selection: in dioecious plants like sallow, the male flowers are brighter yellow (the colour of their pollen) and have more scent than female flowers. Honey bees are more attracted by the brighter male flowers, but not by their scent.

Many flowers that are adapted for pollination by birds produce copious quantities of nectar and advertise this with their red coloration. Insects see red less well than other colours, and the plant needs to devote its energy to attracting birds that can act as pollinators rather than insects that cannot. In fact, the Canary Island endemic Echium wildpretii has two subspecies, a red-flowering one on Teneriffe which is mainly pollinated by birds, and a pink-flowered one on Las Palmas which is pollinated by insects.

== In animals ==
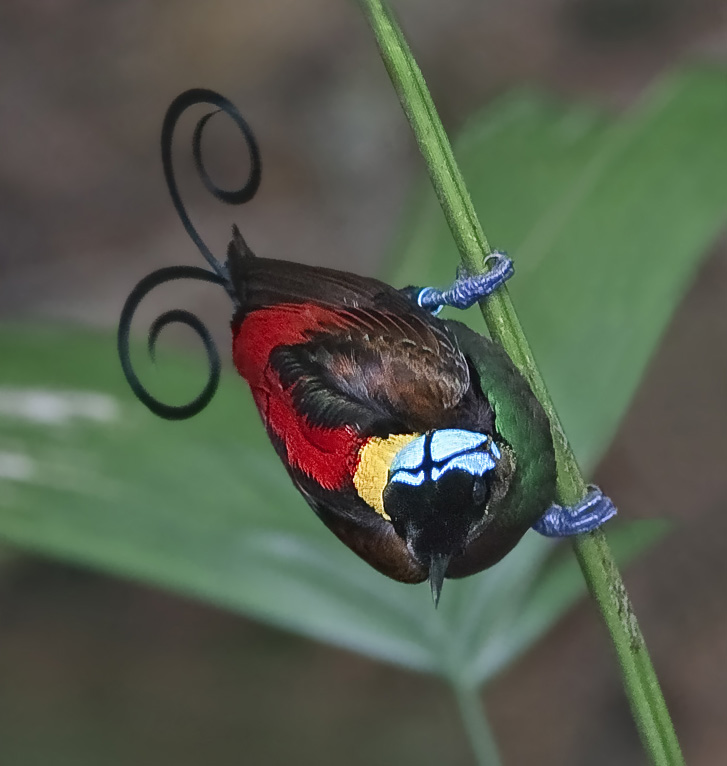
Wilson's bird-of-paradise advertises to females in the breeding season with brilliant colours, patterns and tail plumes, as well as display behaviour and song.

Advertising takes a variety of forms in animals. Breeding adults often display to attract a mate. Breeding males of sexually dimorphic birds, such as peacocks, birds of paradise and bower birds, have elaborate plumage, song, and behaviour. These evolved through sexual selection by females. The males use these features alone or in combination to advertise their presence, and, especially but not only in species with lek mating, to compete with rival males. In a lek, the presence of multiple males advertises and potentially benefits all the males present, so they are both collaborating and competing.

Breeding males may also advertise honestly to warn rival males of their strength, a classic example being the red deer, where the roaring of a rutting stag reliably signals its size. The honest advertisement benefits both sender and receiver, as neither need become involved in a costly fight to assess their relative strength. In the breeding season, frogs congregate at suitable breeding sites and call to advertise their presence, particularly at night. Females can distinguish between the fitness of males based on the characteristics of their voices. Desert toads emerge from their burrows in response to heavy rain. Males emerge first and when one finds a suitable ephemeral pool, its call attracts others and they all congregate there. Males may call in unison in noisy choruses, and breeding is explosive, a mass of males competing for the smaller number of females.

Colour can be used in advertising. Some butterflies have eyespots on their wings. These make no effort at concealment, but may startle a potential predator into trying elsewhere. The western skink has a distinctive blue tail. If the skink cannot escape from a predator by concealment or flight, it can afford to lose its tail in order to escape with its life. Similarly, some species of grasshopper are well-camouflaged when at rest but flash vivid colouration when flying. The grasshopper thus avoids being eaten while the potential predator hunts in vain for the brightly coloured insect it saw.

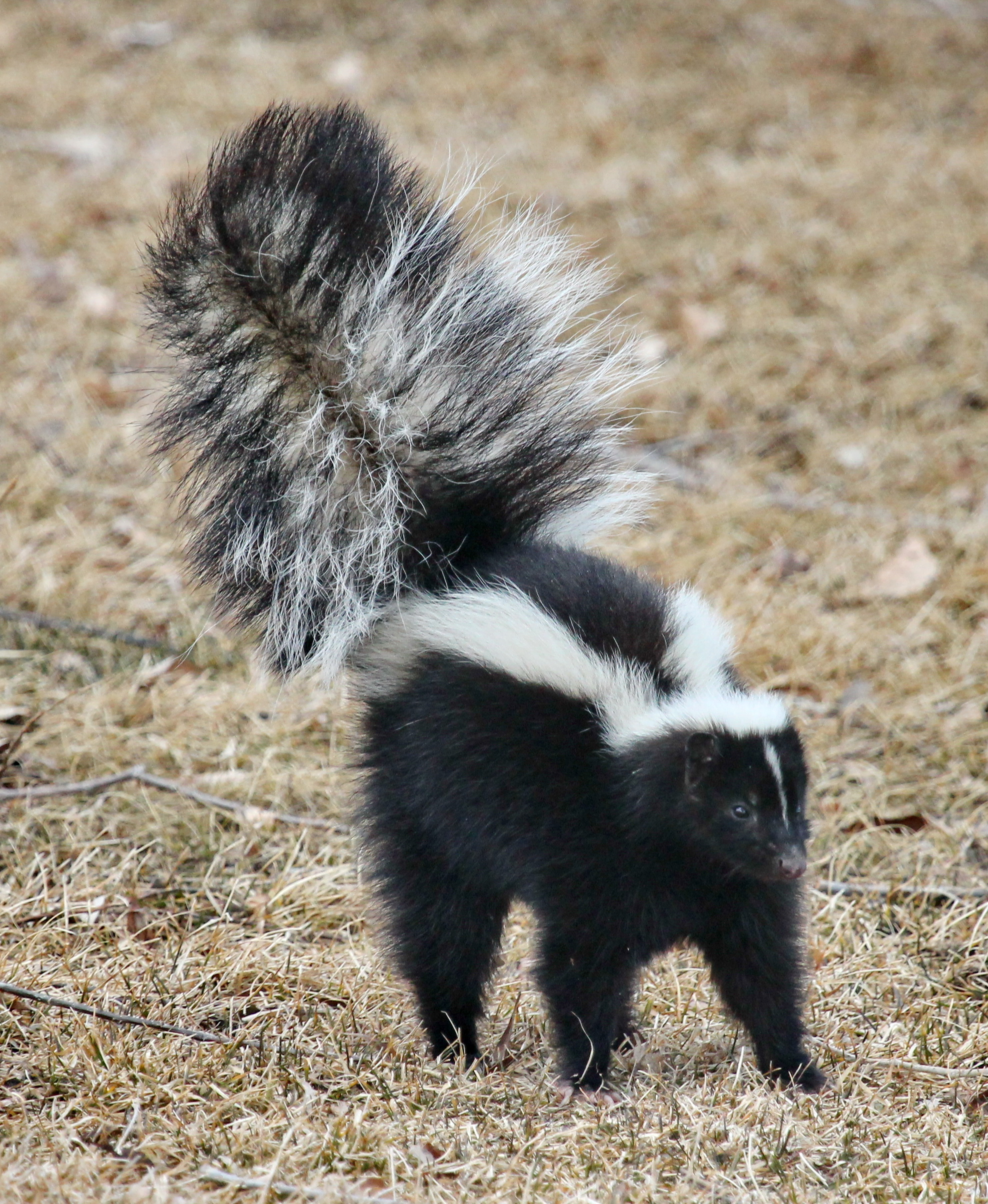
Skunk, Mephitis mephitis, advertising its powerful defences by raising its tail and displaying its aposematic coloration

Male crickets chirp to attract females, and in some species, their calls can be heard from great distances. However, a certain parasitic fly has taken advantage of this, the female is attracted to a calling male cricket on which it then deposits its developing larvae. Elaborate song is especially well-developed among birds, and again sexual selection has driven its evolution. Songbirds such as warblers have an extensive repertoire of songs, sometimes with thousands of phrases. The sedge warbler assembles an effectively infinite number of songs by assembling phrases in combination. Laboratory experiments by Clive Catchpole demonstrate that female sedge warblers select males with more varied songs, while field observation indicates that such males attract mates before other males.

Breeding females may advertise oestrus (being "on heat" or "in season", i.e. that they are fertile, ovulating and receptive to breeding) with pheromones (scent), courtship behaviour, and visual signals. Human females have long been thought to conceal their ovulation, but women's behaviour changes around the time of ovulation with increased sexual motivation, and they are more attracted to men at that time; conversely, men are more attracted to the scent of women around the time of ovulation than in the non-ovulating (luteal) phase of the menstrual cycle.

Distasteful animals use warning coloration (aposematism) to prevent attacks from potential predators.

Many animals wish to advertise to those of their own species while being camouflaged to avoid predation. Many deep sea fish do this by way of bioluminescence. Patterns of photophores on their undersides emit light that from below hide their silhouettes and resemble the scintillating lights produced by the ever-moving surface layers of water. At the same time, each species has a distinctive pattern of photophores that enables another member of its species to identify it as a con-specific.
