= Schrader Range =

Mountain range in Papua New Guinea

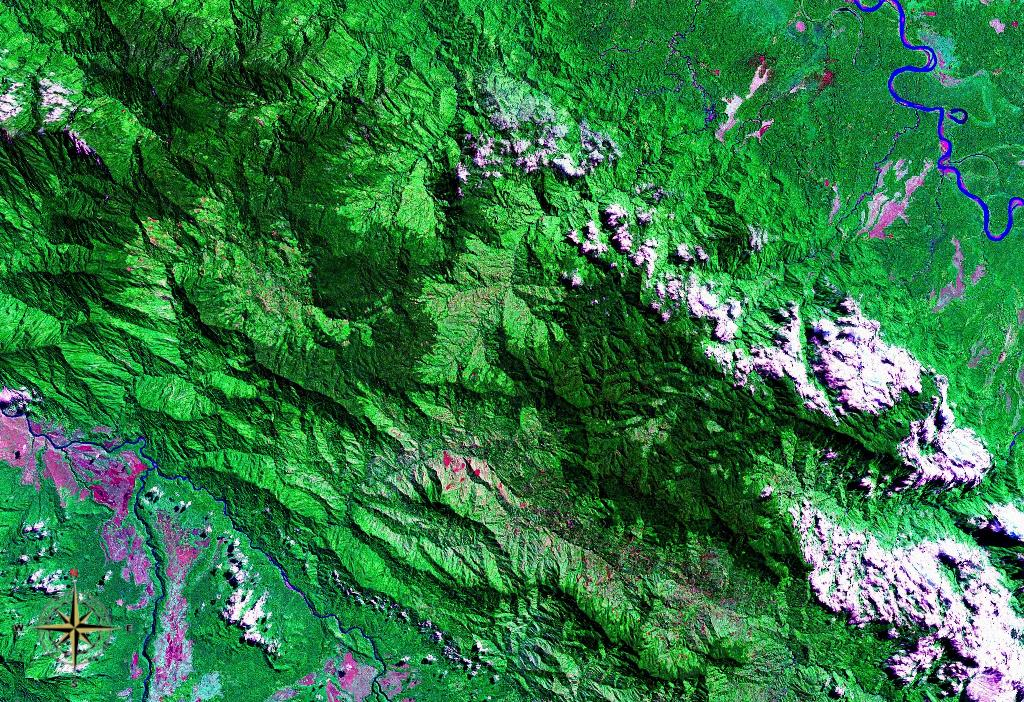
- Schrader Range seen from space (false colors).

Geography
- Location within Papua New Guinea
- State: Papua New Guinea
- Range coordinates: 5°09′S 144°27′E
- Parent range: Bismarck Range

Schrader Range is a mountain range in central Papua New Guinea. It is a part of the Bismarck Range.

== See also ==
- Schraeder Range languages
