= Wine red =

Dark shade of the color red

Wine / Wine red

Color coordinates
- Hex triplet: #800032
- sRGB^{B} (r, g, b): (128, 0, 50)
- HSV (h, s, v): (337°, 100%, 50%)
- CIELCh_{uv} (L, C, h): (26, 73, 1°)
- Source: ISCC-NBS
- ISCC–NBS descriptor: Deep reddish brown
- B: Normalized to [0–255] (byte)

The color wine, or wine red (compare West Frisian: wynread, Afrikaans: wynrooi, Italian: vino rosso, Swedish: vinröd, Finnish: viininpunainen, etc), also called bordeaux, vinous, or vinaceous, is a dark shade of red and brown. It is a representation of the typical color of red wine.

The first recorded use of wine as a color name in English was in 1705. The word bordeaux is also sometimes used to describe this color.

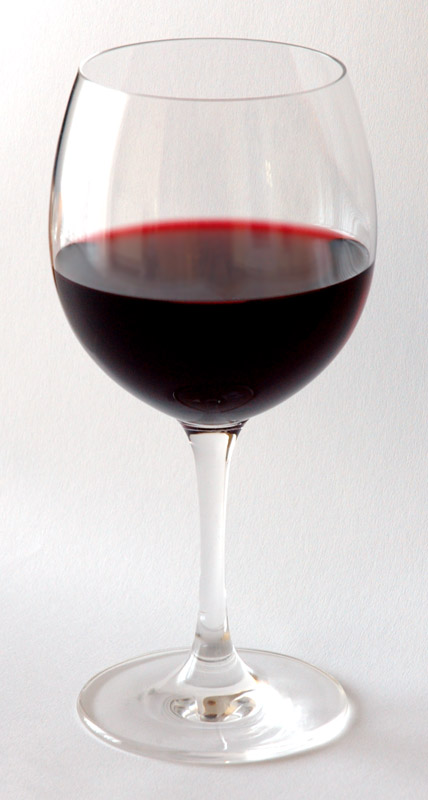
Red wine

== Variations of the color term ==
=== Claret ===
Claret

Color coordinates
- Hex triplet: #7F1734
- sRGB^{B} (r, g, b): (127, 23, 52)
- HSV (h, s, v): (343°, 82%, 50%)
- CIELCh_{uv} (L, C, h): (28, 66, 2°)
- Source: Xona.com Color List
- ISCC–NBS descriptor: Deep red
- B: Normalized to [0–255] (byte)

The color claret is displayed adjacent. Claret is a representation of the average color of Bordeaux wine.

Accordingly, another name for this color is Bordeaux. Bordeaux however is more widely used as a color name in European languages other than English, where claret has had longer history.

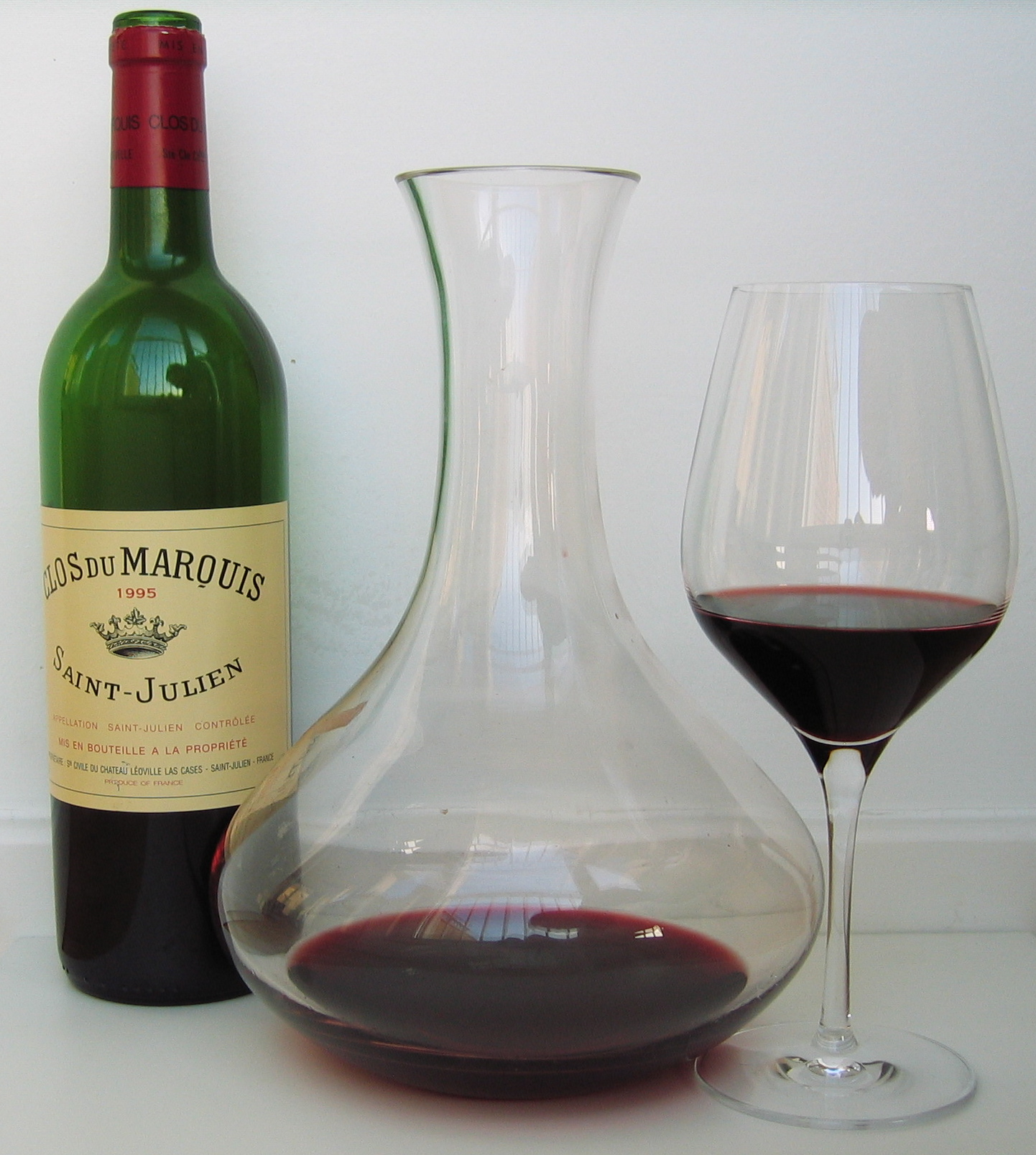
Bordeaux wine

The first recorded use of claret as a color name in English was in 1547.

=== Burgundy ===
Burgundy

Color coordinates
- Hex triplet: #800020
- sRGB^{B} (r, g, b): (128, 0, 32)
- HSV (h, s, v): (345°, 100%, 50%)
- CIELCh_{uv} (L, C, h): (26, 79, 7°)
- Source: /Maerz and Paul
- ISCC–NBS descriptor: Deep red
- B: Normalized to [0–255] (byte)

Burgundy is a red color associated with the Burgundy wine of the same name, which in turn is named after the Burgundy region of France.

The first recorded use of "burgundy" as a color name in English was in 1881.

=== Wine dregs ===
Wine Dregs

Color coordinates
- Hex triplet: #673147
- sRGB^{B} (r, g, b): (103, 49, 71)
- HSV (h, s, v): (336°, 52%, 40%)
- CIELCh_{uv} (L, C, h): (28, 32, 348°)
- Source: Maerz and Paul
- ISCC–NBS descriptor: Dark purplish red
- B: Normalized to [0–255] (byte)

Wine dregs, or dregs of wine, is a deep tone of the color wine. It refers to the color of the lees of wine which settle at the bottom of a wine vessel. The first recorded use of wine dregs as a color name in English was in 1924. This color and old gold are the official colors of the Phi Delta Chi and Delta Psi fraternities.

The normalized color coordinates for wine dregs are identical to old mauve, which was first recorded as a color name in English in 1925.

== Wine in human culture ==
Fashion

- The color wine is often used in fashion for various articles of clothing.

Sports

- Burgundy is the traditional color of the Venezuela national football team. The team's nickname is La Vinotinto, which roughly translates into "The Red Wine."
- Claret is a popular color for association football clubs; it is used by FC Barcelona, Aston Villa F.C., Fluminense F.C., West Ham United F.C., Burnley F.C., Northampton Town F.C., Bradford City A.F.C., Scunthorpe United F.C., and BFC Dynamo. Burgundy is being used by the Washington Commanders in the National Football League of gridiron football.
- Wine is the primary color of the National Basketball Association (NBA)'s Cleveland Cavaliers, along with gold and black.

Symbolism

As wine has been part of human culture for so long, colors such as burgundy and claret have come to symbolise many aspects of life including patience (as wine takes so long to make), community and celebration.

== See also ==
- List of colors
