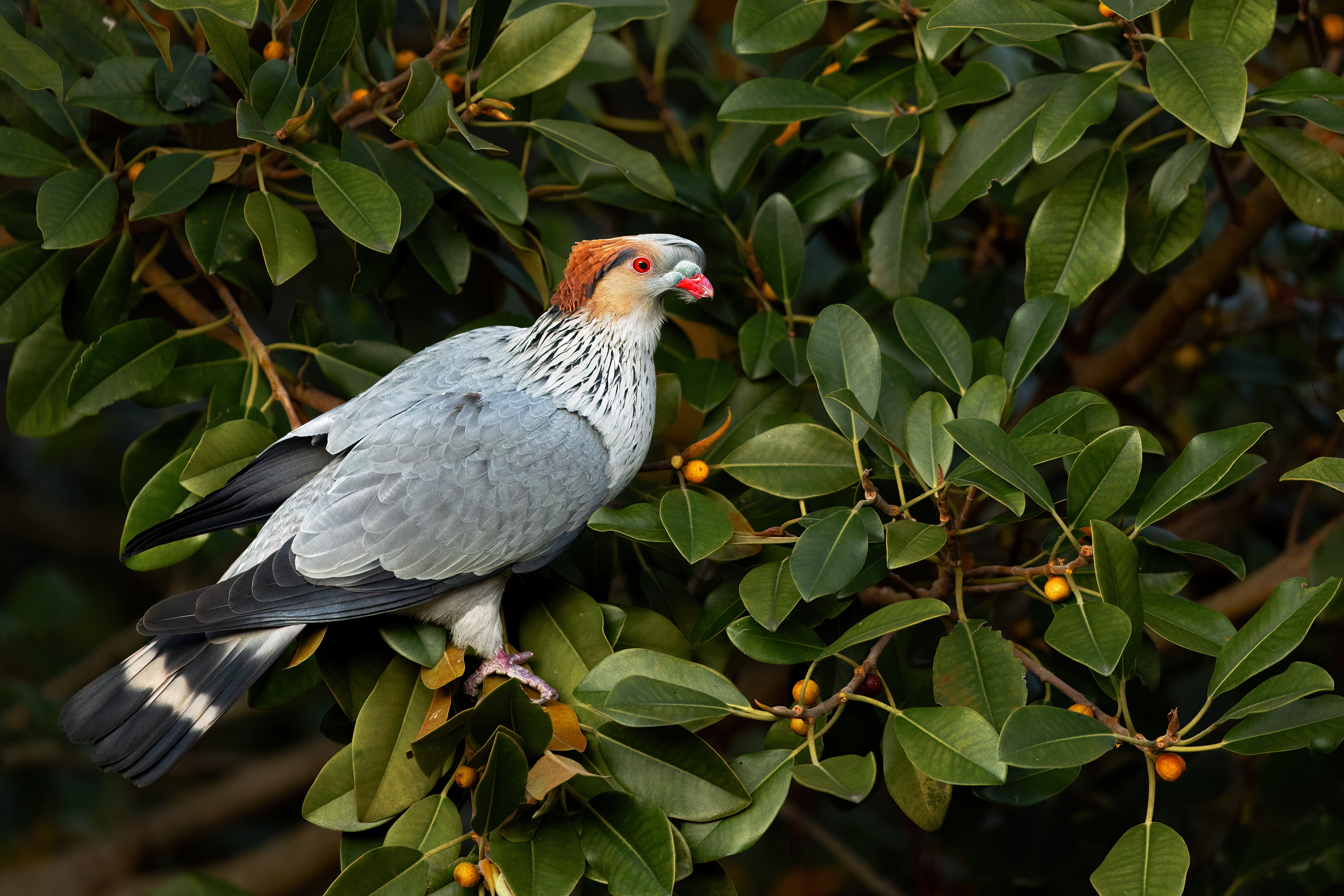

Conservation status
- Least Concern (IUCN 3.1)

Scientific classification
- Kingdom: Animalia
- Phylum: Chordata
- Class: Aves
- Order: Columbiformes
- Family: Columbidae
- Tribe: Ptilinopodini
- Genus: Lopholaimus; Gould, 1841
- Species: L. antarcticus

Binomial name
- Lopholaimus antarcticus (Shaw, 1793)

Synonyms
- Columba antarctica Shaw; Columba dilopha Temminck

= Topknot pigeon =

Species of bird

The topknot pigeon (Lopholaimus antarcticus) is a pigeon native to eastern Australia.

== Taxonomy ==
English naturalist George Shaw described the topknot pigeon as Columba antarctica in 1793.

The topknot pigeon is sister taxon to a lineage that gave rise to the mountain pigeons (Gymnophaps) of New Guinea, the common ancestor of both diverged from a lineage that gave rise to the kererū and Chatham pigeon.

"Topknot pigeon" has been designated the official common name by the International Ornithologists' Union (IOC); John Gould noted in 1848 that it had been given this name by the colonists of New South Wales. It is also known by the name of "flock pigeon".

== Description ==
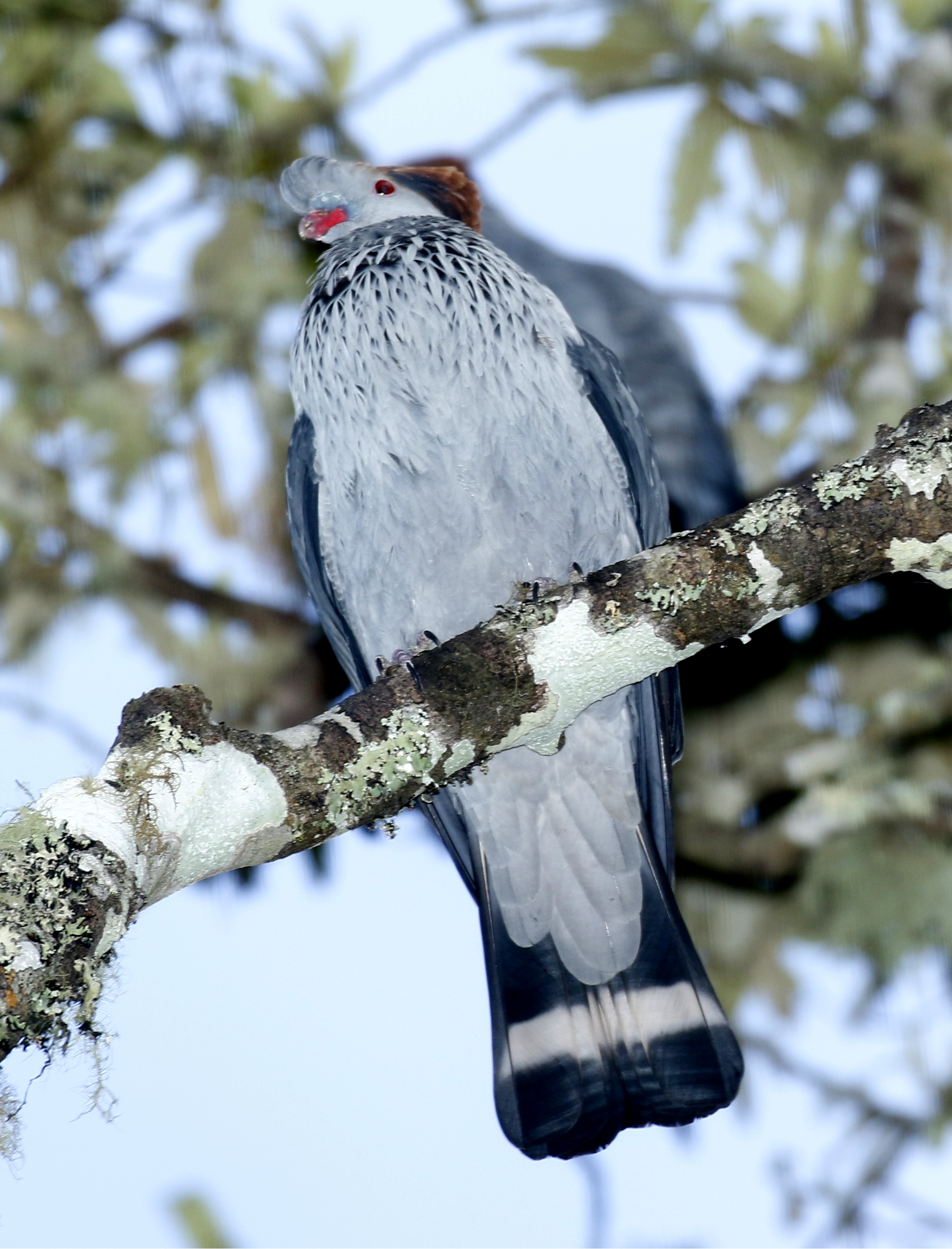
Lamington National Park, Australia

The topknot pigeon is a large predominately slate-grey bird, 40–46 centimetres (16–18 in) in length. The back, coverts and upper secondaries are a darker slate-grey with black quills. The primaries are black, the remaining body in a lighter slate-grey in colour. The chest and hind neck are notched, showing dark bases giving a streaked appearance.^{[2]} The tail is black crossed with a broad grey band. The crest is grey from the cere to the forehead, and russet brown on the crown with black sides. The mandibles are red with a brown tip, the protuberances at the base of the mandibles are bluish-green. The tarsals and feet are purplish red. The sexes are similar in description. However, Males have larger crest and lack some of the streaking on the chest. Juveniles are like females but the chest is mottled not streaked, the crest is smaller, with the cere and forehead being light brown, the crown grey. Tarsals and feet are reddish brown. The iris is yellow-golden with a bright red outer band. In fledglings the iris is brown.^{[2]}

== Calls ==
Three distinct calls have been described. The first, 'coo-oo, eee', might be related to nestlings. The second, 'coo-oo, ooo', is distinctly louder but still soft. The third, 'cor-or', is "a quiet, croaky, almost guttural utterance", not unlike the call of the domestic pigeon. During times of flocking and mass feeding, this pigeon has a short raucous call. This last call has been described as "a distant flying fox or domestic pig".

== Distribution and habitat ==
Found from the Cape York Peninsula in Queensland to the central south coast of New South Wales. These pigeons cover great distances in search of fruit bearing trees suddenly appearing in areas where they have not been seen for many years and will occasionally move beyond their normal southern range limit, into eastern Victoria.^{[2]} Historic records from 1953 show the topknot pigeon as an "accidental" species to Tasmania with a specimen taken at Spreyton near Devonport. This bird was one of a flock of 9-10 birds feeding on cherries. Previous to this sighting, the only other recording was in 1907 when two specimens were taken near St. Helens, east coast of Tasmania. The Spreyton specimen is held in the Tasmania Museum, Collection Number 13184/B2703.

== Diet ==
The topknot pigeon has a solely frugivorous diet which varies throughout its range as fruit ripen at different times during the year. This includes various species of Ficus and other rainforest fruit trees. Unlike some other species of Columbidae, the topknot pigeon does not use grit in its crop to break down the seeds of the fruit it consumes, and therefore the seeds are defecated intact. This results in seed dispersal not only under the fruiting trees the birds are feeding on but also under their roosting trees.

The breeding season can be directly related to the combined ripening of fruit trees and palms within the rainforest habitat. Forcing to birds to mass flock and congregated at these areas. Nests and eggs have been reported from June to December. Few nests have been observed in the wild. The nest has been described as sometimes flimsy but frequently substantial, built of stout sticks from turpentine and eucalyptus trees. A single ovate egg about 43 by 30 mm in size is laid. Incubation takes 17–24 days in captivity, and both sexes appear to share the incubation duties.

== Conservation ==
The species used to occur in enormous numbers in Australian rainforest, but the population declined because of forest clearance and shooting. Because of concern over the steep decline in their population, topknot pigeons now are a protected species in Australia. However the increasing prevalence of a new food source in the fruit of the 'weed' camphor laurel trees has seen a recent resurgence in their number. As populations appear to be fluctuating but large, the species is currently classified as Least concern by the IUCN.

== Gallery ==
Rush Creek, SE Queensland, Australia

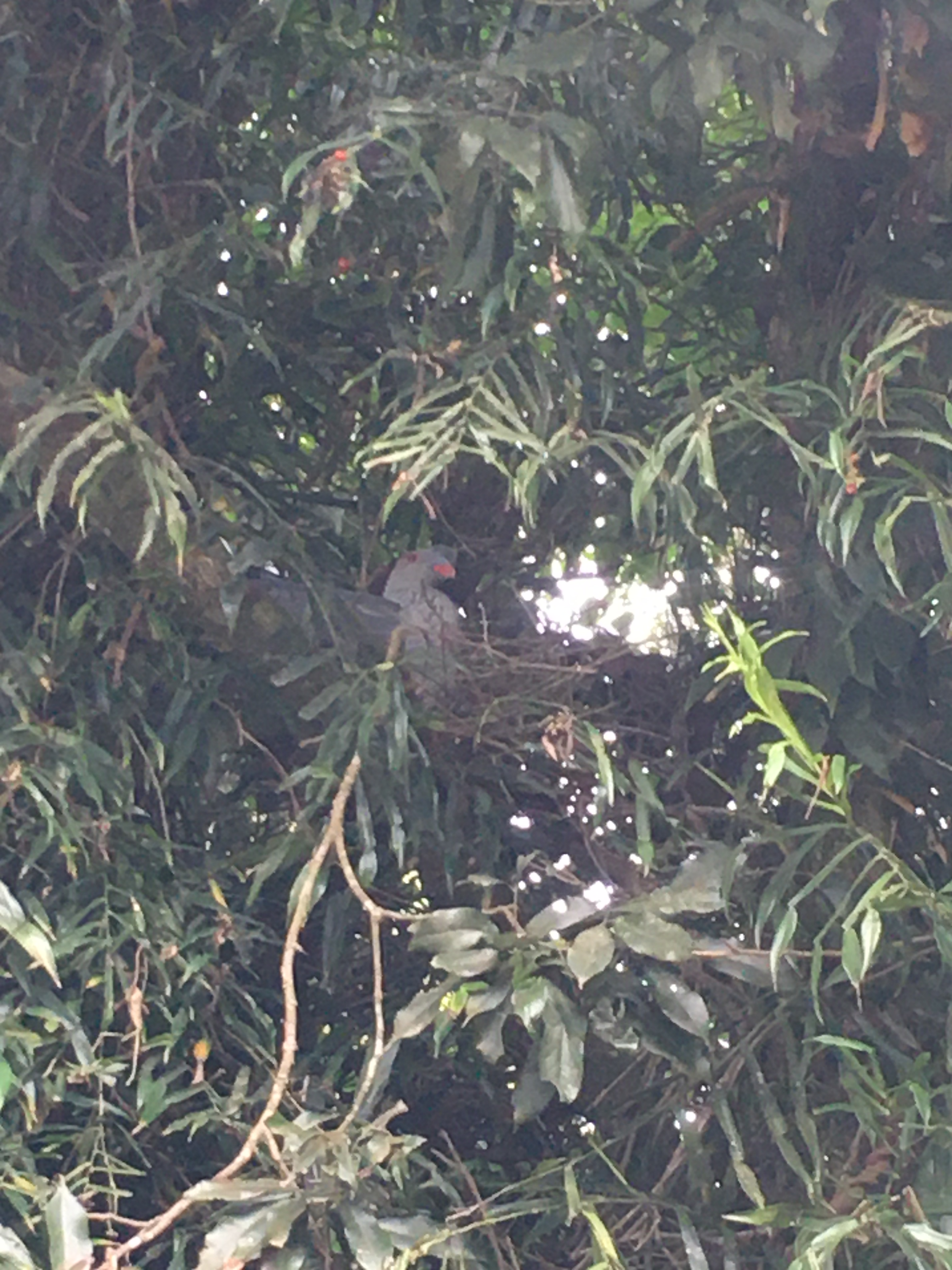
Nesting topknot pigeon. Mating pairs observed to share responsibility of nest, Maleny, Queensland.

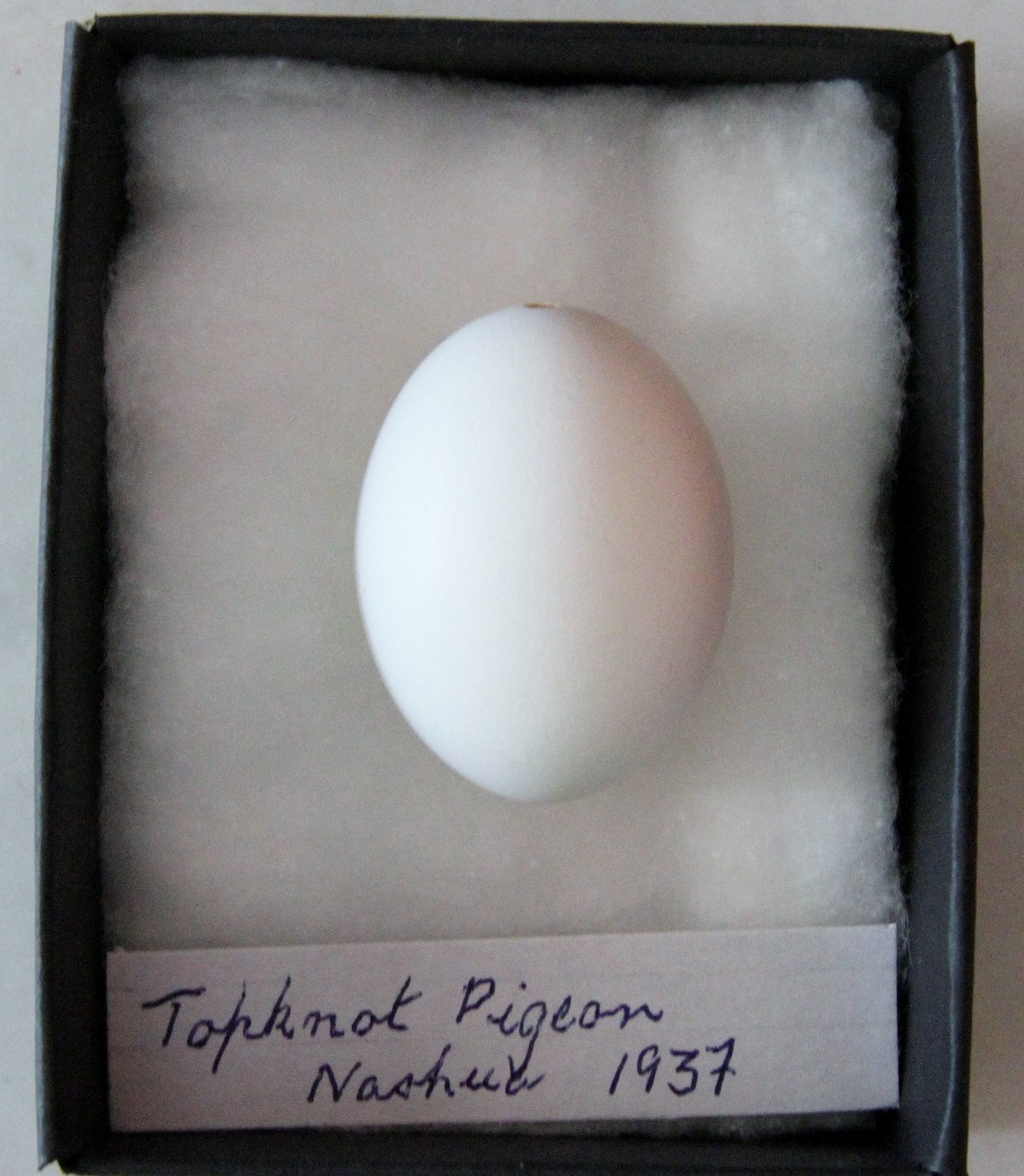
Topknot pigeon egg
