= Tuku =

Tuku may refer to:

== People ==
- Shamsul Hoque Tuku (born 1948), Bangladeshi politician
- Matiar Rahman Tuku, Bangladeshi politician
- Golam Sarwar Tuku, Bangladeshi politician
- Iqbal Hasan Mahmud Tuku, Bangladeshi politician
- Oliver Mtukudzi (1952–2019), Zimbabwean musician
- Tuku Morgan (born 1957), New Zealand politician

== Places ==
- Tuku, Yunlin, a township in Taiwan
- Tuku Nature Reserve, New Zealand
- Tuco (mountain), in Peru
- Tuku Wachanan

== Other uses ==
- Tuku dialect of the Sakata language
- Turku, a city in Finland, written as 土庫 for Chinese Mandarin in Taiwan
