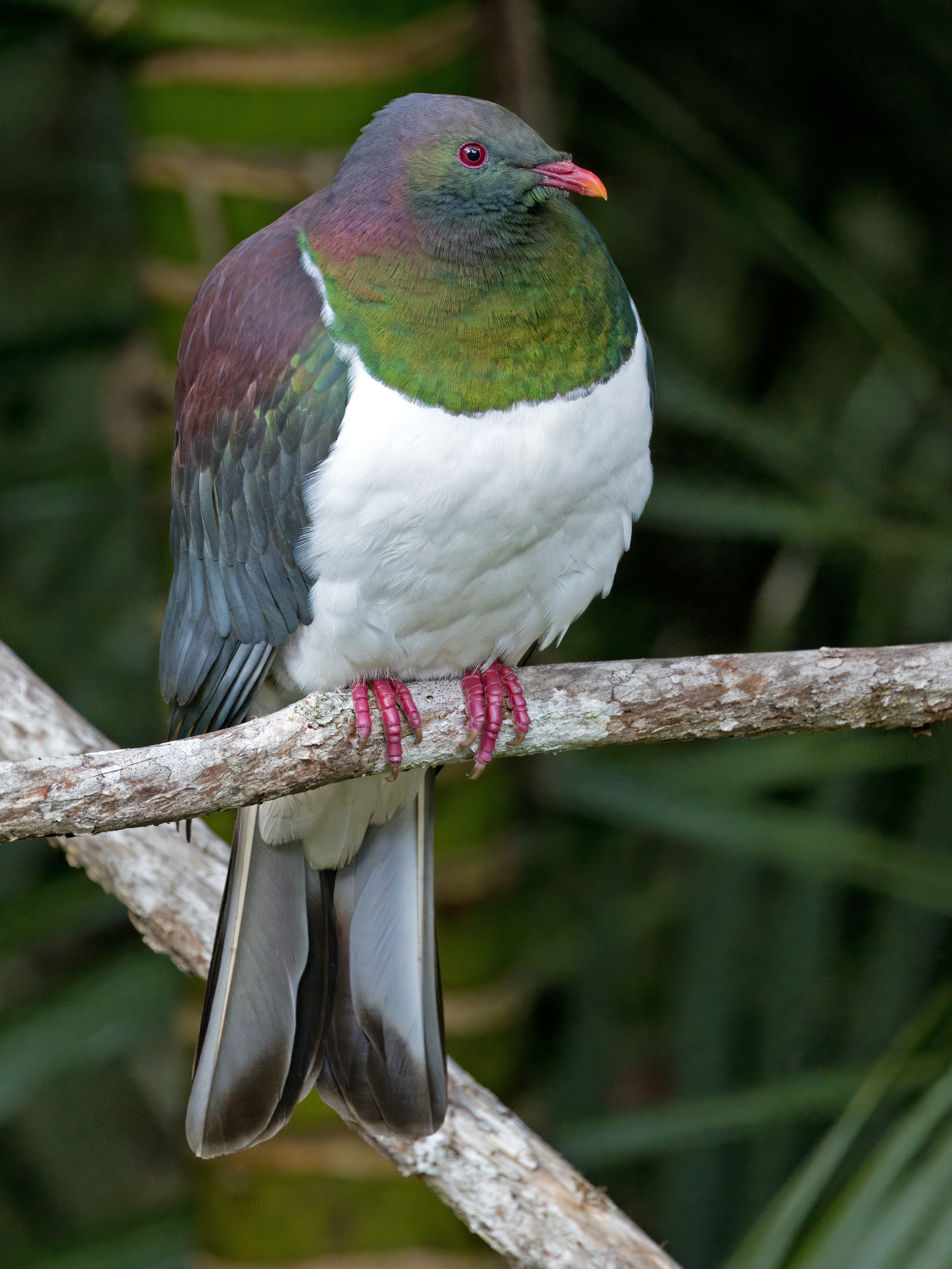
- In the Waitākere Ranges, New Zealand

Conservation status
- Least Concern (IUCN 3.1)

Scientific classification
- Kingdom: Animalia
- Phylum: Chordata
- Class: Aves
- Order: Columbiformes
- Family: Columbidae
- Genus: Hemiphaga
- Species: H. novaeseelandiae

Binomial name
- Hemiphaga novaeseelandiae (Gmelin, 1789)

Synonyms
- Columba novaeseelandiae Gmelin; Carpophaga novaeseelandiae (Gmelin)

Audio
- Recording of song and in-flight wingbeats

= Kererū =

Species of pigeon native to New Zealand

The kererū (Hemiphaga novaeseelandiae), also known as kūkupa (northern Māori dialects), New Zealand pigeon or wood pigeon, is a species of pigeon native to New Zealand. Johann Friedrich Gmelin described the bird in 1789 as a large, conspicuous pigeon up to 50 cm (20 in) in length and 550–850 g (19–30 oz) in weight, with a white breast and iridescent green–blue plumage. Two subspecies have been recognised; the second—the Norfolk pigeon of Norfolk Island—became extinct in the early 20th century. Kererū pairs are monogamous, breeding over successive seasons and remaining together when not breeding. They construct nests with twigs in trees, with a single egg clutch.

Found in a variety of habitats across the country, the kererū feeds mainly on fruits, as well as leaves, buds and flowers. Although widespread in both forest and urban habitats, its numbers have declined significantly since European colonisation and the arrival of invasive mammals, such as rats, stoats and possums. However, the results of nationwide bird surveys indicate that there has been a significant recovery in the population in suburban areas. As of 2022, the IUCN Red List classifies the species as least concern, while the Department of Conservation (DOC) classifies the kererū as "not threatened" but conservation dependent.

Considered a taonga (cultural treasure) to the Māori people, the kererū was historically a major food source in Māori culture. However, due to the decline in its population, hunting is illegal. Customary use of kererū is restricted to the use of feathers and bones obtained from dead birds collected by DOC. This issue has received significant public and political attention, as some people argue that bans on kererū hunting are detrimental to Māori traditions. In 2018, the kererū was designated Bird of the Year by the New Zealand organisation Forest & Bird, and in 2019, the exoplanet HD 137388 b was renamed Kererū in its honour.

== Taxonomy and nomenclature ==
=== History and binomials ===
English ornithologist John Latham wrote about the kererū in his A General Synopsis of Birds in 1783 but did not give it a scientific name. German naturalist Johann Friedrich Gmelin gave it its first formal description in 1789, placing it in genus Columba as C. novaeseelandiae, with Latham naming it Columba zealandica in his 1790 Index Ornithologicus. The genus Hemiphaga was introduced by the French naturalist Charles Lucien Bonaparte in 1854 with the kererū (Hemiphaga novaeseelandiae) as the type species for that genus. The name combines the Ancient Greek hēmi meaning "half", with the end of the genus name Carpophaga, "fruit eating", as Bonaparte saw the genus as related to both that genus and Megaloprepia (now incorporated into Ptilinopus).

=== Subspecies ===
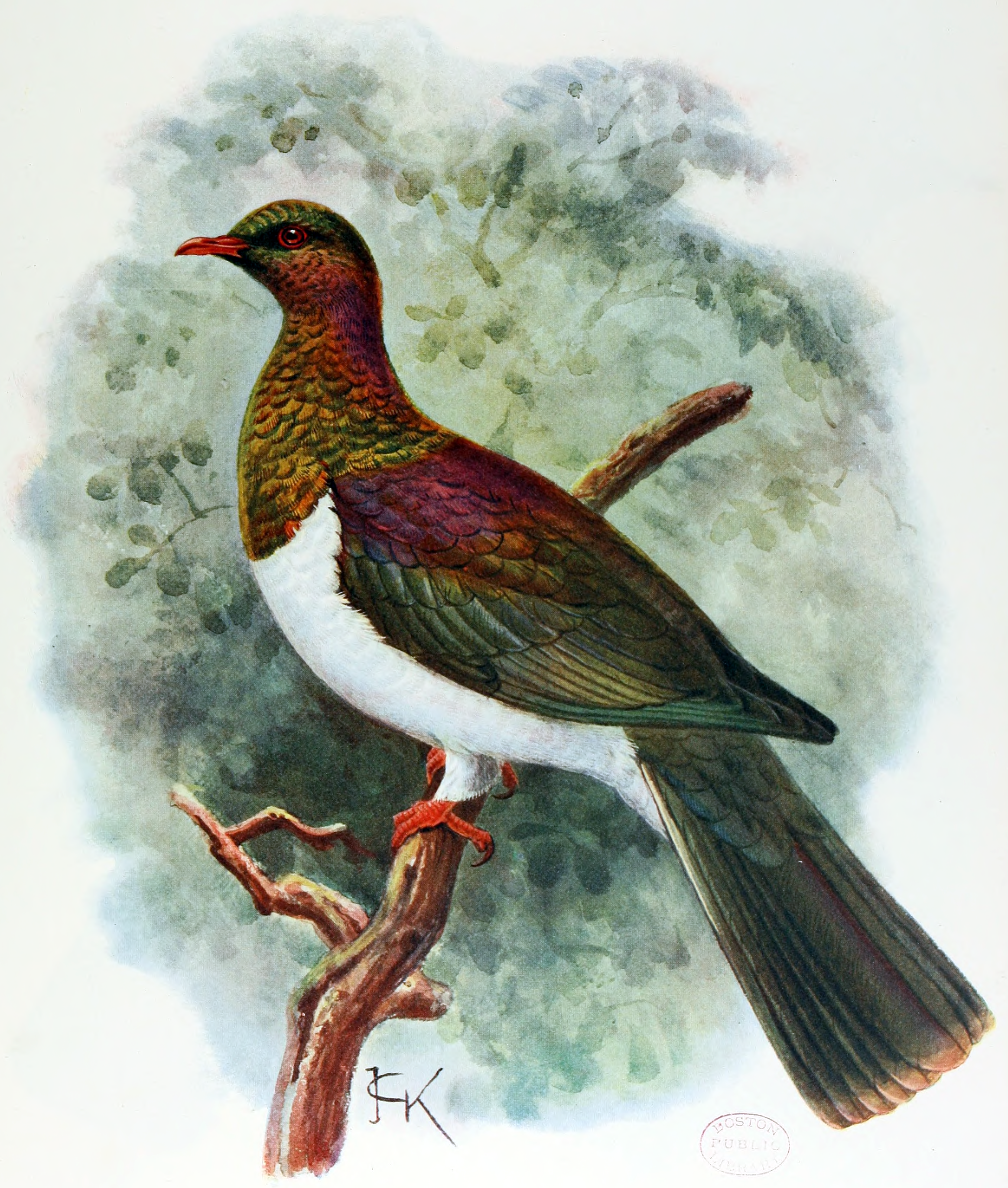
The extinct Norfolk pigeon (H. n. spadicea), lithograph by John Gerrard Keulemans (1907), based on a preserved specimen in the Natural History Museum at Tring

Two subspecies are recognised: H. n. novaseelandiae, which is found throughout New Zealand, and the little-studied Norfolk pigeon (H. n. spadicea) of Norfolk Island, now extinct. The subspecies differed in their plumage colour and shape. In 2001, it was proposed that a third subspecies—H. n. chathamensis or the Chatham Islands pigeon—should be raised to full species status as H. chathamensis on the basis of its distinct plumage, larger size and differing bone structure. This has since been widely accepted. Analysis of mitochondrial DNA confirmed the kererū and Norfolk pigeons to be more closely related to each other than to the Chatham pigeon, and that dispersal between the three landmasses most likely occurred during the Pleistocene Epoch.

=== Classification ===
The kererū belongs to the family Columbidae, and the subfamily Ptilinopinae, which is found throughout Southeast Asia, Malaya, Australia and New Zealand. The members of this subfamily feed largely on fruits, mainly stone fruit. Within the subfamily, the kererū and Chatham Islands pigeon are in a clade with a lineage that has given rise to the topknot pigeon (Lopholaimus antarcticus) of Australia and the mountain pigeons (Gymnophaps) of New Guinea, as shown in the cladogram below.

- - - kererū (Hemiphaga novaeseelandiae)
    - Chatham Islands pigeon (Hemiphaga chathamensis)
  - - topknot pigeon (Lopholaimus antarcticus)
    - Papuan mountain pigeon (Gymnophaps albertisii)

=== Common names ===
"New Zealand pigeon" has been designated the official common name of the kererū by the International Ornithologists' Union (IOU). The word kererū (which is both singular and plural) is the most common Māori name, and a variety of mainstream sources now use the name kererū for the species. Spelling Māori loanwords with macrons—that indicate a long vowel—is now common in New Zealand English where technically possible. It is also known as kūkupa and kūkū in some parts of North Island, particularly in Northland, and Latham had reported the name "Hagarrèroo" in 1783. Kererū have also been called "wood pigeons".

== Description ==
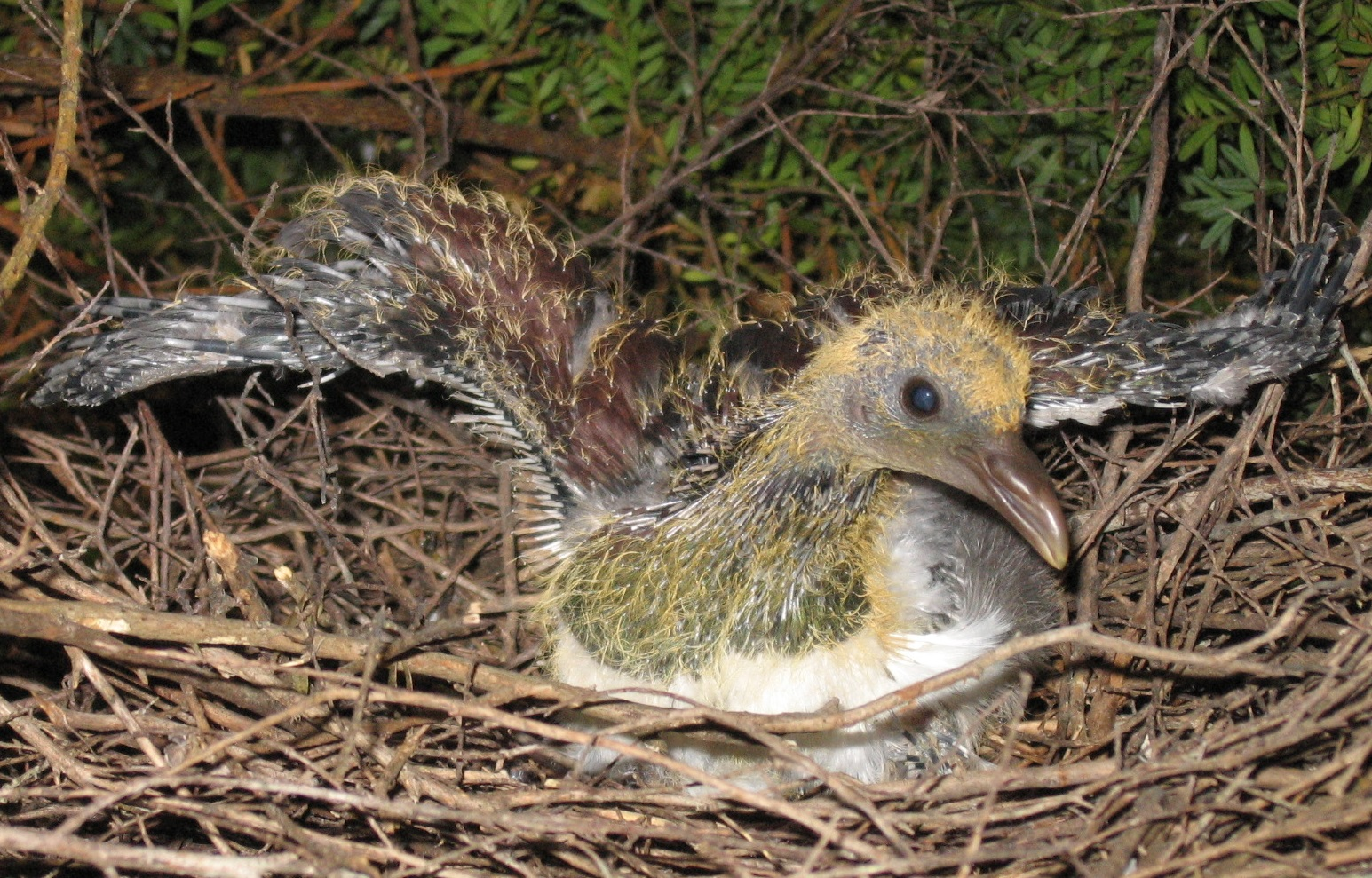
A kererū chick in the nest

The kererū is a large arboreal pigeon weighing 550–850 g (19–30 oz), and is up to 50 cm (20 in) in length, with a wingspan of around 75 cm (30 in). Its appearance is that of a typical pigeon, in that it has a relatively small head, a straight soft-based bill and loosely attached feathers. The sexes have similar plumage. The head, neck and upper breast are dark green with a gold-bronze highlights, while the nape, upper back and secondary coverts are a copper-sheened purple, lightening to a more grey-green on the lower back, rump and the rest of upper surface of the wings. The tail is dark brown with green highlights and a pale edge. The breast is white, and sharply demarcated from the darker parts of its plumage. The undertail and underwing coverts are mainly pale grey. The bill is red with an orange tip, the feet dark red, and eyes are red with a pink orbital ring. Juveniles have a similar colouration but are generally paler with dull colours for the beak, eyes and feet and a shorter tail. The extinct Norfolk Island subspecies had a chestnut mantle, more grey outer wings and rump, a dark purple tail and white under wing and undertail coverts.

Kererū make occasional soft coo sounds, and their wings make a characteristic "whoosh" during flight. The bird's flight is also distinctive; birds will often ascend slowly before making steep parabolic dives.

== Environment and distribution ==
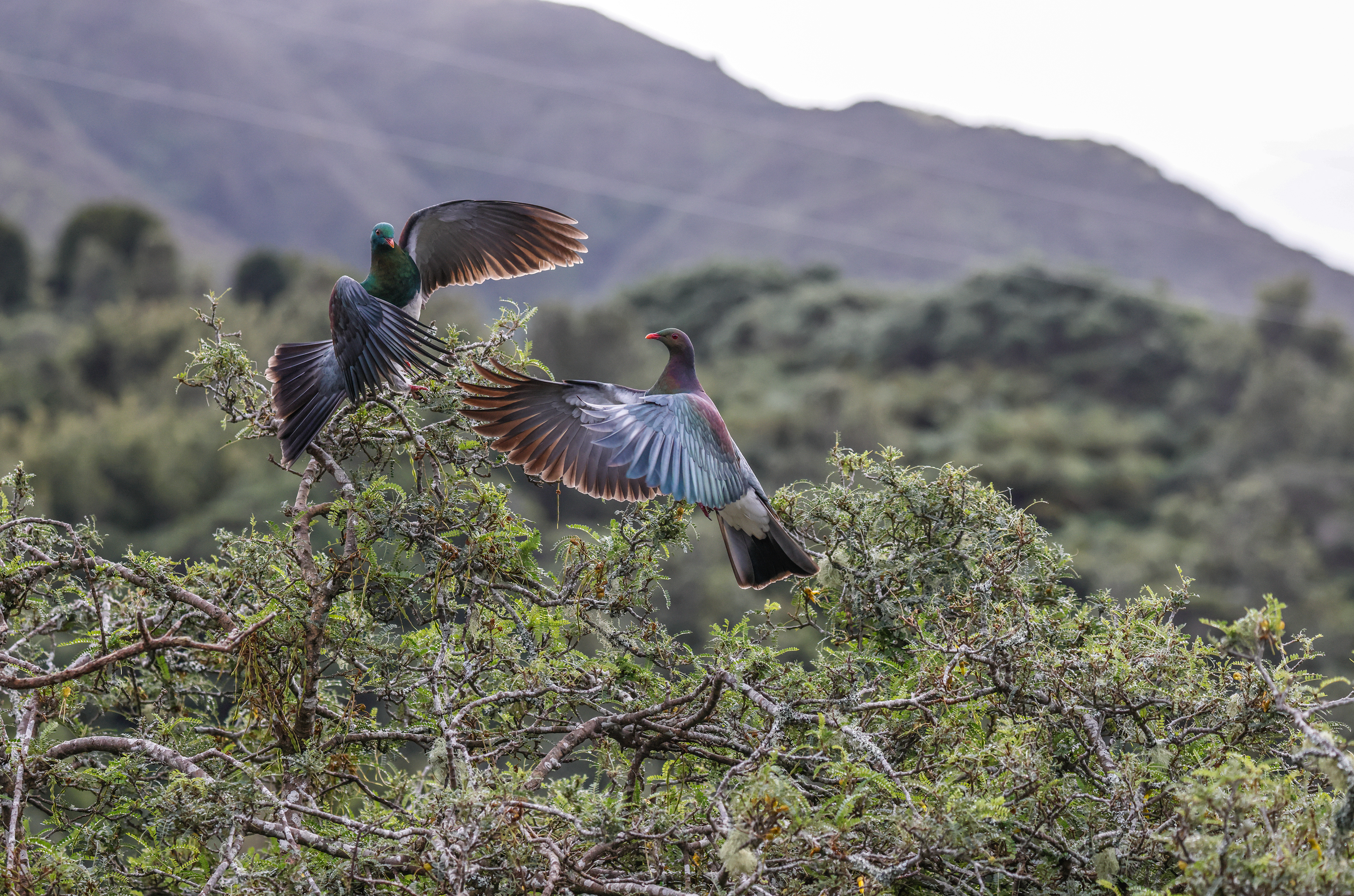
A territorial dispute between kererū

Usually they are found from Northland to Stewart Island and offshore islands, the kererū was historically abundant throughout the country. Its lack of genetic diversity suggests the species retreated to forest refugia during periods of Quaternary glaciation and rapidly spread across the country again when the climate grew warmer. Kererū bones have been recovered from Raoul Island in the Kermadecs, confirming the species once inhabited the island, though it was made locally extinct through hunting and cat predation in the late 1800s. They can be found in a variety of habitats including in native lowland forest, scrub, the countryside, and city gardens and parks.

The kererū lives in habitats ranging in altitude from coastal to montane. However their numbers declined significantly after European colonisation. This was due mainly to a decrease in habitat, introduced predators and hunting. Currently, whether kererū are present at a particular location within New Zealand is dependent on numerous factors such as forest cover, forest type and density of predators. Although sedentary, kererū can move considerable distances within their range; most fieldwork showed them moving up to 25 km (16 mi), generally looking for food. A 2011 study in Southland revealed that three of four kererū tagged around Invercargill crossed the Foveaux Strait to Stewart Island, and travelled up to 100 km (62 mi).

== Feeding ==
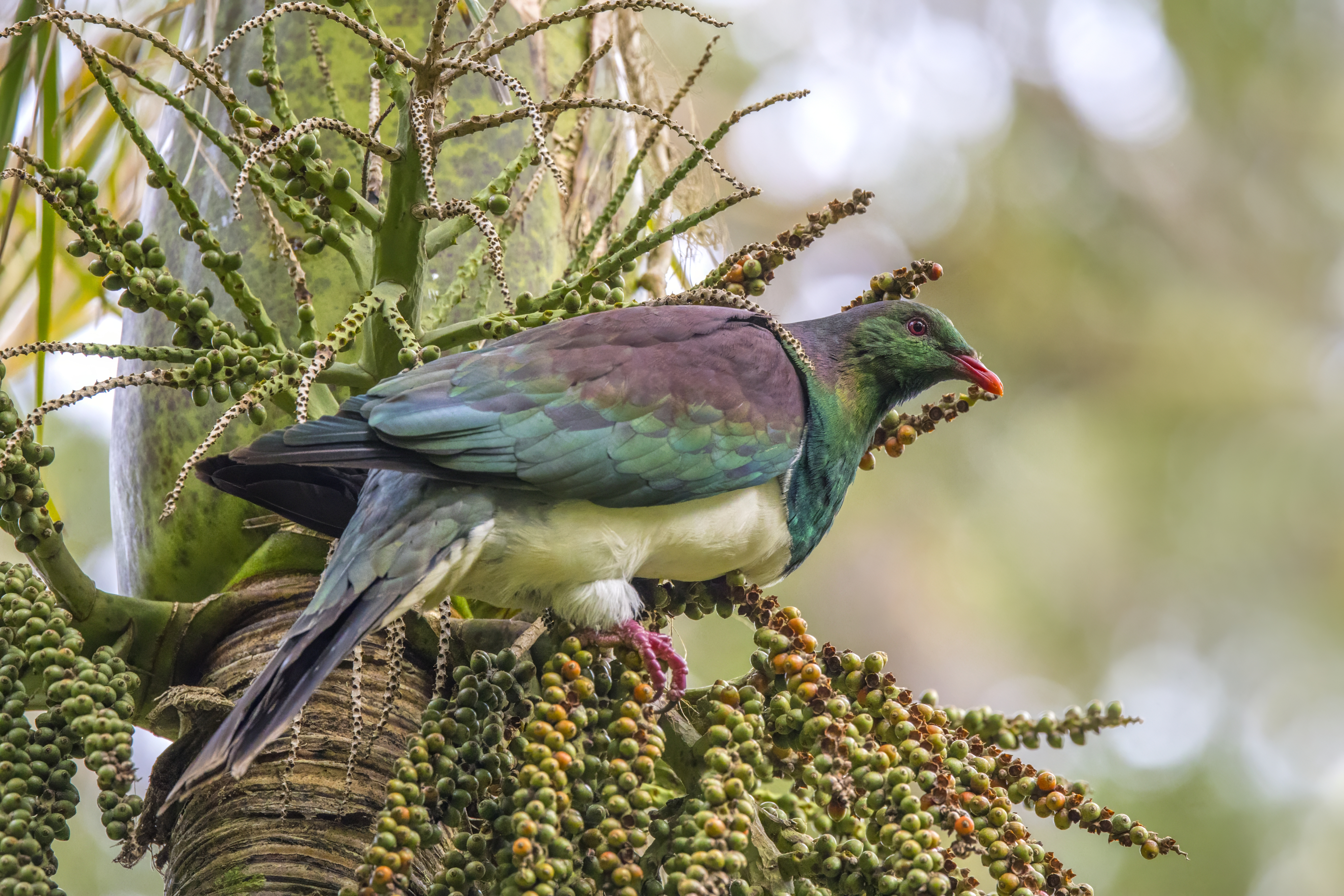
Kererū on nīkau (Rhopalostylis sapida), Waitākere Ranges

The kererū is primarily frugivorous, preferring fruit from native trees, but also eating leaves, flowers and buds. The kererū feeds on many species with tropical affinities, including the Lauraceae and Arecaceae, which abound in the essentially subtropical forests of northern New Zealand. They also feed on podocarp species such as miro (Pectinopitys ferruginea) and kahikatea (Dacrycarpus dacrydioides). Other fruit sought after by kererū include those of tawa (Beilschmiedia tawa), taraire (Beilschmiedia tarairi), pūriri (Vitex lucens), pigeonwood (Hedycarya arborea), as well as tītoki (Alectryon excelsus), nīkau (Rhopalostylis sapida), karaka (Corynocarpus laevigatus), Coprosma, and introduced species such as elder (Sambucus nigra), privet (Ligustrum species) and plums. Because of its diverse diet and widespread distribution, the kererū plays an important ecological role, and is vital to the health of podocarp-broadleaf forest.

While fruit comprises the major part of its diet, the kererū also browses on leaves and buds from a wide variety of both native and exotic species, especially nitrogen-rich foliage during breeding. Its diet changes seasonally as the availability of fruit changes, and leaves can comprise most of its diet at certain times of the year. Preferred leaves include kōwhai, tree lucerne, willow, elm, and poplar.

After eating, kererū often sun themselves while digesting their food. This behaviour can lead to the fruit fermenting in the bird's crop, particularly during warm summer weather, producing alcohol that causes the bird to become intoxicated. The kererū displays typical pigeon behaviour, including drinking by suction (unlike many birds which drink by raising their heads, using the assistance of gravity). Kererū also feed crop milk to hatchlings.

== Breeding and lifespan ==
Kererū courtship display (24 s)

The kererū is monogamous; pairs are thought to reproduce together over multiple seasons, and remain together when not breeding. Breeding generally depends on the availability of ripe fruit, which varies seasonally, annually, and by location. In the warmer Northland region, kererū are able to raise young year round, provided enough fruit is available. They do not breed when moulting, which tends to take place between March and May. Further south, fewer subtropical tree species grow, and in these areas breeding usually occurs between October (early spring) and April (late summer/early autumn), again depending on fruit availability. During the breeding season the male kererū performs display flights, where it ascends steeply and appears to stall at the top of the flight, before a steep swooping descent. The courtship display includes the male turning around on a perch adjacent to a female, placing the tip of the bill into a wing, and stretching out his neck while bowing his head. He then bounces up and down with his bill resting on his chest, and proceeds to mate with her if she is receptive, which she indicates by lowering her body so he can mount her.

The kererū nests in the canopy of trees, bushes, shrubs, or hedges, anywhere from 1.8 to 9.1 m (5.9 to 29.9 ft) above the ground. Both birds construct the unlined platform of twigs—mostly kānuka (Kunzea ericoides), which can be up to 30 cm (12 in) across. The clutch consists of a single oval white egg, which is 49 mm long by 34 mm wide. It is incubated for 28–29 days, with the male and female taking turns to incubate in shifts of around six hours. Fieldwork in Motatau Forest in Northland found that both parents then brooded the chick for 9–13 days, followed by the female alone. After 13–27 days, parents fed the chick without brooding. Weight gain is rapid in the first 8 days, while feathers appear between 5th and 8th days. The young bird fledges after 30–45 days. A pair may begin building a second nest before their chick in the first nest fledges. In seasons of plentiful fruit the kererū can successfully nest up to four times. Kererū have a lifespan of 15 to 25 years; in 2020, a 29-year-old bird nicknamed "Pidge" turned up in Rotorua after not being seen for 24 years.

== Conservation ==
Traffic sign in New Zealand cautioning drivers of nearby kererū

Kererū were numerous until the 1960s, but they have since come under threat from introduced mammalian species, hunting, habitat degradation, and poor reproductive success. The introduced Australian common brushtail possum (Trichosurus vulpecula) and introduced species of rats—mainly the black rat (Rattus rattus), but also the Polynesian rat (R. exulans) and brown rat (R. norvegicus)—have played a role in reducing the population of kererū. Both possums and rats significantly reduce the amount of fruit available for kererū, and they also prey on kererū eggs and nestlings; cats and stoats kill adults as well as young. On Norfolk Island, the local subspecies was last seen in 1900; direct hunting by people was probably the main cause of extinction.

The Wild Birds Protection Act 1864 established hunting season for the species from April to July. With kererū populations declining across the country, harvests became increasingly restricted by the government. This culminated in the Animals Protection and Game Act 1921–1922, which designated the kererū as an absolutely protected species, although the enforcement against hunting was not consistent. This act was repealed and replaced by the Wildlife Act 1953, which reaffirmed the status of kererū as a protected species and outlawed any taking of the birds. Prosecutions have been taken enforcing this law. Māori have protested at each of these law changes, claiming a traditional right to hunt the pigeon.

Kererū are also vulnerable to injury or death as a result of collisions with vehicles. A large number of kererū fatalities have been reported alongside State Highway 2 in Wellington, as a result of low-flying birds being struck by vehicles as they fly across the motorway to feed on the flowers of tree lucerne. Kererū can also be injured or killed following collisions with the windows of buildings. In 2021, the Urban Wildlife Trust commenced a campaign to help protect kererū and other birds from colliding with the large glazed areas surrounding the upper terminal building of the Wellington Cable Car, adjacent to Wellington Botanic Gardens. The proposed solution was the installation of a grid of dots permanently fixed to approximately 150 m^{2} (1,600 ft^{2}) of glass.

As of 2022, the kererū has been classified under the IUCN Red List as "Least Concern", and the listing reports an increasing population trend. The Department of Conservation (DOC) classifies the kererū under the New Zealand threat classification system as "not threatened" with an increasing population but views the species as conservation dependent. However, it has been argued that several of the factors that caused the historic decrease in population are still present and could continue to damage the population.

=== The Great Kererū Count ===
A survey of kererū population was undertaken for 10 consecutive days every year from 2013 to 2021, using observations from members of the public. The Great Kererū Count has been claimed to be New Zealand's largest citizen science project. It was led by the conservation organisations Kererū Discovery and Urban Wildlife Trust, in conjunction with city councils in Wellington, Dunedin and Nelson, and Victoria University of Wellington.

The findings from the annual count, together with the results of a separate citizen science project—the annual New Zealand Garden Bird Survey—indicate that there has been a recovery in the population of kererū in suburban areas, with a 79% increase in sightings from 2010 to 2020. The final Great Kererū Count was held in 2021, with more sightings recorded than in previous years. There were 24,562 kererū counted in the 10-day period 17–26 September, with 28% from Auckland.

== Relationship with humans ==
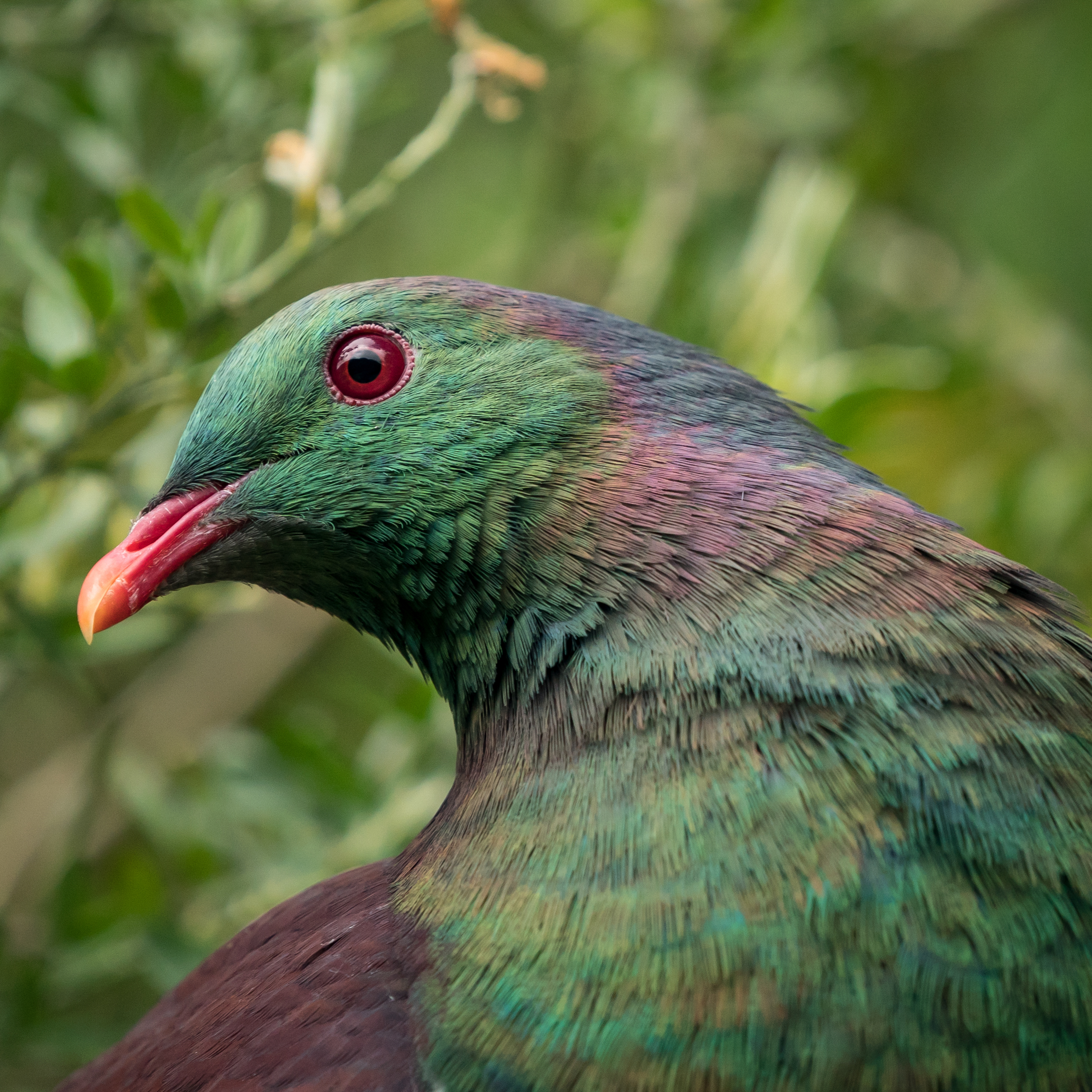
Closeup of head highlighting its iridescent feathers

=== In Māori culture ===
Traditionally used for both its meat and feathers, the kererū is considered taonga to Māori; as such, for various iwi such as Ngāi Tūhoe, kererū forms an important part of their cultural identity. Kererū were the food of choice associated with Puanga celebrations as the birds are fat from eating berries that ripen during this time. They also tended to be easier to catch at this time of year due to their intoxication from fermented berries. Kererū feathers continue to be retained for making kākahu (fine cloaks), while the tail feathers were used to decorate the tahā huahua (food storage containers).

Snaring was the most common method of capturing kererū; less commonly, birds were speared. One type of snaring used waka waituhi, a trap where snares were placed on the sides of a water trough suspended in a tree. As the kererū landed to drink from the trough, they would become caught by the snare. Occasionally, tame kererū were used as decoys to entice others. Once caught, kererū were typically preserved in their own fat within tahā huahua (food storage containers). They were so abundant that New Zealand ornithologist Walter Buller reported at least 8000 birds were caught and prepared in this manner from a grove of miro near Lake Taupō over July and August 1882.

In one Māori legend, the hero and trickster Māui took the form of a kererū when he went down into the underworld in search of his parents. According to this legend, the reason for the kererū's iridescent green-blue and white plumage is because when Māui transformed into the kererū, he was carrying the skirt/apron and belt of his mother, Tāranga. The apron, Te Taro o Tāranga, is represented by the white breast feathers; the belt, Te Tātua a Tāranga, is signified by the green-blue feathers on the neck of the kererū.

=== In archaeological sites ===
Kererū remains have been found in both inland and coastal sites throughout New Zealand. Identification of bone specimens in archaeological sites has been difficult due to their being fragmented during preparation for food, or because fine-mesh sieving was not carried out during excavations to retrieve bone samples. A genetic analysis of bones from paleontological and archaeological sites, to determine the extent of fauna and the human impact on them, identified kererū bones at seven archaeological sites. These sites give insight into the interactions between humans and kererū, including the effect of Māori hunting on historic kererū populations. As well as being found on the main islands of New Zealand, kererū bones have also been recovered from sites excavated at Harataonga Bay on Great Barrier Island. In the South Island, excavations in 2018 at the Raincliff rock art shelter in South Canterbury, revealed kererū along with the bones of rats, extinct moa and New Zealand quail. Kererū bones, along with bones of other forest birds kākā, kākāpō and red-crowned parakeets, were also found in rock shelter sites on Lee Island, Lake Te Anau in Southland.

=== Harvesting ===
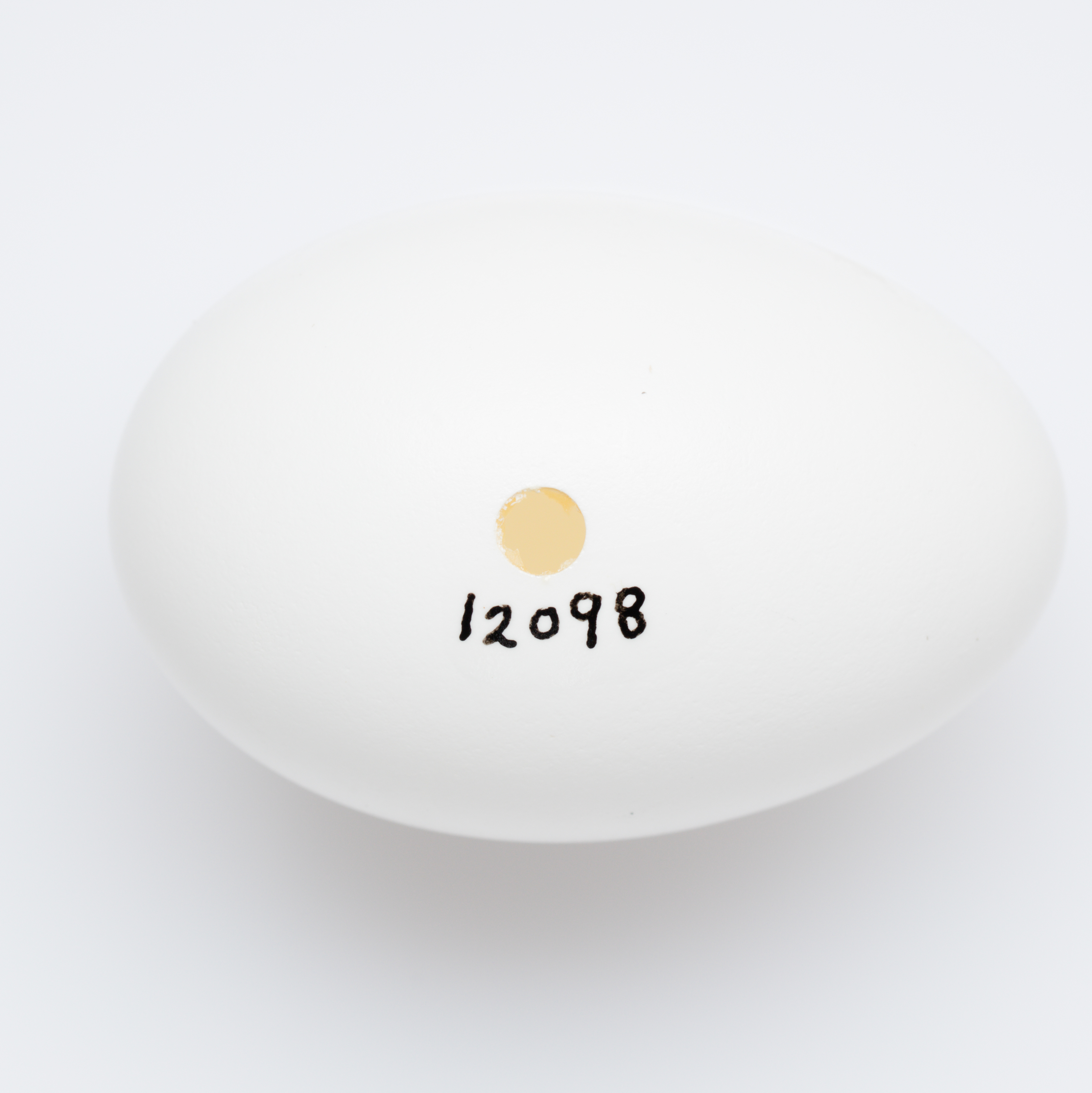
Egg at museum

From the 1990s, the issue of whether to re-establish the customary harvest of kererū has received significant public and political attention. In 1994, the New Zealand Conservation Authority published a discussion paper about allowing the harvest of various species protected under the Wildlife Act 1953, including the kererū. It has been argued that preventing the customary harvests of taonga such as kererū is in-part degrading or facilitating the loss of mātauranga (traditional knowledge) among Māori. Furthermore, some argue that because the Treaty of Waitangi guarantees tangata whenua possession of taonga such as kererū, it therefore guarantees their right to harvest those taonga. Currently, customary use of kererū is restricted to the use of feathers and bones obtained from dead birds collected by DOC.

=== Recognition ===
The kererū is featured on the reverse side of the series 3 (1967–1981) and series 4 (1981–1991) New Zealand twenty-dollar note. In 2018, the kererū was the winner of the annual Bird of the Year competition run by the New Zealand Forest & Bird organisation. In 2019, the exoplanet originally named HD 137388 b was renamed in honour of the kererū.

== See also ==
- List of birds of New Zealand
