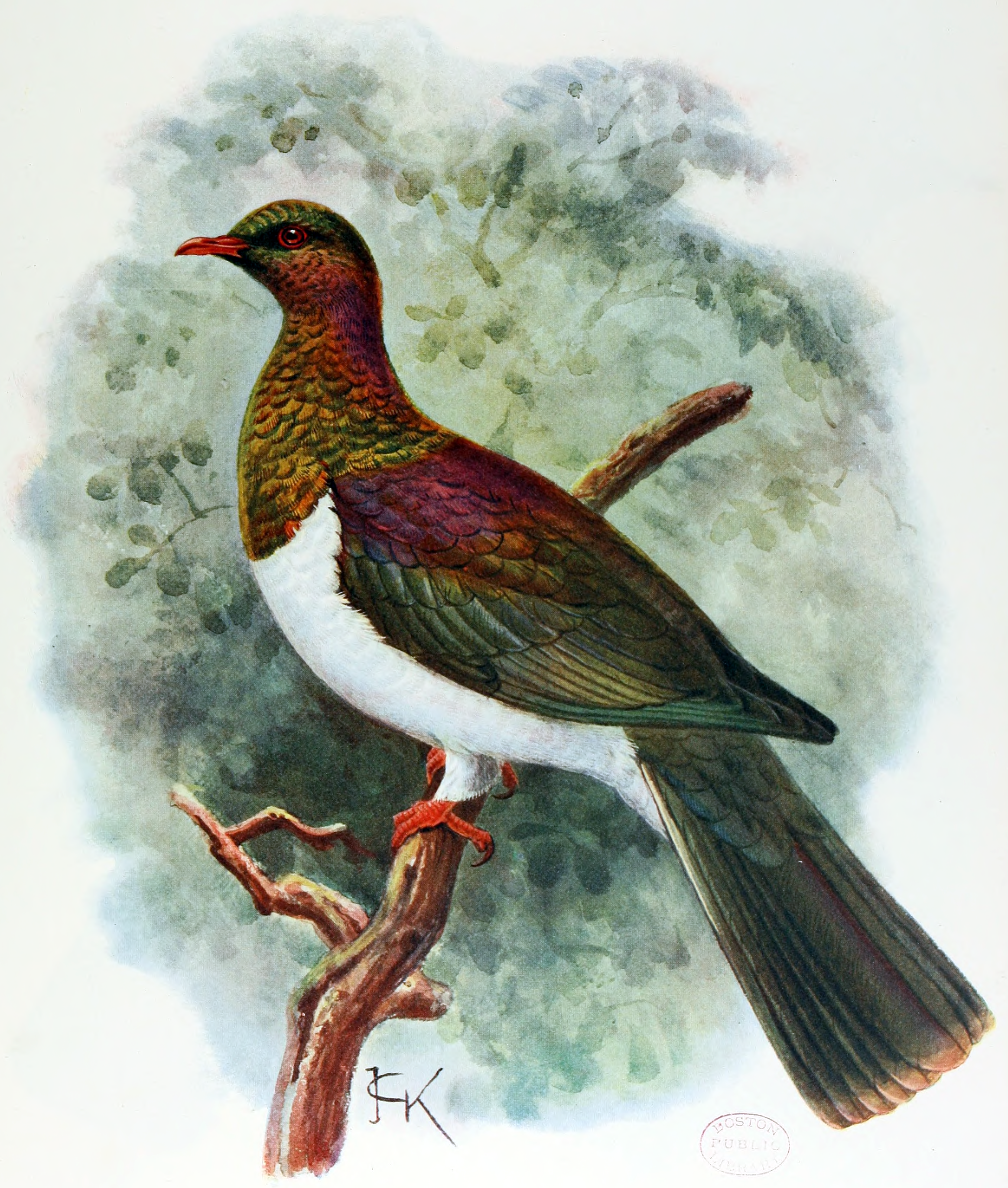
- Illustration by Keulemans, 1907

Conservation status
- Extinct (early 20th century) (IUCN 3.1)

Scientific classification
- Kingdom: Animalia
- Phylum: Chordata
- Class: Aves
- Order: Columbiformes
- Family: Columbidae
- Genus: Hemiphaga
- Species: H. novaeseelandiae
- Subspecies: †H. n. spadicea

Trinomial name
- †Hemiphaga novaeseelandiae spadicea Latham, 1801

= Norfolk pigeon =

Extinct subspecies of bird

The Norfolk pigeon or Norfolk Island pigeon (Hemiphaga novaeseelandiae spadicea), sometimes called the wood quest, is an extinct Norfolk Island subspecies of Hemiphaga novaeseelandiae, the New Zealand subspecies of which is the extant kererū. H. novaeseelandiae probably colonised Norfolk Island from New Zealand during the Pleistocene. The Norfolk pigeon became extinct around the start of the 20th century.

== Taxonomy ==
German naturalist Johann Reinhold Forster described the Norfolk pigeon as Columba argetraea in 1794, however the name was not used. English ornithologist John Latham described it as Columba spadicea in his 1801 work Supplementum Indicis Ornithologici.

Twenty specimens of the Norfolk pigeon are known, including three in the Natural History Museum, Leiden, two in the Natural History Museum New York and one in the World Museum Liverpool. DNA collected and analyzed from toepad tissue indicated that the Norfolk Island pigeon is genetically sister to the New Zealand Hemiphaga novaeseelandiae population.

Early records from Norfolk Island indicate the local people gave it the name "wood quest", however the name was not passed on from the second settlement to the Pitcairn settlers. The term is related to the words "queece", "queest" and "quist" used for the wood pigeon in the West Midlands and southwestern England.

== Ecology ==
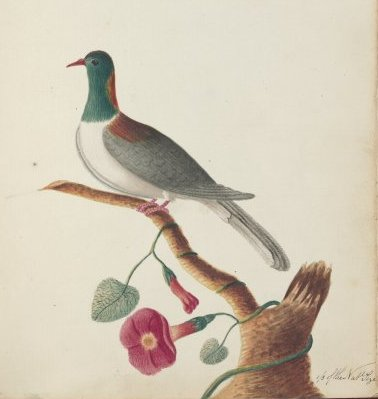
Sketch from John Hunter's Birds & flowers of New South Wales drawn on the spot in 1788, '89 & '90

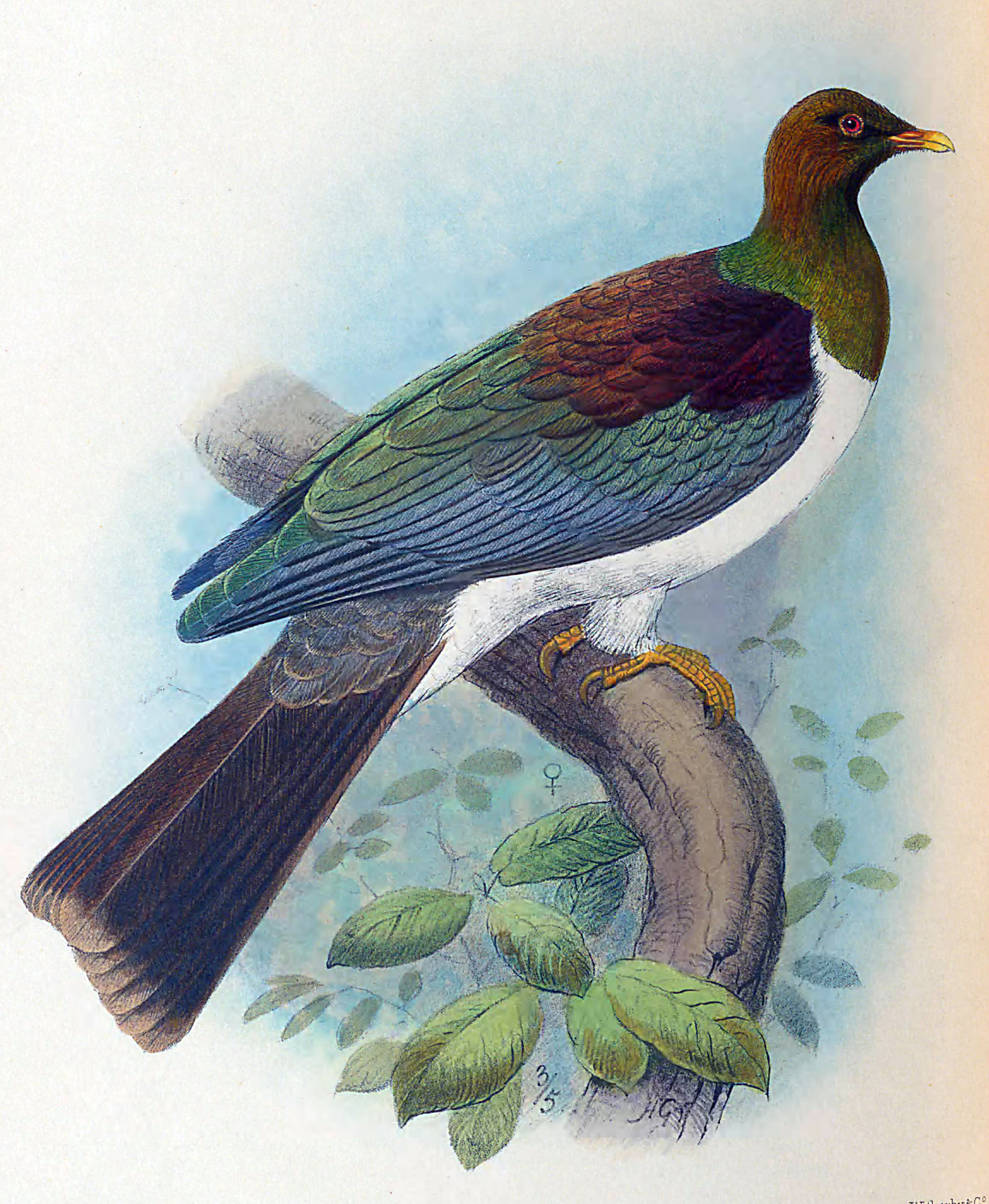
By Henrik Gronvold

The abundance of the Norfolk pigeon at the time of the island's settlement is unknown. Early records indicate the presence of the bird, but do not contain any information on its numbers. Based on the behaviour of the other subspecies, it is likely that the bird relied upon fruiting plants for food.

== Extinction ==
The extinction of the Norfolk pigeon was caused by a combination of the introduction of cats and weasels, habitat destruction by human settlers, and direct hunting by humans. Before European settlement, the bird had been hunted by Polynesian inhabitants of the island. When Europeans reached the island, the pigeon was still there but the Polynesians were not. The Europeans took up the bird as a food source. An officer of the penal colony there, Ensign Abel Dottin William Best, recorded the species as still quite common in 1838, with his journals mentioning his successful hunting of 72 birds, including 25 on 18 September 1838. The last sighting occurred in 1901. Direct hunting by humans was probably the dominant cause of extinction.

== Memorials ==
The Government of Norfolk Island released a stamp commemorating the bird on 24 February 1971.
