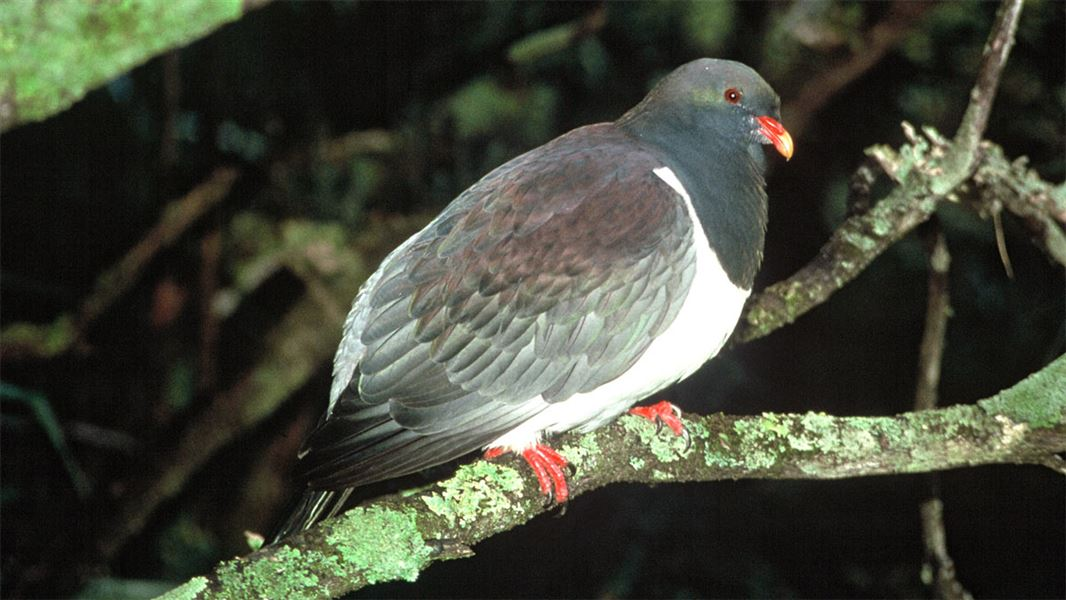

Conservation status
- Vulnerable (IUCN 3.1)

Scientific classification
- Kingdom: Animalia
- Phylum: Chordata
- Class: Aves
- Order: Columbiformes
- Family: Columbidae
- Genus: Hemiphaga
- Species: H. chathamensis

Binomial name
- Hemiphaga chathamensis (Rothschild, 1891)

Synonyms
- Hemiphaga novaseelandiae chathamensis

Audio
- Recording of a Chatham Islands pigeon

= Chatham Islands pigeon =

Species of bird endemic to the Chatham Islands

The Chatham Islands pigeon (Hemiphaga chathamensis), also known as the Chatham pigeon or parea, is a bird endemic to the Chatham Islands in New Zealand. Growing to 800 g (28 oz) in weight and 55 cm (22 in) in length, the Chatham Islands pigeon is closely related to the kererū or New Zealand pigeon (Hemiphaga novaeseelandiae), the only other species in the genus Hemiphaga.

While rated vulnerable by IUCN, it is considered critically threatened in New Zealand. Recovering from a low of 40 birds in the 1980s, the Chatham Islands pigeon population is now over 600, and the species is ranked by the IUCN as "Vulnerable", and by the New Zealand Department of Conservation as at 2017 as "Threatened – Nationally Vulnerable".

The species is largely restricted to the southern forests of Chatham Island (particularly those around the Tuku River). A few have been seen elsewhere on Chatham Island and also further afield on Pitt and South East Islands. They were common in the 1870s but habitat destruction and predation by mammalian invasive species reduced the population to only 40 birds by 1990. Since then, predator control and stock fencing in and around the Tuku valley have resulted in improved breeding success which has led to rapid population growth.

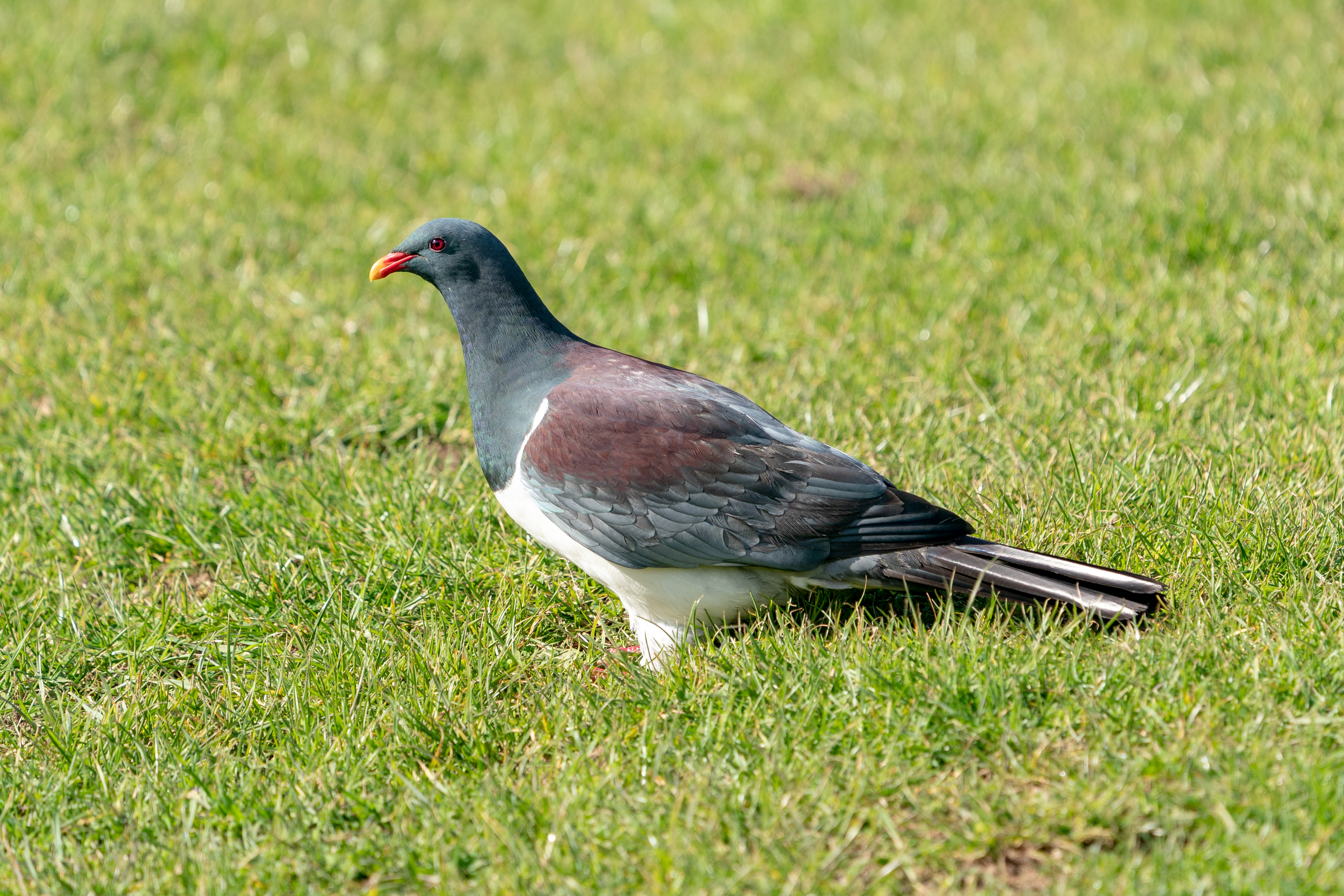
Chatham pigeon or parea foraging in a grassy field

Traditionally considered a subspecies of the kererū, it was proposed in 2001 to be distinct enough to be raised to full species status.

Because the Chatham Islands have been separated from the mainland of New Zealand for so long, the Chatham Islands pigeon has evolved differently from its mainland relative, the kererū. There are a number of differences between the two pigeons. The Chatham Islands pigeon is around 20% heavier than the kererū and has a heavier bill. Unlike the kererū, the Chatham Islands pigeon has an enlarged hind toe which helps it to scrabble about on the forest floor. The Chatham Islands pigeon generally nests from June to October, while the kererū nests from September to January. The Chatham Islands pigeon nests in bracken or fern near the ground while the kererū prefers to nest in a tree, out of harm's way. The Chatham Islands pigeon's egg is also much bigger.

The Chatham Islands pigeon feeds on the fruits of the hoho (Pseudopanax chathamicus), matipo, mahoe and karamū tree, and the foliage of mahoe, hoho and clover. The succulent fruits of the hoho are especially sought after. They are at their best in August and September, which coincides with the peak of the Chatham pigeon's breeding season.

The Chatham Islands pigeon is renowned for their spectacular flying dives, especially by the males, to attract a mate. Most breed at 1 to 2 years of age, laying just one egg. Chicks fledge at about 45 days old and become independent at 3 months. They have a life expectancy of up to 25 years.
