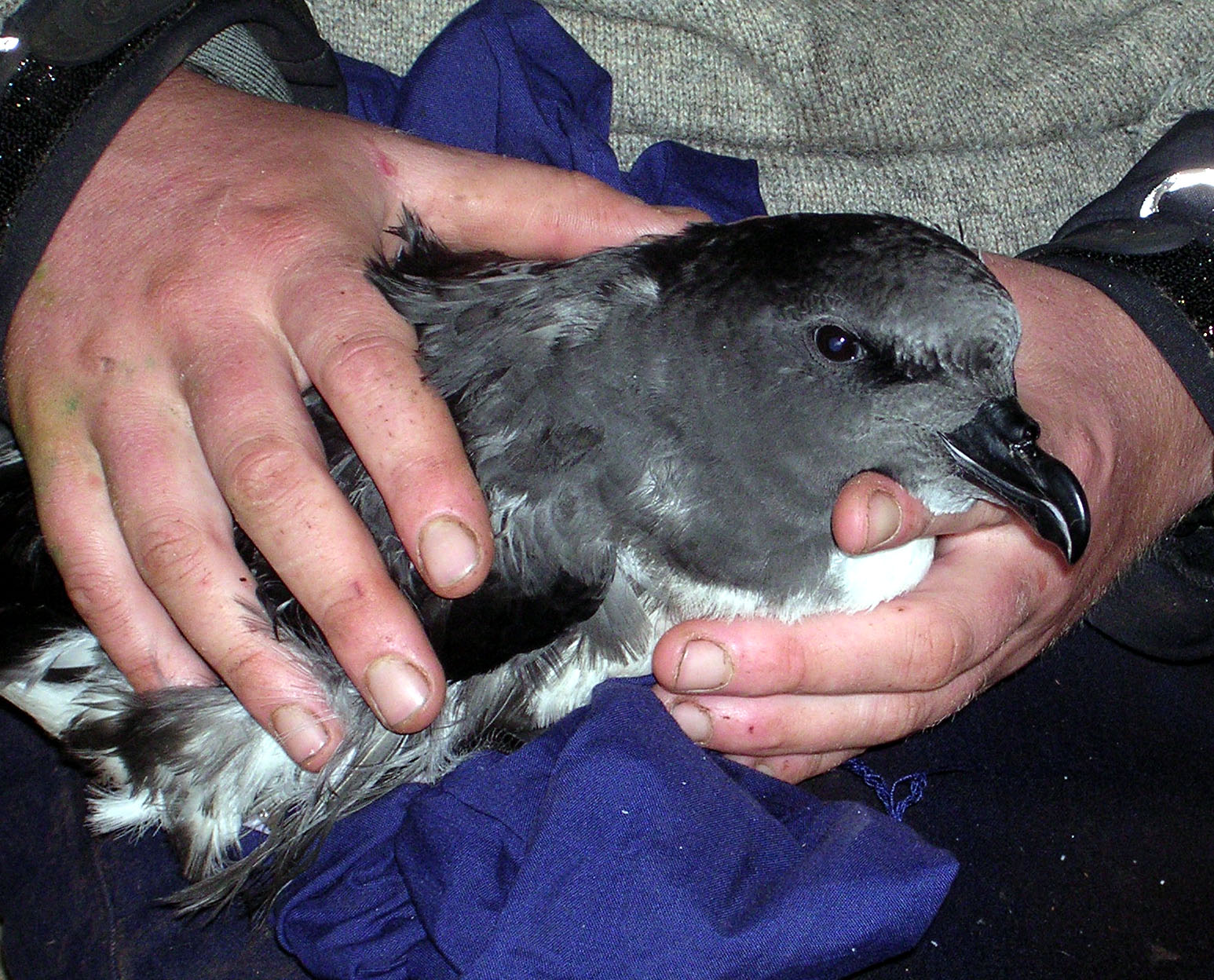
- A magenta petrel chick.

Conservation status
- Critically Endangered (IUCN 3.1)

Scientific classification
- Kingdom: Animalia
- Phylum: Chordata
- Class: Aves
- Order: Procellariiformes
- Family: Procellariidae
- Genus: Pterodroma
- Species: P. magentae

Binomial name
- Pterodroma magentae (Giglioli & Salvadori, 1869)

= Magenta petrel =

Species of bird

The magenta petrel (Pterodroma magentae), or Chatham Island tāiko, is a small seabird in the gadfly petrel genus, Pterodroma. Found exclusively on Chatham Island, New Zealand, it is one of the rarest birds in the world, believed to be extinct for over 100 years before its rediscovery in the 1970s.

== Description ==
This medium-sized petrel has a brownish-grey head, neck, and upper breast, with white underparts. The undersides of the wings are brown. It has a black bill and pink legs. Adults weigh 400–580 g.

The bird nests in 1–3 m long burrows under dense forest. They form long-term monogamous pair bonds, raising one egg at a time, and both partners incubate the egg and feed the chick. The breeding season is between September and May, during which time the birds forage over the open ocean.

== History ==
Fossil records and historic records show that tāiko used to be the most abundant burrowing seabird on Chatham Island, though has not been found to have lived on other islands. Moriori, the indigenous people of the Chatham Islands, harvested tāiko among other birds for food, as evidenced by bones of tāiko found in midden deposits.

The first specimen of the Magenta petrel was collected from His Italian Majesty's ship Magenta on July 22, 1867, in the South Pacific Ocean, midway between New Zealand and South America. The name 'Magenta petrel' and the scientific name P. magentae come from this ship.

The tāiko was believed for be extinct for 111 years. Conservationist David Crockett and his team began to investigate sightings reported by locals in the 1970s, and Crockett caught a tāiko on 1 January 1978. It was another ten years before a tāiko burrow was discovered. This discovery confirmed the link between the specimen collected by the Magenta and the live birds.

== Conservation ==
Formerly widespread on Chatham Island, the tāiko is now confined to the forested Tuku Valley on the south-west of the island. The species is one of the rarest birds in the world. The species is classified as critically endangered due to an assumed population decline in excess of 80% in the last 60 years and the fact that it is restricted to one small location. In the 2005 breeding season, the 13 known breeding pairs successfully fledged 11 chicks. In 2017, 34 breeding pairs were being monitored. The current population is estimated at between 80 and 100 mature individuals.

The main threats to the species are introduced mammalian predators, principally cats and rats, other threats are present from feral pigs collapsing burrows.

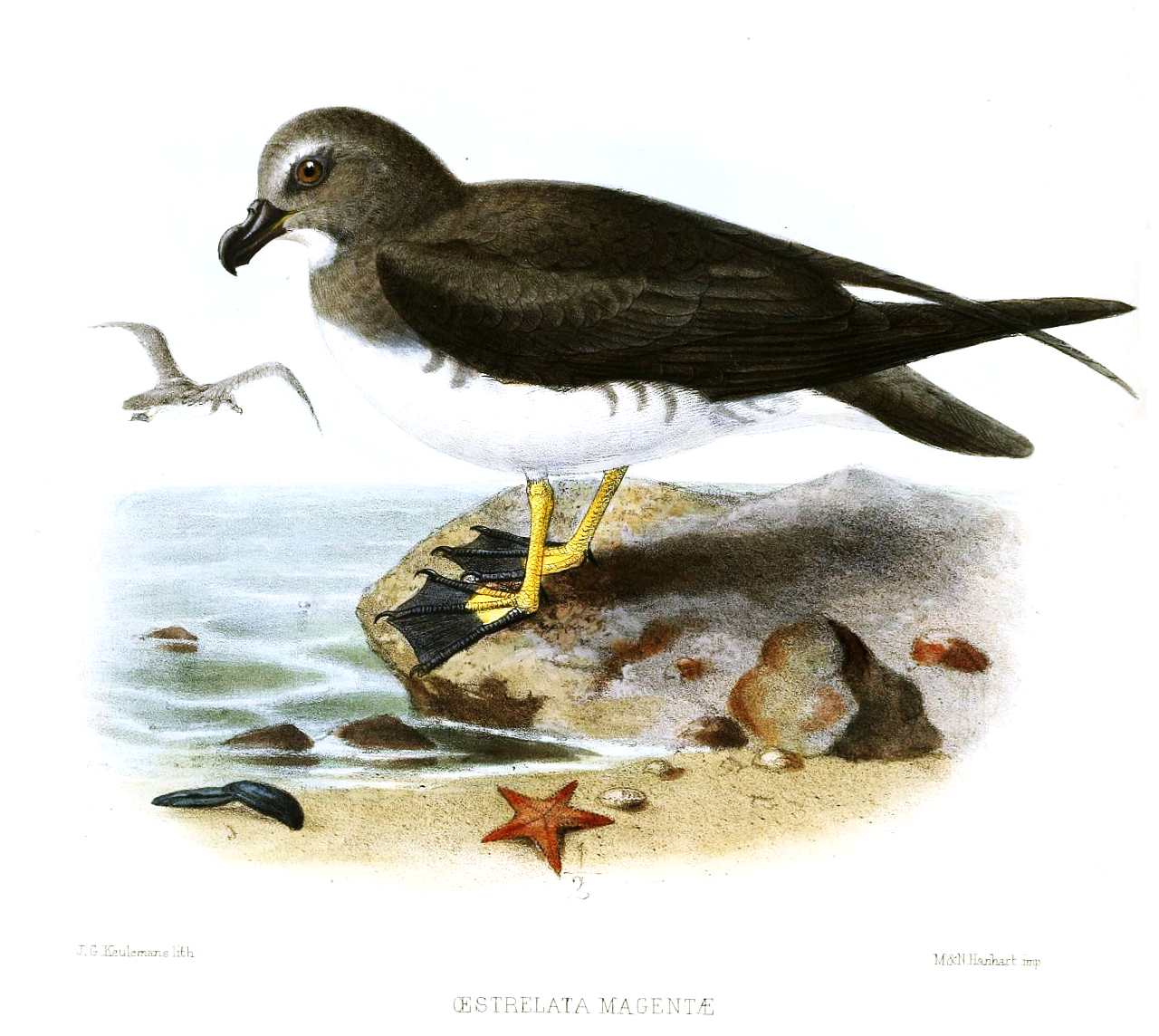
19th century illustration

The land on which tāiko were first rediscovered was privately owned by Manuel and Evelyn Tuanui, who in 1983 donated 1283 hectares of land to the government to protect the species, becoming the Tuku Nature Reserve. In a 2004 report, about 80 percent of tāiko breeding burrows were in this reserve. The Tuanui family were also founding members of the Chatham Island Taiko Trust, an organisation formed to promote taiko conservation work.

A conservation strategy is in place on the island to translocate chicks to an area where the main threats have been removed called the Sweetwater Secure Breeding Site. Studies in other petrel species such as the Manx shearwater, wandering albatross, and Cory's shearwater, have shown that birds return to the site in which they fledged. In 2007, eight chicks were successfully translocated and fledged from the breeding site. There has also been a predator-proof fence built around a small area of land since 2006, 60 tāiko have been relocated to this area.
