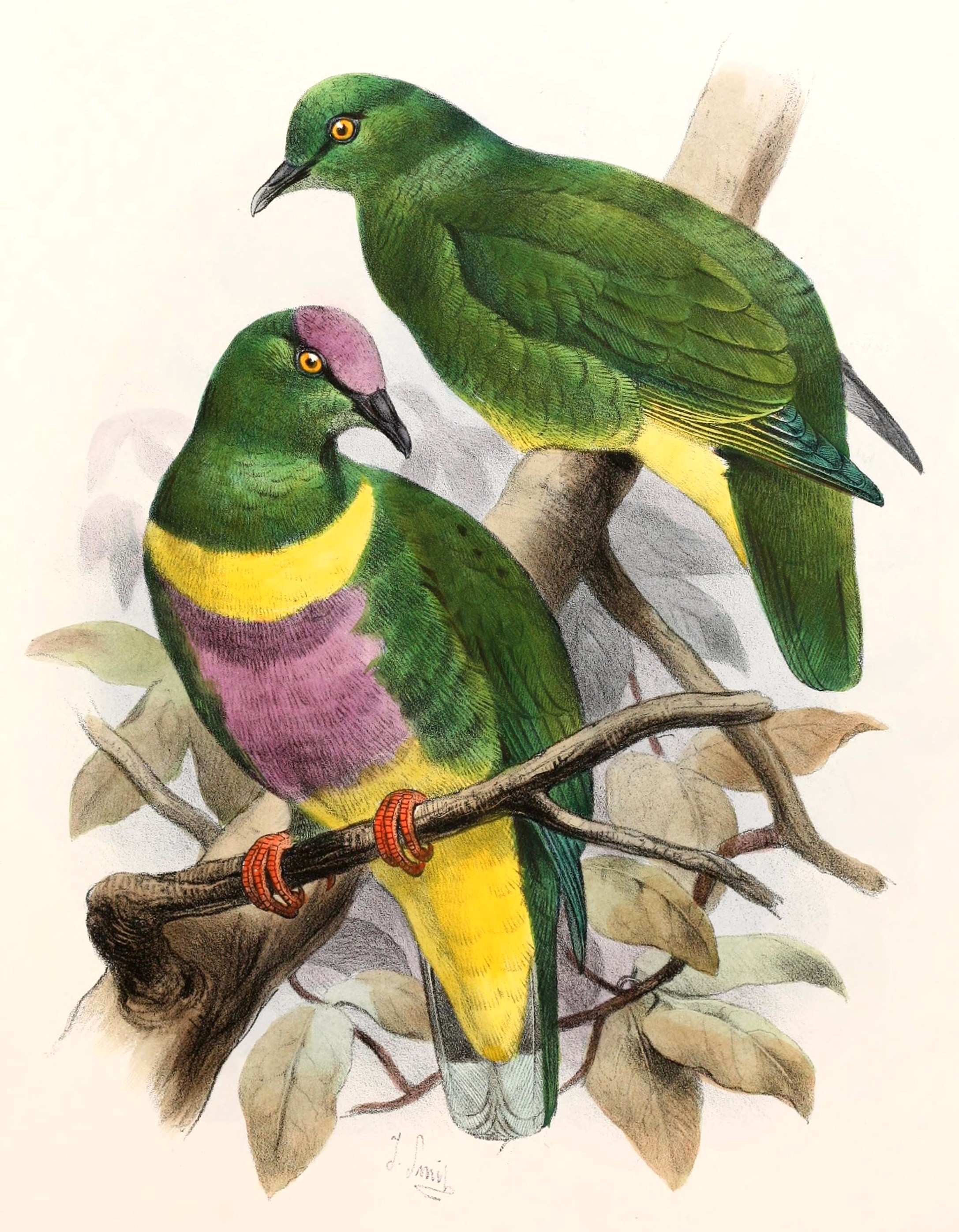
- Ptilinopus solomonensis pair

Scientific classification
- Kingdom: Animalia
- Phylum: Chordata
- Class: Aves
- Order: Columbiformes
- Family: Columbidae
- Subfamily: Raphinae
- Tribe: Ptilinopodini; Selby, 1835

Genera
- 5 and 2 extinct, see text

= Ptilinopinae =

Subfamily of birds

Ptilinopinae is a subfamily of birds from the pigeon and dove family Columbidae. It consists of five extant genera (formerly six) and two extinct genera.

Since 2007 Columbidae have been subdivided into three subfamilies, which are now called Columbinae, Claravinae and Raphinae. The extant genera that were in Ptilinopinae have been placed in the Ptilinopodini tribe of the Raphinae subfamily.

== Genera ==
- Drepanoptila Bonaparte, 1855 – one species, now Ptilinopus holosericeus
- Ducula Hodgson, 1836
- Gymnophaps Salvadori, 1874
- Hemiphaga Bonaparte, 1854
- Lopholaimus Gould, 1841
- Ptilinopus Swainson, 1825
- †Rupephaps Worthy et al., 2009
- †Tongoenas Steadman and Takano, 2020

Ptilinopus heads
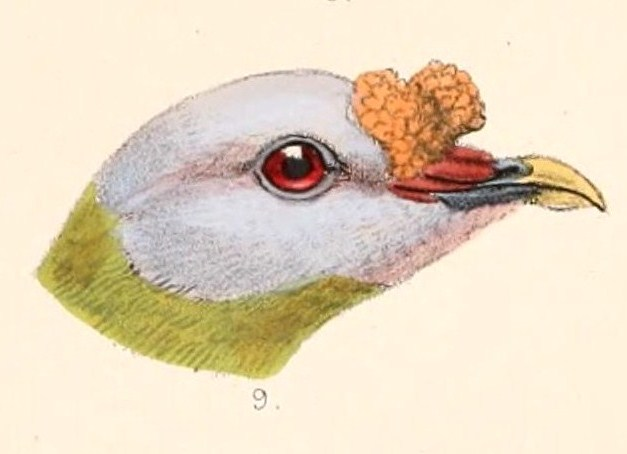
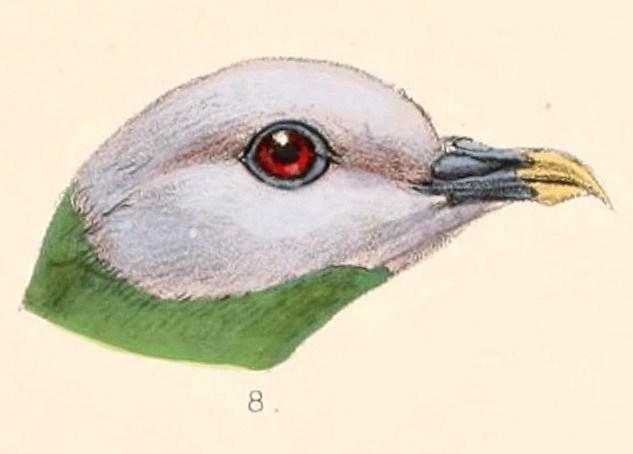
Ptilinopus granulifrons and P. hyogastrus (below)

== Gallery of genera ==
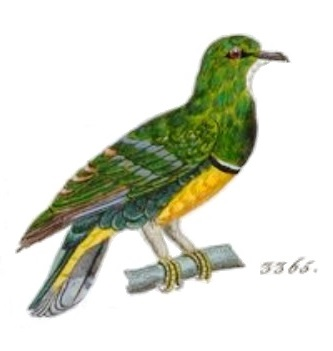
Drepanoptila

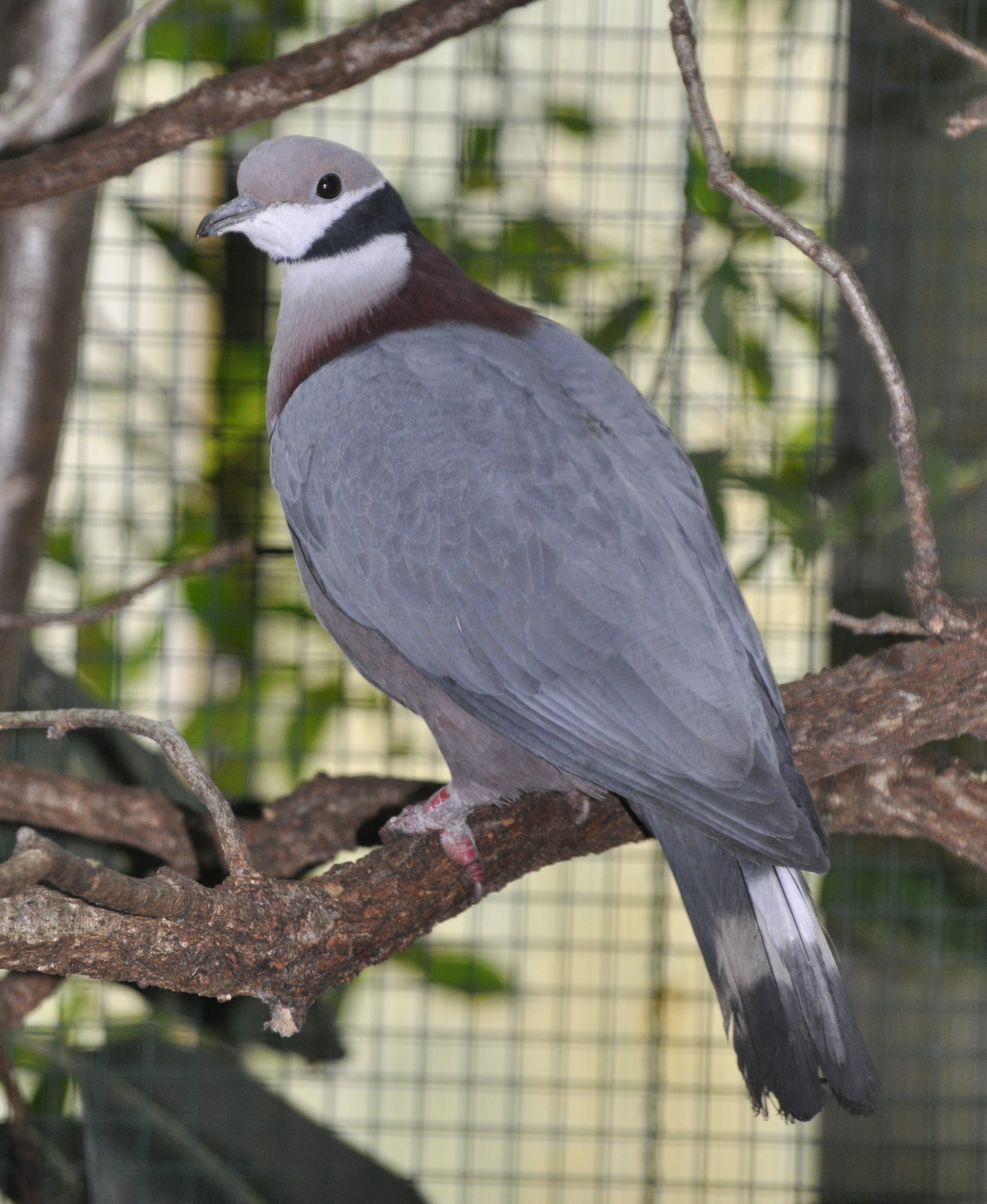
Ducula

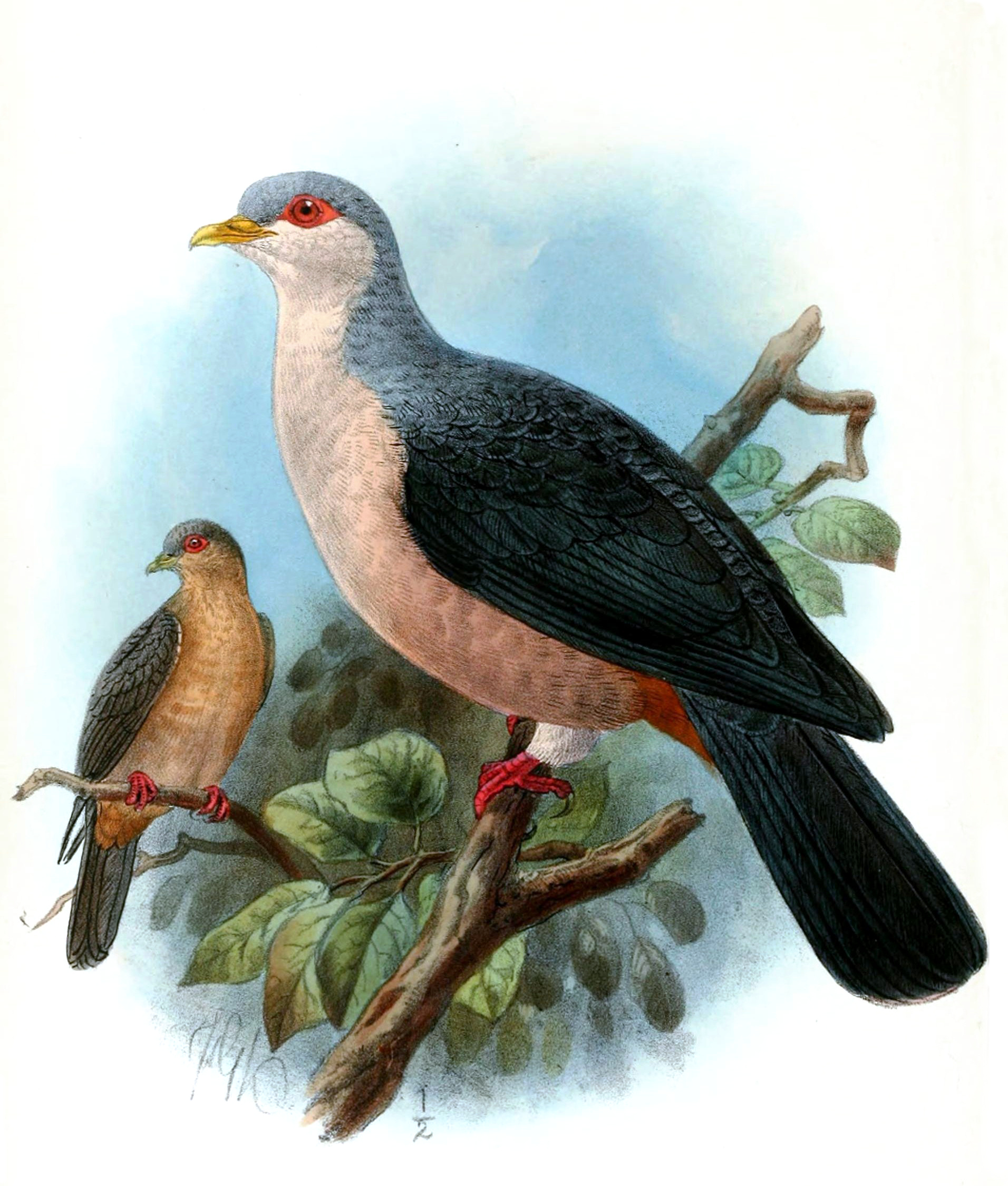
Gymnophaps

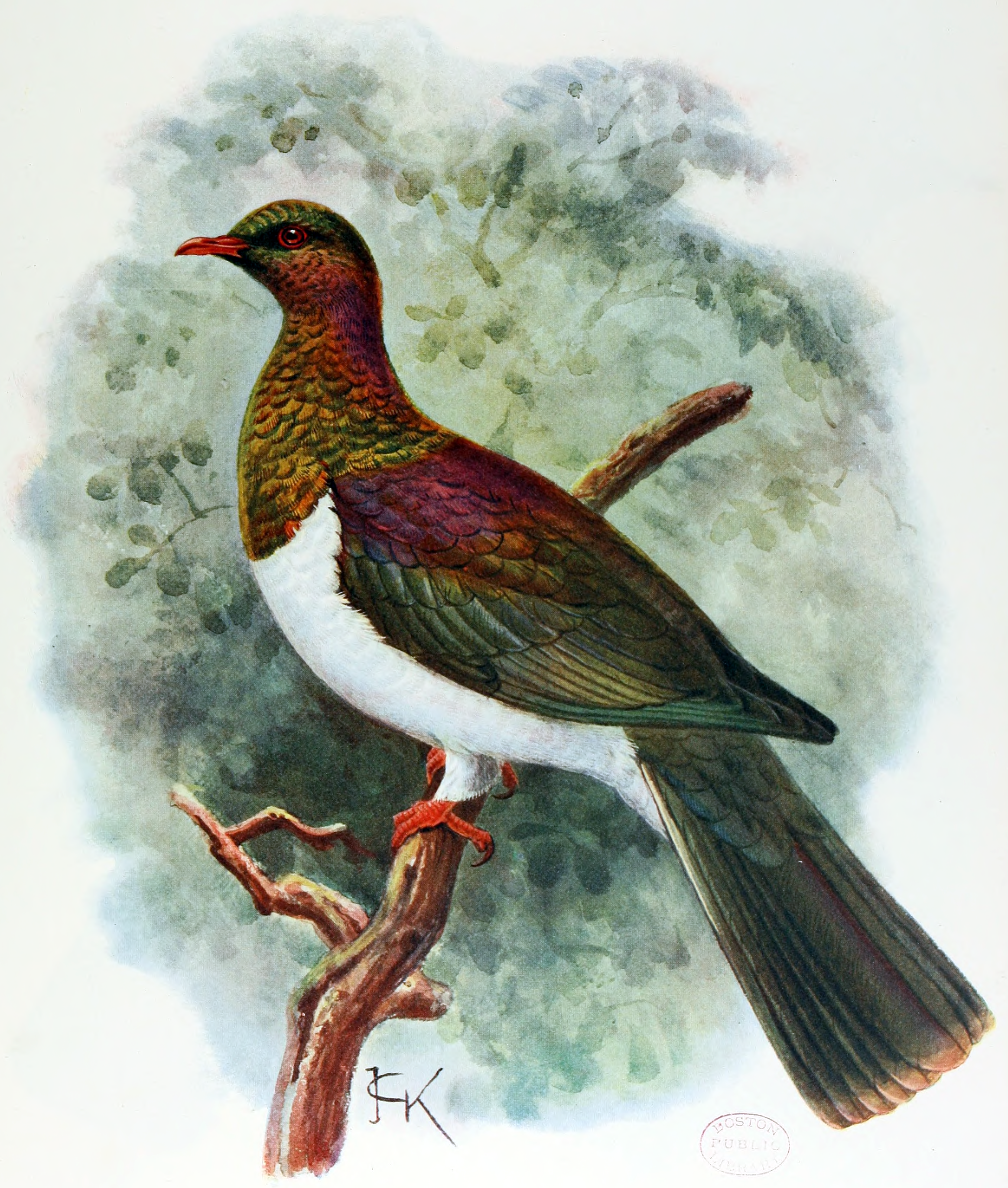
Hemiphaga

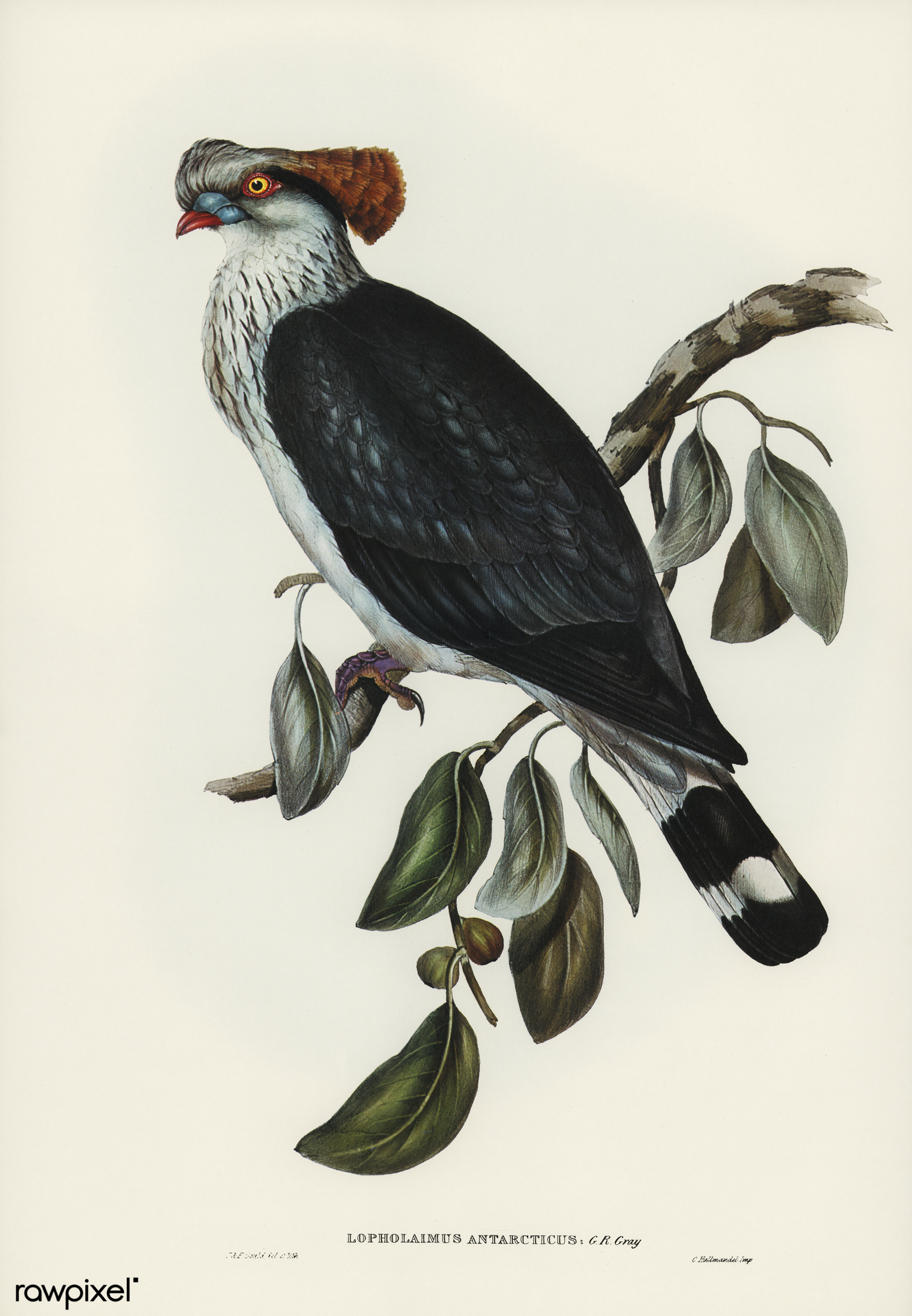
Lopholaimus

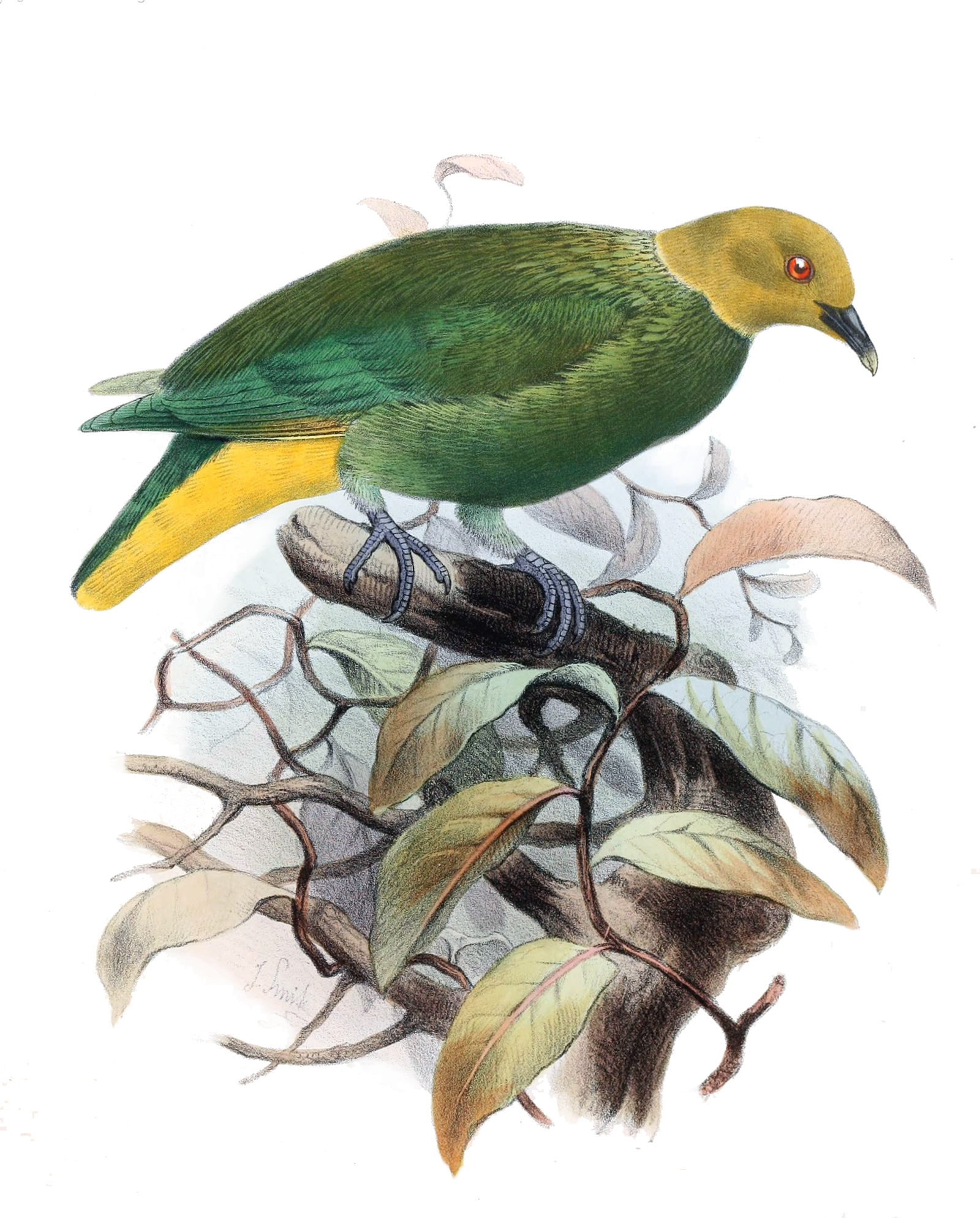
Ptilinopus
