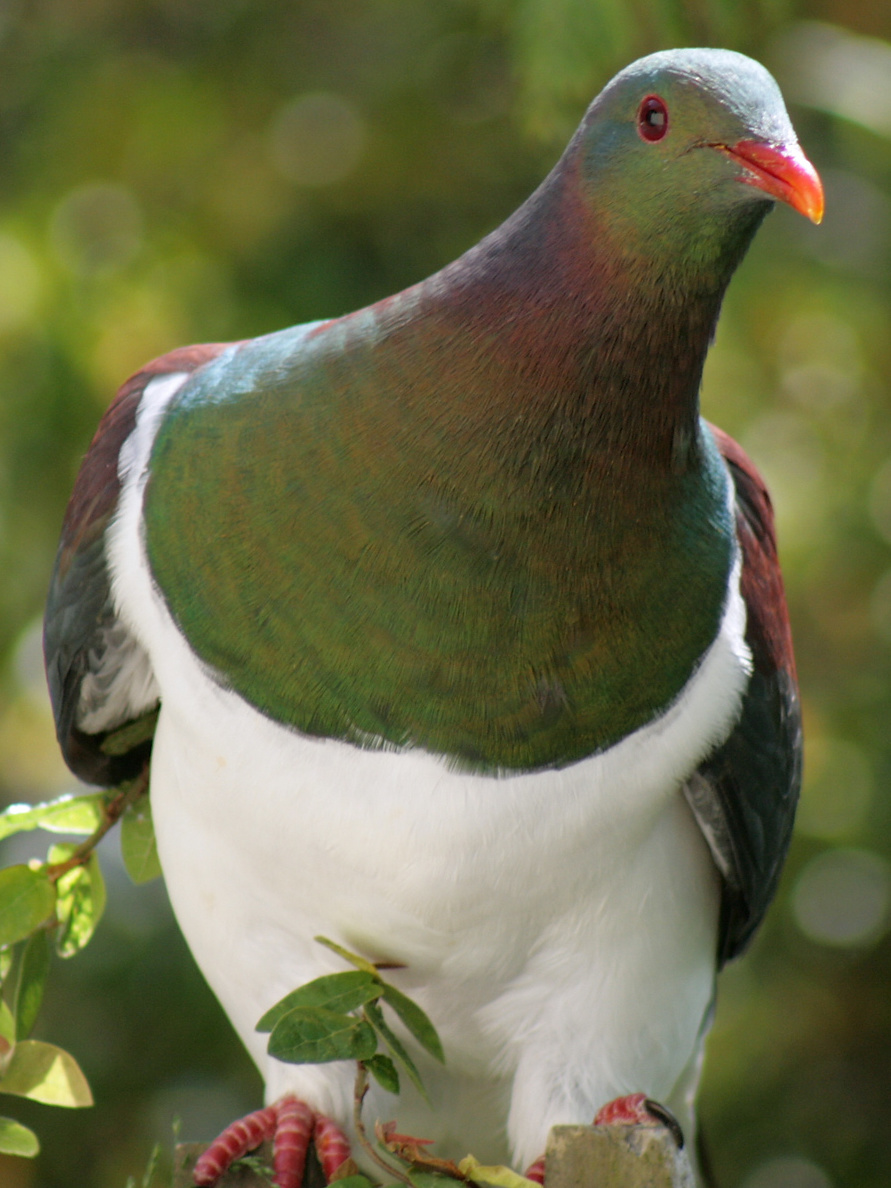
- H. novaeseelandiae novaeseelandiae

Scientific classification
- Kingdom: Animalia
- Phylum: Chordata
- Class: Aves
- Order: Columbiformes
- Family: Columbidae
- Tribe: Ptilinopodini
- Genus: Hemiphaga; Bonaparte, 1854

Type species
- Columba novaeseelandiae Gmelin, 1789

Species
- Hemiphaga chathamensis; Hemiphaga novaseelandiae

= Hemiphaga =

Genus of birds

Hemiphaga is a genus of large pigeons from New Zealand and Norfolk Island. There are two species, one of which is divided into two subspecies.

Hemiphaga novaseelandiae consists of the kererū or New Zealand pigeon (H. n. novaseelandiae) of the main New Zealand archipelago, and the Norfolk pigeon (H. n. spadicea) of Norfolk Island (a territory of Australia), which became extinct in the early 20th century. The subspecies differed in their plumage colour and shape.

The other species is the Chatham Islands pigeon (Hemiphaga chathamensis) of the Chatham Islands, 650 km from the main New Zealand archipelago. Previously considered a subspecies (H. n. chathamensis) of the kererū, it was proposed in 2001 that it was distinct enough to be raised to full species status, and this has been accepted by most authorities.

== Taxonomy ==
The genus Hemiphaga was introduced by the French naturalist Charles Lucien Bonaparte in 1854 with Hemiphaga novaeseelandiae as the type species. The name combines the Ancient Greek hēmi meaning "half" with the end of the genus name Carpophaga, "fruit eating", introduced by Prideaux John Selby in 1835, as Bonaparte considered the genus to be related both to Carpophaga and to Megaloprepia.

Genus Hemiphaga – Bonaparte, 1854 – two species
Common name	Scientific name and subspecies	Range	Size and ecology	IUCN status and estimated population
New Zealand pigeon or kererū	Hemiphaga novaeseelandiae (Gmelin, 1789) Two subspecies: H. n. novaeseelandiae; N. h. spadicea	Northland to Stewart Island/Rakiura and offshore islands	Size: Habitat: Diet:	LC
Chatham pigeon or parea	Hemiphaga chathamensis (Rothschild, 1891)	Chatham Islands in New Zealand	Size: Habitat: Diet:	VU
