= Tuku Nature Reserve =

Nature reserve on Chatham Island, New Zealand

Coordinates: 44°04′S 176°36′W

The Tuku Nature Reserve is a nature reserve on Chatham Island, New Zealand, in the Tuku-a-tamatea (Tuku) River Valley in the south-west of the island. The 1238 hectares of land, largely covered with dense native forest, are owned by the New Zealand government and is managed by its Department of Conservation.

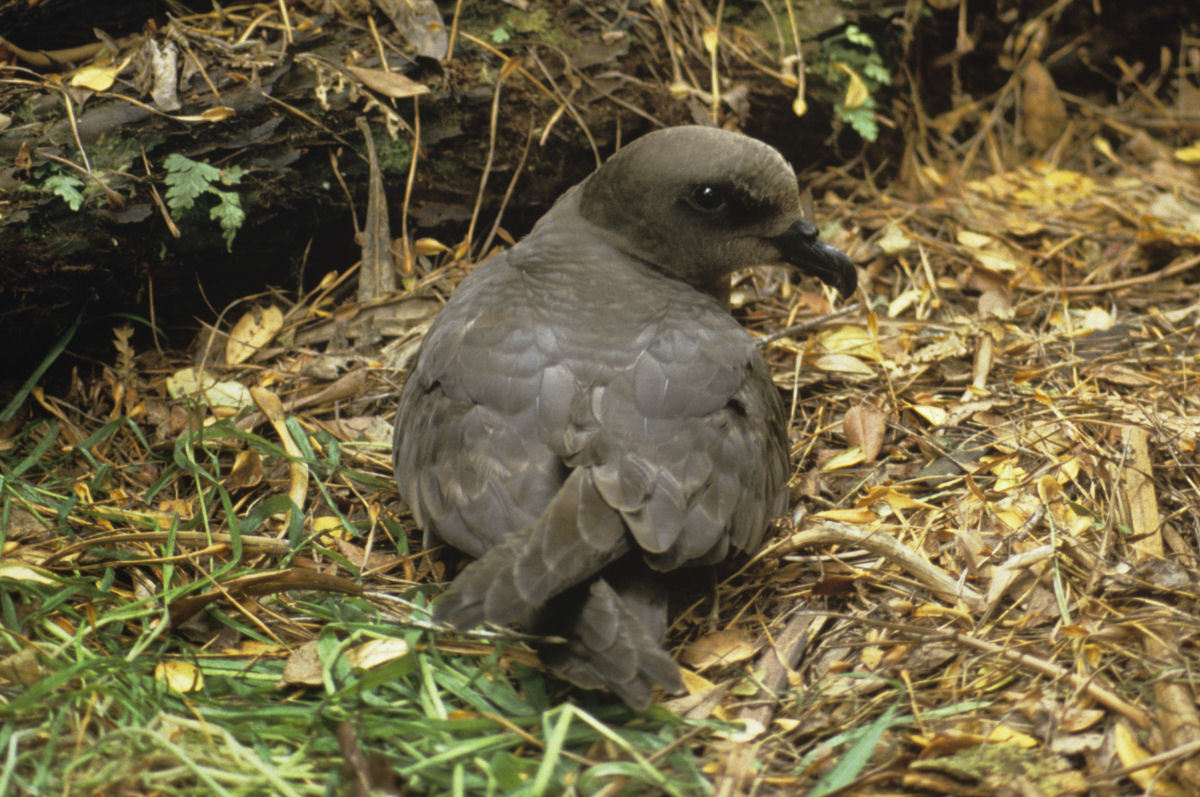
Magenta petrel

Before Crown ownership, the land was owned by Manuel and Evelyn Tuanui. The Tuanuis assisted ornithologist David Crockett in discovering the magenta petrel (Pterodroma magentae), or Chatham Island tāiko, on the land in 1978. This small burrow-nesting seabird had been considered extinct for over 100 years, and remains critically endangered. The Tuanuis donated the land that now forms the Reserve in 1983 for the conservation management of the tāiko, with adjacent land covenanted for the same purpose. The reserve is important for the conservation of the tāiko. As of 2004, 80% of tāiko breeding burrows are inside the reserve.

== Flora and fauna ==
The reserve comprises an area of forested, peat-covered tableland dissected by the Tuku River and its tributaries and dominated by tarahinau. The valley also contains kōpi, karamū, hoho and matipō, with abundant tree ferns. As well as the tāiko, the reserve is important for the conservation of other animals and plants endemic to the Chatham Islands, such as the parea or Chatham Islands pigeon.
