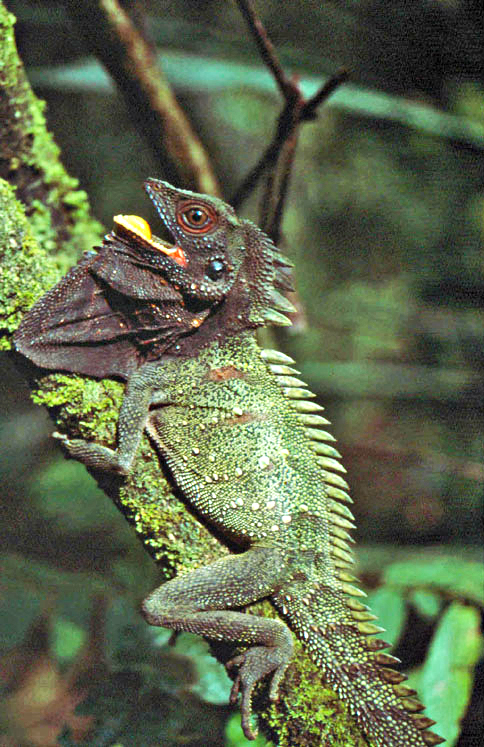

Scientific classification
- Kingdom: Animalia
- Phylum: Chordata
- Class: Reptilia
- Order: Squamata
- Suborder: Iguania
- Family: Agamidae
- Subfamily: Amphibolurinae
- Genus: Hypsilurus; W. Peters, 1867

= Hypsilurus =

Genus of lizards

Hypsilurus is a genus of arboreal lizards in the family Agamidae. The genus is endemic to Melanesia.

== Species ==
As of 2020, Hypsilurus contains the following 18 species:

- Hypsilurus auritus (Meyer, 1874)
- Hypsilurus binotatus (Meyer, 1874) – two-marked forest dragon
- Hypsilurus bruijnii (W. Peters & Doria, 1878) – Bruijn's forest dragon
- Hypsilurus capreolatus Kraus & S. Myers, 2012
- Hypsilurus geelvinkianus (W. Peters & Doria, 1878) – New Guinea forest dragon
- Hypsilurus godeffroyi (W. Peters, 1867) – northern forest dragon
- Hypsilurus hikidanus Manthey & Denzer, 2006 – Hikida's forest dragon
- Hypsilurus longi (Macleay, 1877) – Long's forest dragon
- Hypsilurus macrolepis W. Peters, 1872
- Hypsilurus magnus Manthey & Denzer, 2006
- Hypsilurus modestus (Meyer, 1874) – modest forest dragon
- Hypsilurus nigrigularis (Meyer, 1874)
- Hypsilurus ornatus Manthey & Denzer, 2006 – Denzer's forest dragon
- Hypsilurus papuensis (Macleay, 1877) – Papua forest dragon
- Hypsilurus schoedei (T. Vogt, 1932) – Vogt's forest dragon
- Hypsilurus schultzewestrumi (Urban, 1999)
- Hypsilurus spinosus (A.M.C. Duméril & A.H.A. Duméril, 1851)
- Hypsilurus tenuicephalus Mathey & Denzer, 2006

Three species previously assigned to the genus Hypsilurus have now been moved to the genus Lophosaurus:

- Hypsilurus boydii (Macleay, 1884) – Boyd's forest dragon
- Hypsilurus dilophus (A.M.C. Duméril & Bibron, 1837) – Indonesian forest dragon
- Hypsilurus spinipes (A.M.C. Duméril & A.H.A. Duméril, 1851) – southern forest dragon, southern angle-headed dragon

Nota bene: A binomial authority in parentheses indicates that the species was originally described in a genus other than Hypsilurus.
