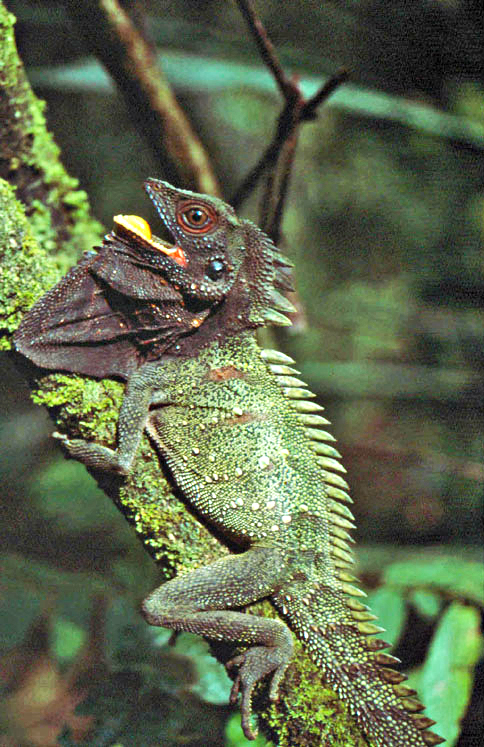
- Lophosaurus dilophus; Lakekamu Basin, Papua New Guinea.

Conservation status
- Least Concern (IUCN 3.1)

Scientific classification
- Kingdom: Animalia
- Phylum: Chordata
- Class: Reptilia
- Order: Squamata
- Suborder: Iguania
- Family: Agamidae
- Genus: Lophosaurus
- Species: L. dilophus

Binomial name
- Lophosaurus dilophus (Duméril & Bibron, 1837)

Synonyms
- Lophyrus dilophus Duméril & Bibron, 1837; Tiare dilophe Duméril & Bibron, 1837; Calotes megapogon Schlegel in Duméril & Bibron, 1837; Tiaris megapogon John Edward Gray, 1845 (fide Boulenger, 1885); Gonocephalus dilophus Adolf Bernard Meyer, 1874; Gonyocephalus dilophus Boulenger, 1885; Gonyocephalus dilophus De Rooij, 1915; Goniocephalus dilophus Loveridge, 1948; Gonocephalus dilophus Wermuth, 1967; Hypsilurus dilophus Manthey & Schuster, 1999; Hypsilurus dilophus Kraus & Myers, 2012; Lophosaurus dilophus Denzer and Manthey, 2016

= Lophosaurus dilophus =

Species of lizard

Lophosaurus dilophus, the crowned forest dragon or Indonesian forest dragon, is a large arboreal agamid lizard found in New Guinea and the Moluccan islands, Indonesia.

== Description ==
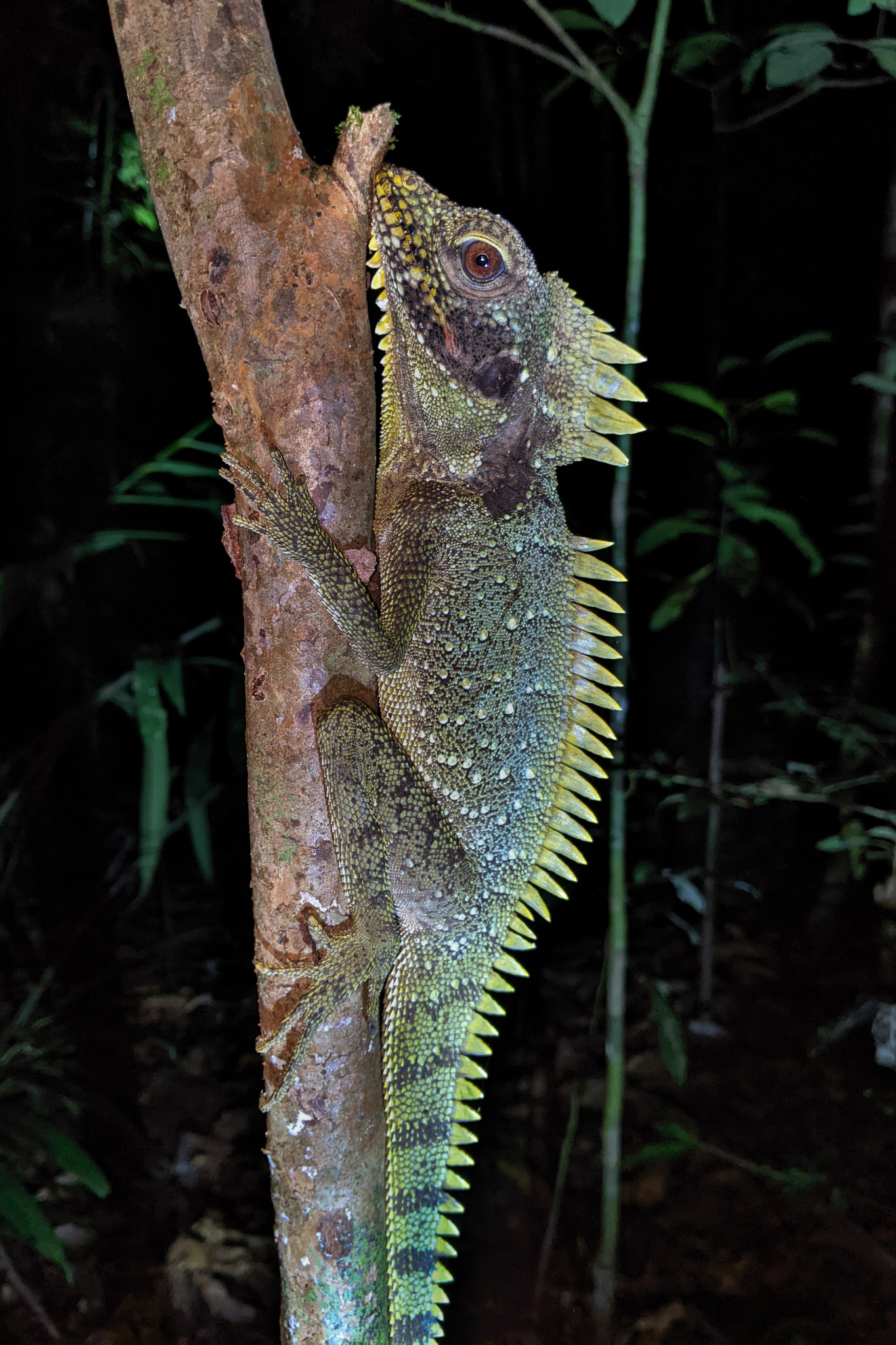
In Indonesia

A large, short-tailed species with heterogeneous dorsal scalation and a discontinuous vertebral crest. There are several slightly enlarged scales below the tympanum, a row of enlarged submaxillaries and a series of large, lanceolate scales on the anterior edge of the gular pouch.

The species differs visually from Boyd's forest dragon, as it lacks the large, conical scales below the tympanum; additionally, it differs from the southern forest dragon in that it has lanceolate scales on the nuchal and dorsal crests, rather than triangular. Overall, the species differs from hypsilurid lizards in that it has a heterogeneous (rather than homogeneous) dorsal scalation.

== Distribution ==
This species is found in Papua New Guinea and the Moluccan Islands of Indonesia. It is present across the entire island of New Guinea, although it appears to have an upper elevation limit of 800m (2624.8'). It has been recorded on the Moluccan islands of Aru and Kei, Batanta and Salawati in West Papua Province, Numfoor and Yapen in Papua Province, Indonesian New Guinea and Fergusson Island in Milne Bay Province, Papua New Guinea. As this species appears to exhibit a preference for rainforest or former rainforest, it is probably absent from the southern savannah of the Trans-Fly; no records from this region are known.

== Habitat and ecology ==
Found in lowland and mid-montane primary and secondary rainforest, it is primarily seen in the forest interior or in regrowth areas; the species will persist in areas of agriculture or private gardens with available trees. It is an omnivorous and arboreal species, whose diet includes insects and small fruits.

== Conservation ==
Although lowland rainforest in Papua New Guinea is increasingly being cleared for logging and conversion to agriculture, this species is widespread across the island and can persist in some modified habitats, so it's unlikely to be in any imminent danger.

The species is occasionally traded in small numbers from Papua Province in Indonesian New Guinea. It is not CITES-listed and is not legally protected in Indonesia, but the level of trade that has been observed appears unlikely to have a significant effect on wild populations.

== Taxonomy ==
Additional research is needed to clarify the taxonomy of what is more than likely a complex of species.
