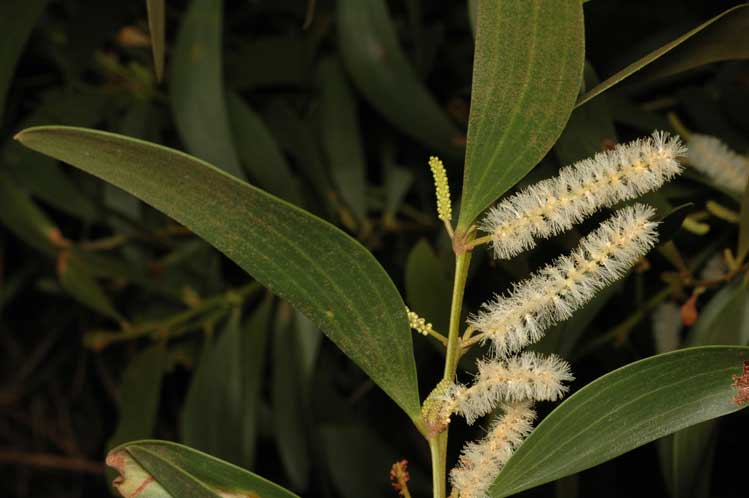

Scientific classification
- Kingdom: Plantae
- Clade: Tracheophytes
- Clade: Angiosperms
- Clade: Eudicots
- Clade: Rosids
- Order: Fabales
- Family: Fabaceae
- Subfamily: Caesalpinioideae
- Clade: Mimosoid clade
- Genus: Acacia
- Species: A. calyculata

Binomial name
- Acacia calyculata A.Cunn. ex Benth.
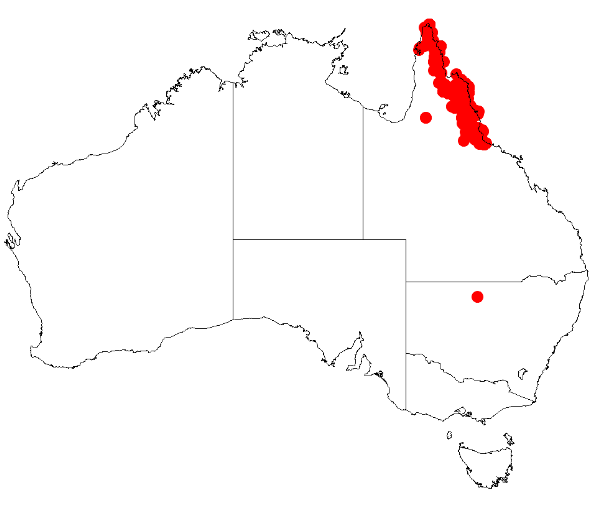
- Occurrence data from AVH

Synonyms
- Acacia australis Domin ex Velen.; Acacia vilhelmii Domin; Racosperma calyculatum (Benth.) Pedley; Acacia holcocarpa auct. non Benth.: Mueller, F.J.H. von (1879); Acacia holcocarpa auct. non Benth.: Mueller, F.J.H. von (1888)

= Acacia calyculata =

Species of legume

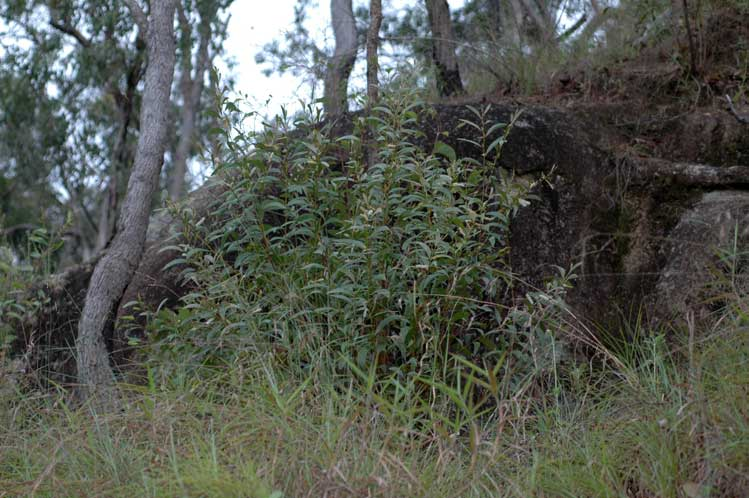
Habit near the Gillies Highway and Lake Barrine

Acacia calyculata is a species of flowering plant in the family Fabaceae and is endemic to Queensland, Australia. It is a glabrous shrub with many stems and thick, flattened branchlets, very narrowly elliptic to narrowly elliptic phyllodes, spikes of white to cream-coloured flowers, and linear, woody pods up to 110 mm (4.3 in) long.

== Description ==
Acacia calyculata is a glabrous shrub with many stems and the typically grows to a height of 2.5 m (8 ft 2 in). It has thick, flattened branches and brown to grey, flaky bark. Its phyllodes are very narrowly elliptic to narrowly elliptic, 40–125 mm (1.6–4.9 in) long and 5–25 mm (0.20–0.98 in) wide with three conspicuous main veins. The flowers are white to cream-coloured and borne in spikes 14–36 mm (0.55–1.42 in) long. Flowering occurs throughout the year and the pods are linear, tapered near the base, circular to four-sided in cross sectiom, 50–110 mm (2.0–4.3 in) long and 3–5 mm (0.12–0.20 in) wide, woody, striated and glabrous containing dark brown, oblong to elliptic seeds 3.5–5.6 mm (0.14–0.22 in) long with a narrowly cone-shaped aril.

== Taxonomy ==
Acacia calyculata was first formally described in 1842 by George Bentham in Hooker's London Journal of Botany from specimens collected by Allan Cunningham on Fitzroy Island.

== Distribution and habitat ==
This species of wattle is endemic to Queensland where it grows in shallow, rocky soils or sand in open forest, woodland, heath or scrub, often on steep hillsides in coastal areas from the Cape York Peninsula down to around Townsville in the south.

== Conservation status ==
Acacia calyculata is listed as of 'least concern" under the Queensland Government Nature Conservation Act 1992.

== See also ==
- List of Acacia species
