= Duivenbode =

Duivenbode, also spelt Duyvenbode, Duijvenbode, or Duivenboden, is a Dutch family name which may refer to:

- Dirk van Duijvenbode (born 1992), Dutch darts player
- Maarten Dirk van Renesse van Duivenbode (1804–1878) Dutch merchant, trader in bird skins on Ternate (Dutch East Indies)
- Mike van Duivenbode (born 1999), Dutch darts player
- Theo van Duivenbode (born 1943), Dutch soccer player
