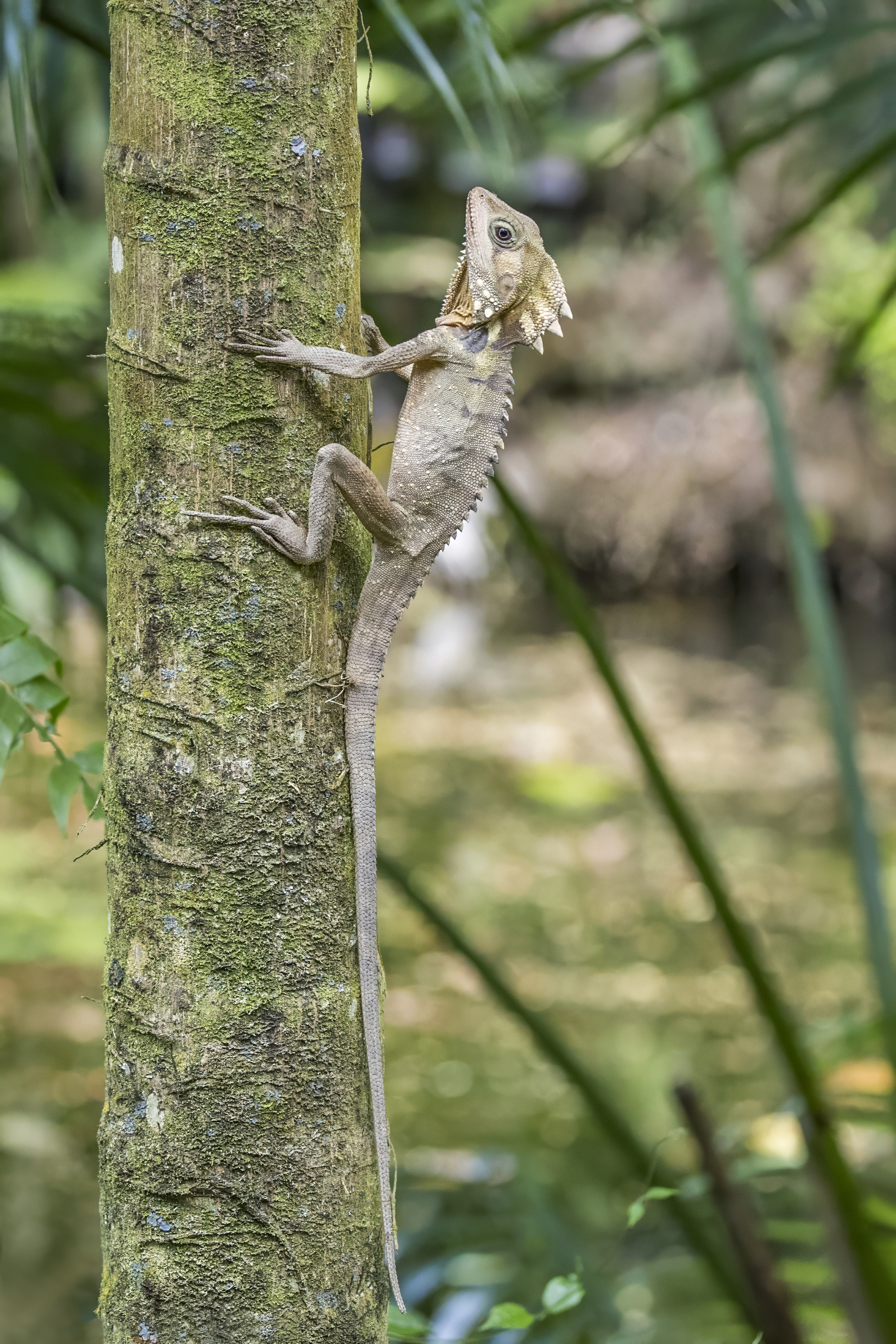
- Daintree National Park, Queensland, Australia

Conservation status
- Least Concern (IUCN 3.1)

Scientific classification
- Kingdom: Animalia
- Phylum: Chordata
- Class: Reptilia
- Order: Squamata
- Suborder: Iguania
- Family: Agamidae
- Genus: Lophosaurus
- Species: L. boydii

Binomial name
- Lophosaurus boydii (Macleay, 1884)

Synonyms
- Tiaris boydii Macleay, 1884; Gonyocephalus boydii — Boulenger, 1885; Hypsilurus boydii — Cogger, 1983; Lophosaurus boydii — Denzer & Manthey, 2016

= Boyd's forest dragon =

Species of lizard

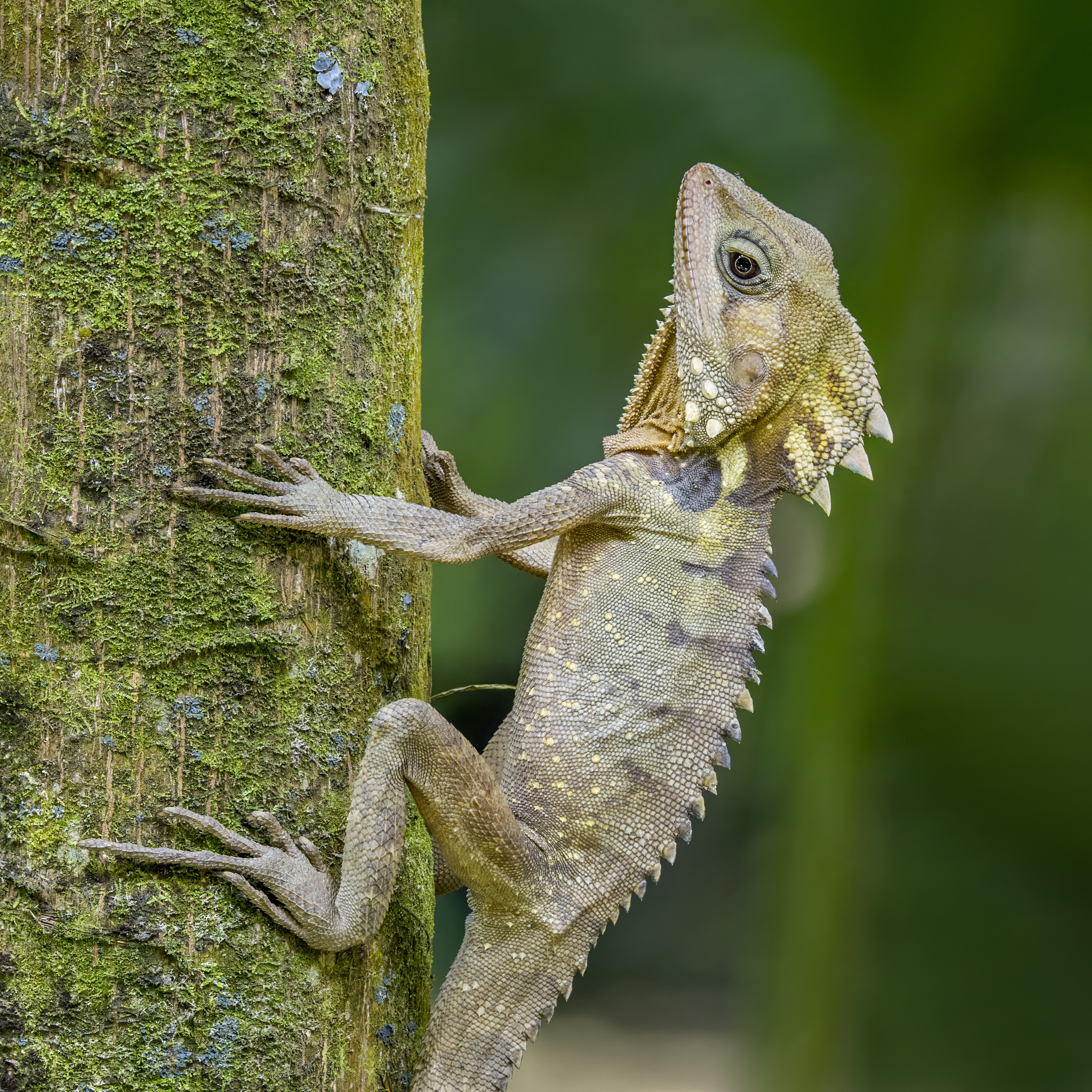

Boyd's forest dragon (Lophosaurus boydii) is a species of arboreal lizard in the family Agamidae. The species is native to rainforests and their margins in the Wet Tropics region of northern Queensland, Australia. It is the larger of the two species of Lophosaurus found in Australia. Another species, the southern angle-headed dragon, L. spinipes, is found in southern Queensland and northern New South Wales.

== Etymology ==
The generic name Lophosaurus stands for "crested lizard", from the Greek lophos for "crest", and saurus for "lizard". The specific name, boydii, is a reference to English-born John Archibald Boyd (1846–1926), who lived in Fiji from 1865 to 1882 and then on a sugar plantation at Ingham, Queensland, and collected specimens for the Australian Museum. The binomial authority is William John Macleay, who provided the original description of the species in 1884. Additionally, the Kuku Yalanji people of North Queensland named this lizard "Jalbil" which refers not only to this species, but also to the mythological creature who split Snapper Island away from the mainland.

== Geographic range and habitat ==
The species Lophosaurus boydii is restricted to rainforests and their margins in northern Queensland, Australia, from just north of Townsville to near Cooktown. It is found in both upland and lowland rainforest, and is often seen around Lake Eacham (Yidyam) and Lake Barrine, and in parts of Malanda Falls Conservation Park and at Mossman Gorge.

It is recorded using tree-hollows.

== Description ==
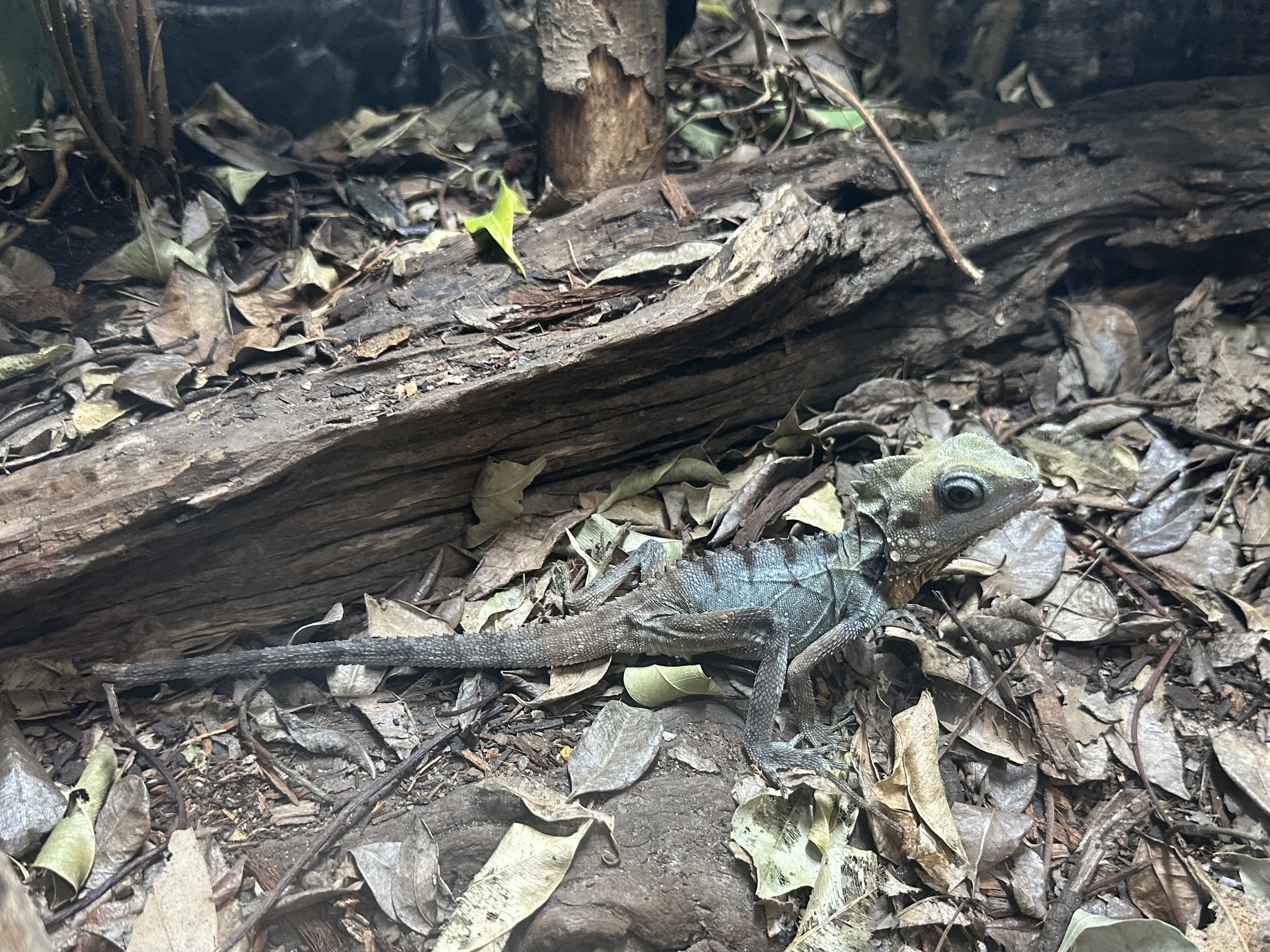
Boyd's forest dragon (Lophosaurus boydii)

Boyd's forest dragon is generally brown or grey above, with some individuals having a green flush. The body is laterally compressed. It has very enlarged cheek scales, a prominent nuchal crest, and a yellow dewlap under the chin that is edged with enlarged spines. The tympanum is large and superficial. A dorsal crest, discontinuous with the nuchal crest, consisting of enlarged, hardened and pointed scales, runs down to the base of the tail.

Adults are sexually dimorphic, with males larger than females and having larger, blockier heads. Adult males grow to an average body length (snout-vent length) of about 160 mm (6.3 in), with the tail adding another 325 mm (12.8 in); average body length for adult females is about 140 mm (5.5 in) and tail length is about 280 mm (11 in). Average body mass for adult males is about 150 g (5.3 oz), and for females is about 100 g (3.5 oz).

== Behavior ==
Boyd's forest dragon spends the majority of its time perched on the trunks of trees, usually at around head height, although daily movements can exceed 100 m (330 ft) on the ground. When approached, it will usually move around to the opposite side of the tree, keeping the trunk between it and its harasser.

Unlike most other lizards, Boyd's forest dragon does not bask in the sun, instead letting its body temperature fluctuate with air temperature (thermoconforming rather than thermoregulating). The one possible exception to this general rule is gravid (pregnant) females, which are often observed sitting on or beside forest roads and exhibit elevated body temperatures.

Boyd's forest dragon typically commences activity at dawn and ceases activity at dusk, remaining active even when it rains. Activity is highly seasonal, all but ceasing during the cooler months, when lizards typically move into the rainforest canopy.

Both males and females appear to be territorial, with males defending an area of around 1,000 square metres (0.247 acres). Female territories are smaller, with male territories often containing the territories of more than one female.

Hatchlings, juveniles and smaller adults can often be found sleeping at night at the ends of tree branches with the head pointing back towards the trunk.

== Diet ==
Boyd's forest dragon is a sit-and-wait predator, catching prey that it spies from its perch, although once on the ground, it will frequently move over a wider area, catching prey as it goes. Its diet consists primarily of invertebrates, with earthworms making up a relatively high proportion. Small fruits and vertebrates are also occasionally consumed.

== Reproduction ==
Reproduction in Lophosaurus boydii is via eggs, with clutch sizes varying from one to six eggs. Eggs are about 30 mm (1.2 in) long and 15 mm (0.59 in) wide, and weigh about 3–4.5 g (0.11–0.16 oz). Egg size and weight are both higher in upland populations. Females in lowland populations may lay more than one clutch in a season, but clutch sizes are typically smaller than those laid by upland females. The eggs are laid in shallow nests, often in rainforest clearings—both natural and man-made (the verges of roads are particularly popular). The eggs take about 100 days to incubate.

Sexual maturity is achieved in around one to two years in lowland populations but probably takes at least a year longer in upland populations.

== Predators ==
Known predators of juvenile and adult Boyd's forest dragon include grey goshawks and feral pigs. Slaty-grey snakes (Stegonotus cucullatus) have also been known to eat forest dragon eggs.

== Parasites ==
Small orange mites are commonly found on the dewlap and in the groin areas of the legs of Boyd's forest dragon.
