= Hypsilurus schultzewestrumi =

Conservation status
- Least Concern (IUCN 3.1)

Scientific classification
- Kingdom: Animalia
- Phylum: Chordata
- Class: Reptilia
- Order: Squamata
- Suborder: Iguania
- Family: Agamidae
- Genus: Hypsilurus
- Species: H. schultzewestrumi

Binomial name
- Hypsilurus schultzewestrumi (Urban, 1999)

Species of lizard

Hypsilurus schultzewestrumi is a species of agama found in Papua New Guinea.
