= Mount Hypipamee Crater =

Gigantic diatreme in Australia

Coordinates: 17°25′33″S 145°29′10″E

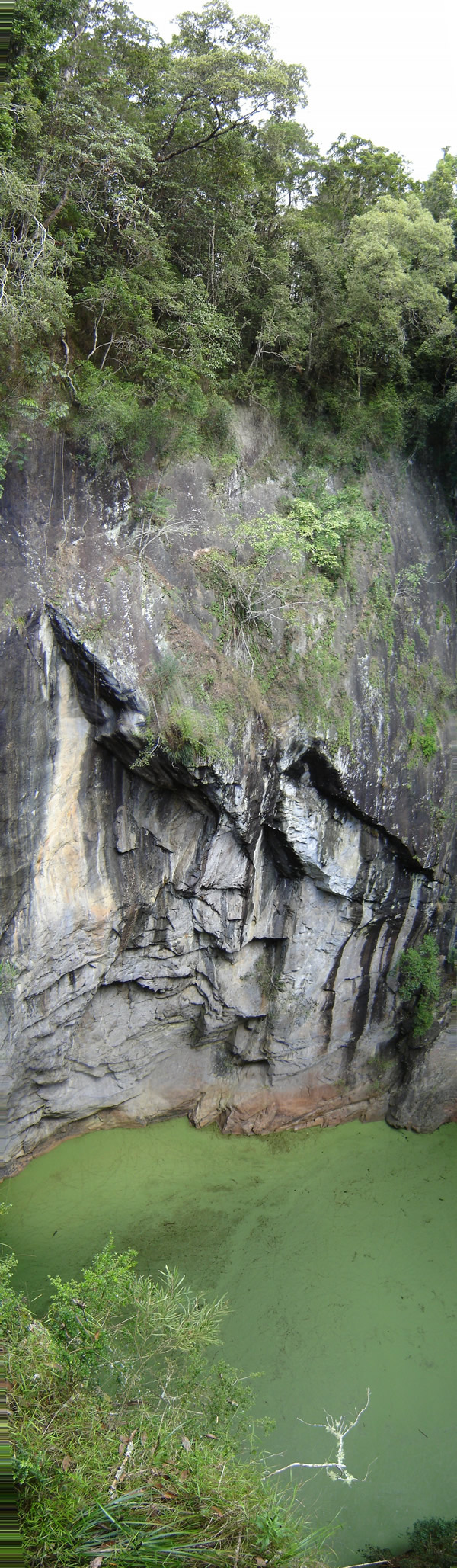
The Mount Hypipamee Crater on the Atherton Tablelands

The Mount Hypipamee Crater, also known as The Crater, is a huge diatreme located south-east of Herberton on the Atherton Tableland in Far North Queensland, Australia. It is 61 metres in diameter and 82 metres deep.

It has been part of Indigenous culture and lore from pre-colonial days. Colonists encountered it by accident when in 1879 Weate and party nearly fell into it. They were heading towards the Mulgrave River on a five-month gold prospecting expedition.

The national park was established in 1908 under the sponsorship of a Mr. Ringrose of Herberton. There was a debate at the "crater trust" meetings during the 1930s as to what to call it; the "Herberton Crater" was one suggestion but it was decided to call it by the traditional Dyrbal name, Mount Hypipamee. A request was written to Ernest Gribble of Palm Island to find the origin of the name. The name Hypipamee is a corruption of the Aboriginal word, nabbanabbamee, which is connected with a legend of two young men who cut down a sacred candlenut tree, only to be swallowed up by a large hole in the earth, the crater.

The water surface is covered with duck weed. Dinner Falls at the head of the upper Barron River gorge is also part of this park.

It was once thought that the crater, Lake Eacham and Lake Barrine were all connected underground with water tunnels, but this is incorrect. Local legend once said that an Aboriginal woman once fell over the side into the crater and later surfaced in Lake Eacham.

== See also ==
- List of volcanoes in Australia
