= Hypsilurus bruijnii =

Conservation status
- Data Deficient (IUCN 3.1)

Scientific classification
- Kingdom: Animalia
- Phylum: Chordata
- Class: Reptilia
- Order: Squamata
- Suborder: Iguania
- Family: Agamidae
- Genus: Hypsilurus
- Species: H. bruijnii

Binomial name
- Hypsilurus bruijnii (W. Peters & Doria, 1878)
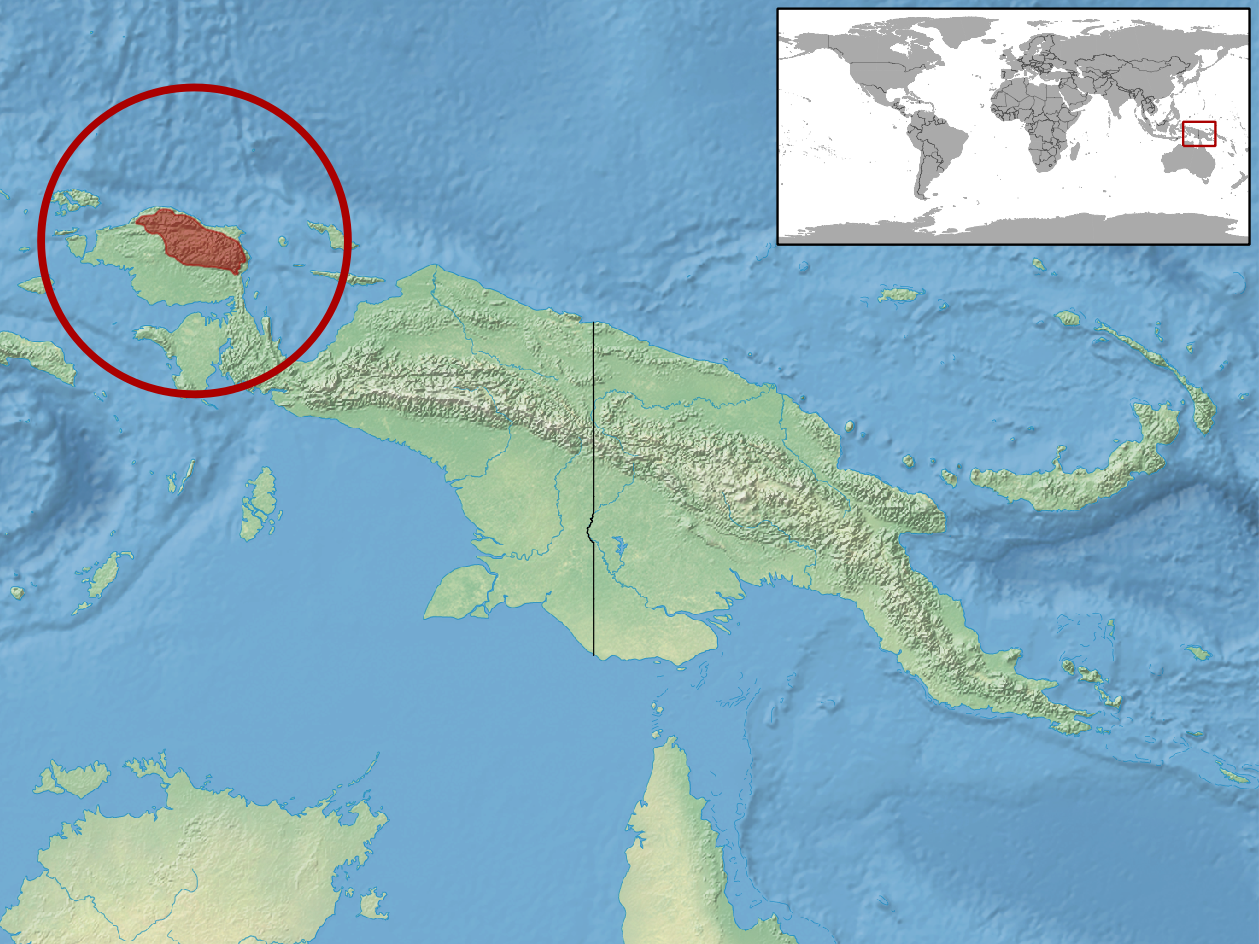

Synonyms
- Gonyocephalus (Hypsilurus) bruijnii W. Peters & Doria, 1878; Gonyocephalus bruijnii — Boulenger, 1885; Hypsilurus bruijnii — Bauer, R. Günther & Klipfel, 1999

Species of lizard

Hypsilurus bruijnii, also known commonly as the Bruijn forest dragon, the Bruijni forest dragon, and Bruijn's forest dragon, is a species of lizard in the family Agamidae. The species is native to Indonesia and Papua New Guinea.

== Etymology ==
The specific name, bruijnii, is in honor of Dutch naturalist Anton August Bruijn.

== Habitat ==
The natural habitat of H. bruijnii is rainforest.

== Description ==
Medium-sized for its genus, H. bruijnii may attain a snout-to-vent length (SVL) of 13 cm (5.1 in), with a tail length of 45 cm (18 in).

== Reproduction ==
H. bruijnii is oviparous.
