= Hypsilurus schoedei =

Conservation status
- Least Concern (IUCN 3.1)

Scientific classification
- Kingdom: Animalia
- Phylum: Chordata
- Class: Reptilia
- Order: Squamata
- Suborder: Iguania
- Family: Agamidae
- Genus: Hypsilurus
- Species: H. schoedei

Binomial name
- Hypsilurus schoedei (Vogt, 1932)

Species of lizard

Hypsilurus schoedei, Vogt's forest dragon, is a species of agama found in Papua New Guinea.
