= Hypsilurus godeffroyi =

Conservation status
- Data Deficient (IUCN 3.1)

Scientific classification
- Kingdom: Animalia
- Phylum: Chordata
- Class: Reptilia
- Order: Squamata
- Suborder: Iguania
- Family: Agamidae
- Genus: Hypsilurus
- Species: H. godeffroyi

Binomial name
- Hypsilurus godeffroyi (W. Peters, 1867)

Synonyms
- Lophura (Hypsilurus) godeffroyi W. Peters, 1867; Gonyocephalus macrolepis W. Peters, 1872; Tiaris longii Macleay, 1878; Gonyocephalus godeffroyi — Boulenger, 1885; Hypsilurus godeffroyi — Manthey & Schuster, 1999

Species of lizard

Hypsilurus godeffroyi, also known commonly as the angle-headed lizard, the northern forest dragon, and the Palau tree dragon, is a species of lizard in the family Agamidae. The species is native to Palau and Papua New Guinea.

== Etymology ==
The specific name, godeffroyi, is in honor of German amateur ornithologist Johann Cesar Godeffroy.

== Behavior ==
H. godeffroyi is arboreal.

== Reproduction ==
H. godeffroyi is oviparous.
