= Hypsilurus longi =

Conservation status
- Least Concern (IUCN 3.1)

Scientific classification
- Kingdom: Animalia
- Phylum: Chordata
- Class: Reptilia
- Order: Squamata
- Suborder: Iguania
- Family: Agamidae
- Genus: Hypsilurus
- Species: H. longi

Binomial name
- Hypsilurus longi (Macleay, 1877)

Synonyms
- Tiaris Longii Macleay, 1877; Hypsilurus longii (Macleay, 1877)

Species of lizard

Hypsilurus longi, also known commonly as Long's forest dragon, is a species of lizard in the subfamily Amphibolurinae of the family Agamidae. The species is native to Papua New Guinea.

== Etymology ==
The specific name, longi, is in honor of Mark H. Long who donated to Macleay the specimen which became the holotype.

== Description ==
H. longi is large for its genus, and has a long tail. It may attain a snout-to-vent length (SVL) of 23.5 cm (9.3 in), and a tail length three times SVL.

== Habitat ==
The preferred natural habitat of H. longi is forest, at altitudes from sea level to 500 m (1,600 ft).

== Reproduction ==
H. longi is oviparous.
