= Hypsilurus spinosus =

Scientific classification
- Domain: Eukaryota
- Kingdom: Animalia
- Phylum: Chordata
- Class: Reptilia
- Order: Squamata
- Suborder: Iguania
- Family: Agamidae
- Genus: Hypsilurus
- Species: H. spinosus

Binomial name
- Hypsilurus spinosus Duméril & Bibron, 1851

Species of lizard

Hypsilurus spinosus is a species of agama found in Indonesia.
