= Hypsilurus geelvinkianus =

Conservation status
- Least Concern (IUCN 3.1)

Scientific classification
- Kingdom: Animalia
- Phylum: Chordata
- Class: Reptilia
- Order: Squamata
- Suborder: Iguania
- Family: Agamidae
- Genus: Hypsilurus
- Species: H. geelvinkianus

Binomial name
- Hypsilurus geelvinkianus (Peters & Doria, 1878)

Species of lizard

Hypsilurus geelvinkianus, the New Guinea forest dragon, is a species of agama found in Indonesia and Papua New Guinea.
