= Hypsilurus modestus =

Conservation status
- Least Concern (IUCN 3.1)

Scientific classification
- Kingdom: Animalia
- Phylum: Chordata
- Class: Reptilia
- Order: Squamata
- Suborder: Iguania
- Family: Agamidae
- Genus: Hypsilurus
- Species: H. modestus

Binomial name
- Hypsilurus modestus (Meyer, 1874)

Species of lizard

Hypsilurus modestus, the modest forest dragon, is a species of agama found in Indonesia and Papua New Guinea.
