= Hypsilurus magnus =

Conservation status
- Least Concern (IUCN 3.1)

Scientific classification
- Kingdom: Animalia
- Phylum: Chordata
- Class: Reptilia
- Order: Squamata
- Suborder: Iguania
- Family: Agamidae
- Genus: Hypsilurus
- Species: H. magnus

Binomial name
- Hypsilurus magnus Manthey & Denzer, 2006

Species of lizard

Hypsilurus magnus is a species of agama found in Indonesia and Papua New Guinea.
