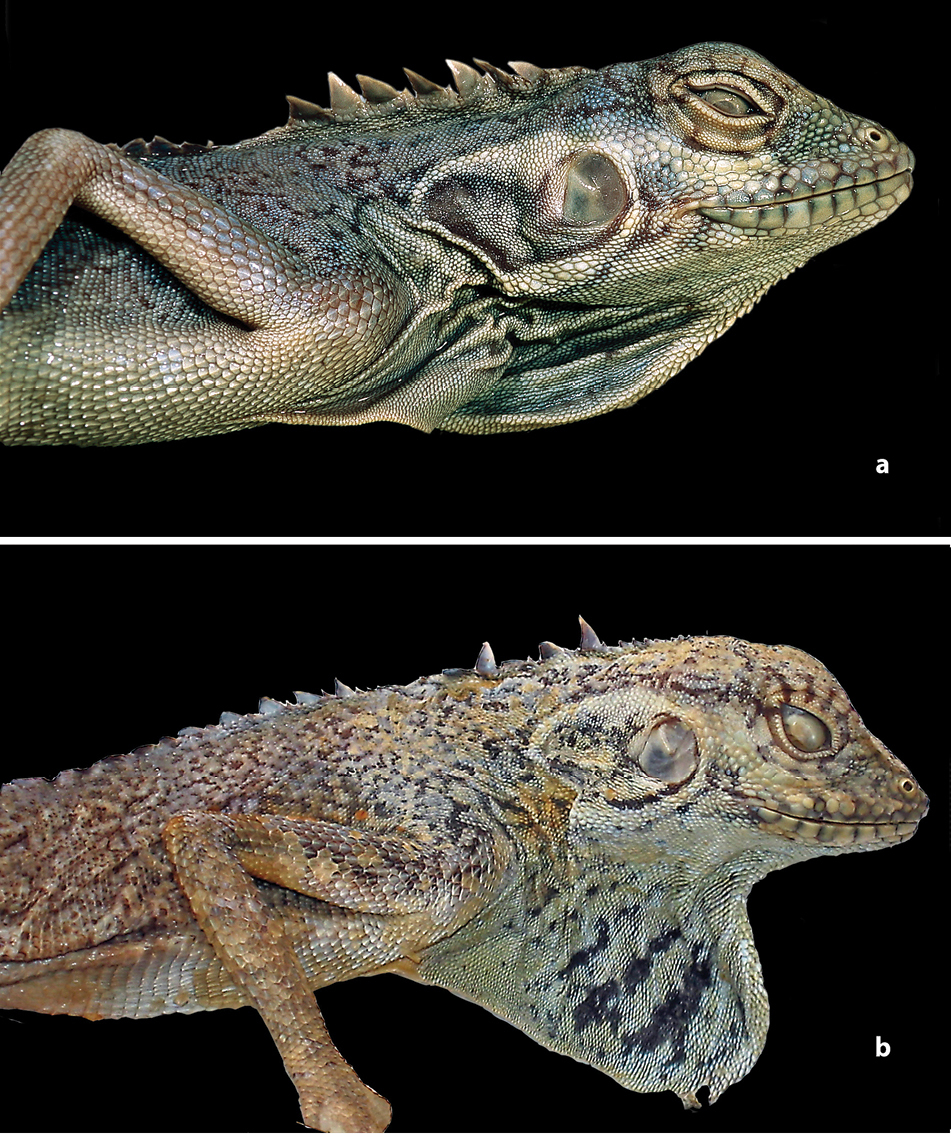

Conservation status
- Least Concern (IUCN 3.1)

Scientific classification
- Kingdom: Animalia
- Phylum: Chordata
- Class: Reptilia
- Order: Squamata
- Suborder: Iguania
- Family: Agamidae
- Genus: Hypsilurus
- Species: H. auritus

Binomial name
- Hypsilurus auritus (Meyer, 1874)

= Hypsilurus auritus =

Species of lizard

Hypsilurus auritus is a species of agama found in Indonesia and Papua New Guinea. It is also distributed along adjacent islands to Papua New Guinea (mostly along southern coasts). Morphological Characteristics of this organism are that tey have 1 scale between nasal and first supralabial

The main characteristic of this species is their color – the dorsal side should display colors of green and brown with/or turquoise shadings.

- Hypsilurus auritus should not be confused with the species Lophyrus spinosus (similar organisms but very distinct morphological characteristics in comparison)

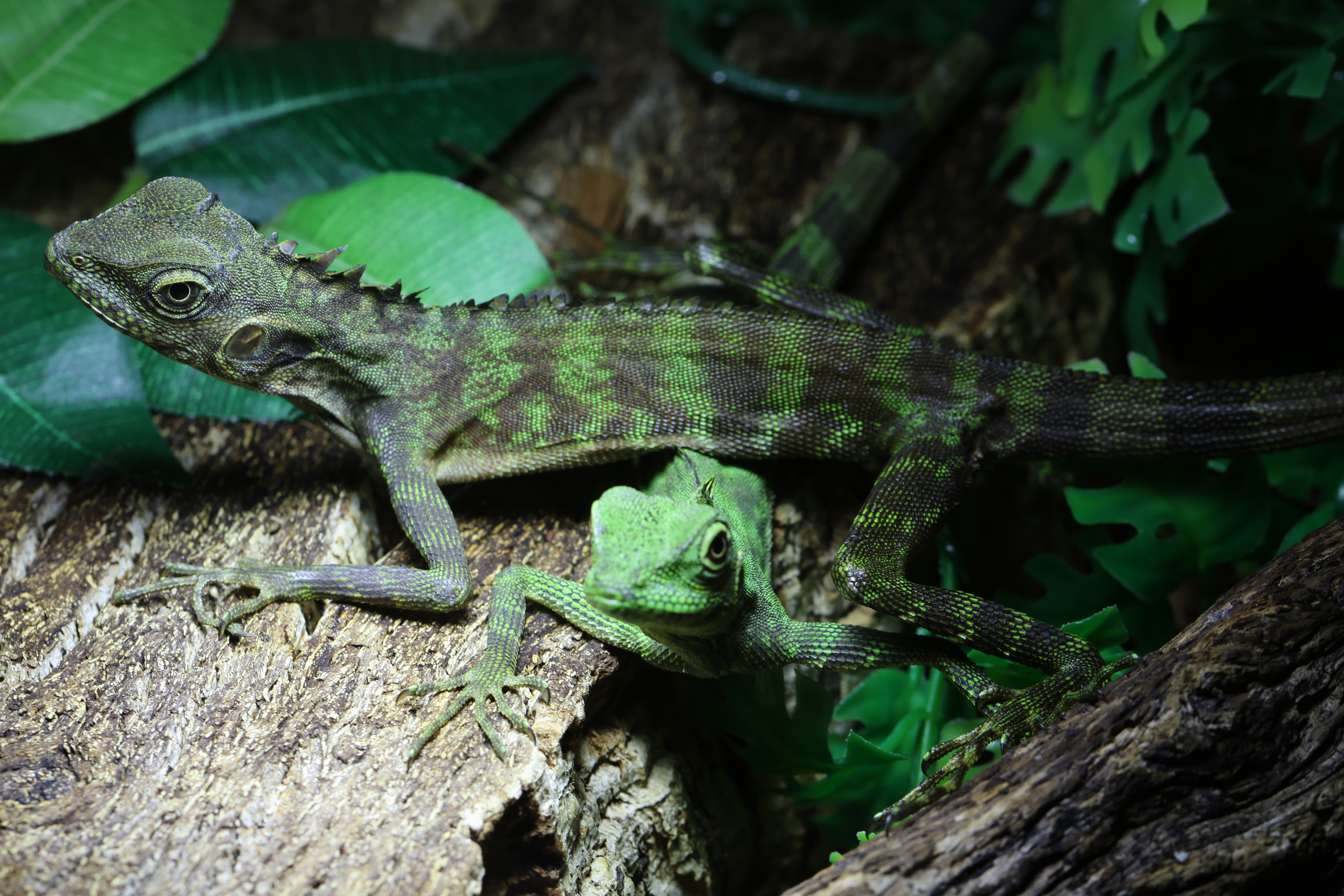
Hypsilurus auritus "Indonésie" - Captivity
