= Hypsilurus tenuicephalus =

Conservation status
- Data Deficient (IUCN 3.1)

Scientific classification
- Kingdom: Animalia
- Phylum: Chordata
- Class: Reptilia
- Order: Squamata
- Suborder: Iguania
- Family: Agamidae
- Genus: Hypsilurus
- Species: H. tenuicephalus

Binomial name
- Hypsilurus tenuicephalus Manthey & Denzer, 2006

Species of lizard

Hypsilurus tenuicephalus is a species of agama found in Indonesia.
