= Hypsilurus capreolatus =

Scientific classification
- Kingdom: Animalia
- Phylum: Chordata
- Class: Reptilia
- Order: Squamata
- Suborder: Iguania
- Family: Agamidae
- Genus: Hypsilurus
- Species: H. capreolatus

Binomial name
- Hypsilurus capreolatus Kraus & Myers, 2012

Species of lizard

Hypsilurus capreolatus is a species of agama found in Papua New Guinea.
