= Hypsilurus hikidanus =

Conservation status
- Least Concern (IUCN 3.1)

Scientific classification
- Kingdom: Animalia
- Phylum: Chordata
- Class: Reptilia
- Order: Squamata
- Suborder: Iguania
- Family: Agamidae
- Genus: Hypsilurus
- Species: H. hikidanus

Binomial name
- Hypsilurus hikidanus Manthey & Denzer, 2006

Species of lizard

Hypsilurus hikidanus is a species of lizard in the family Agamidae. The species is native to the island of New Guinea.

== Etymology ==
The specific name, hikidanus, is in honor of Japanese herpetologist Tsutomu Hikida.

== Habitat ==
The preferred natural habitat of H. hikidanus is forest.

== Description ==
H. hikidanus is medium-sized for its genus and has a very long tail. Males may attain a snout-to-vent length (SVL) of about 16 cm (6.3 in), and females are about 25% shorter in SVL. The tail is about three times SVL.

== Reproduction ==
H. hikidanus is oviparous.
