= Atherton Tableland =

Fertile plateau in northern Queensland, Australia

- Region
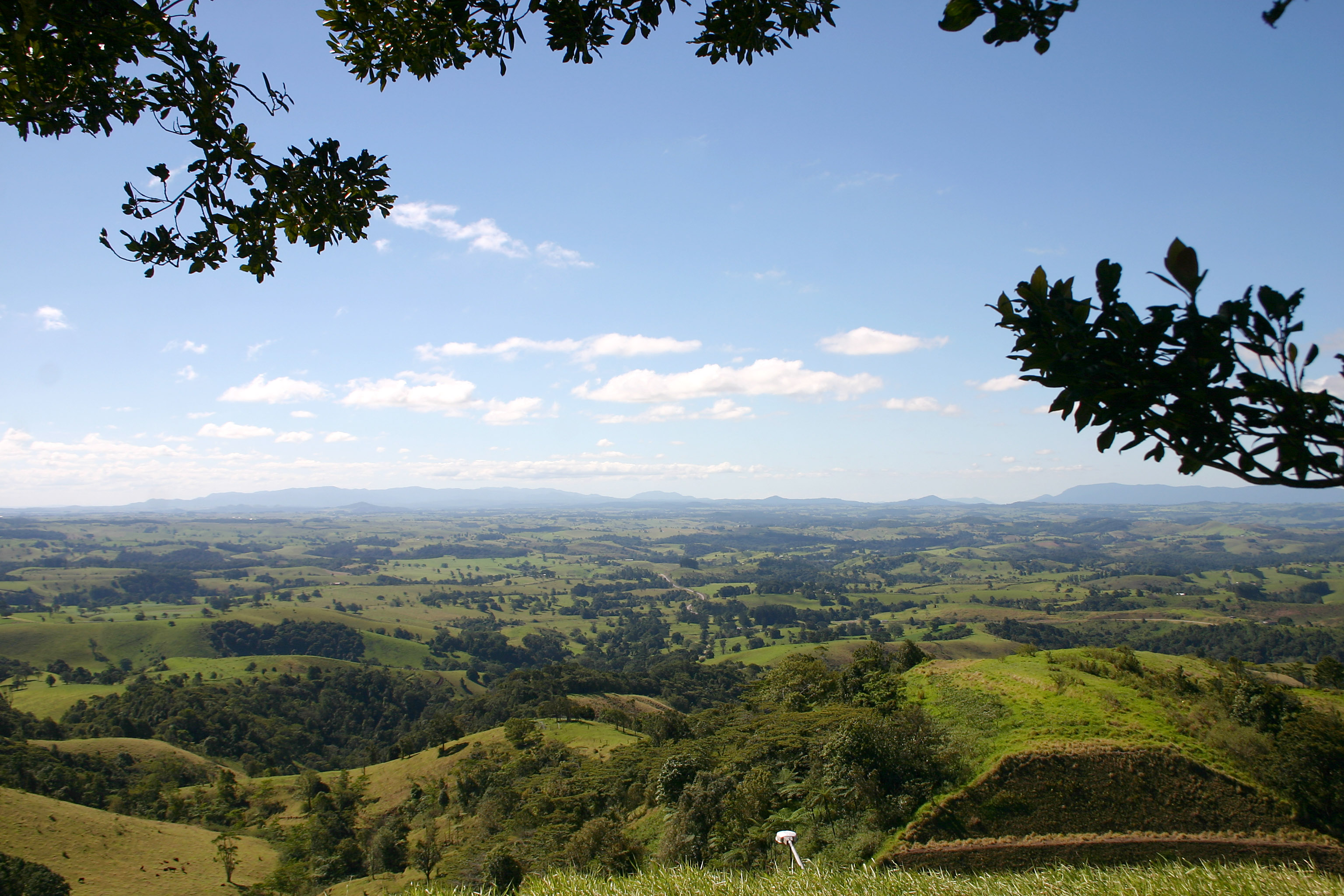
- View from McHugh Lookout
- Country: Australia
- State: Queensland
- LGA: Tablelands Regional Council
- Location: 50 km (31 mi) SW of Cairns

Government
  - State electorate: Hill
  - Federal division: Kennedy

Population
  - Total: 26,244 (2021 census)

The Atherton Tableland is a fertile plateau, which is part of the Great Dividing Range in Queensland, Australia. It has very deep, rich basaltic soils and the main industry is agriculture. The principal river flowing across the plateau is the Barron River, which was dammed to form the irrigation reservoir named Lake Tinaroo. Unlike many other rural areas, the Tablelands is experiencing a significant growth in population.

== Physiography ==
This area is a distinct physiographic section of the larger North Queensland Highlands province, which in turn is part of the larger East Australian Cordillera physiographic division. South of the Tablelands is the Bellenden Ker Range.

=== Geological history ===
Around 100 million years ago, the eastern edge of the Australian continent extended much further to the east, before tectonic forces fractured the eastern margin, pulling it apart. At the same time, slowly rising mantle material caused a doming up of the continental crust. As the eastern part of the continent broke away, it gradually sank below sea level. Since that time, the uplifted western portion has been slowly eroding westwards, creating the abrupt Great Escarpment, which separates the coastal plain to the east from the uplifted tablelands to the west.

Between 4 million to less than 10,000 years ago, a series of volcanic eruptions occurred over the Atherton Tableland. The oldest eruptions created large, gently sloping 'shield volcanoes' that produced extensive basalt flows. These flows filled the pre-existing valleys, producing a relatively flat tableland surface, instead of the more dissected landscape that existed previously. Around one million years ago, the style of eruption changed. The lavas became more gas-charged, throwing fragmented lava into the air, which built the numerous, small scoria cones such as the Seven Sisters, near Yungaburra. Some of the rising magma interacted with groundwater, producing violent eruptions that led to the formation of maar volcanoes, such as Lake Eacham and Lake Barrine. Although all the volcanoes in the Atherton Basalt Province are regarded as being extinct and volcanism has been waning over time, given the relatively recent activity, it is possible that further eruptions could occur in the future.

== History ==
The Atherton Tableland has a long history of Indigenous occupation. Aspects of traditional Aboriginal land use and culture have been documented from the period of first contact to present. Aboriginal people with ties to the region seek to maintain their culture today, despite a long period of forced removal from their lands following European occupation in the late 19th-early 20th century.

Yidinji (also known as Yidinj, Yidiny, and Idindji) is a local Australian Aboriginal language. Its traditional region is within the local government areas of Cairns Region and Tablelands Region, in such localities as Cairns, Gordonvale, and the Mulgrave River, and the southern part of the Atherton Tableland including Atherton and Kairi.

Dyirbal (also known as Djirbal) is a language of Far North Queensland, particularly the area around Tully and Tully River Catchment extending to the Atherton Tablelands. The Dyirbal language region includes the landscape within the local government boundaries of Cassowary Coast Regional Council and Tablelands Regional Council.

The first European exploration of this area was undertaken in 1875 by James Venture Mulligan. Mulligan and his party were led by Aboriginal guides. Mulligan was prospecting for gold, but instead found tin. In 1879, John Atherton and his party settled with their cattle near the town which now bears his name. Atherton Creek is also named after John Atherton.

The town of Herberton was established on 19 April 1880 by John Newell to exploit the tin find, and mining began on 9 May. Later that year, Herberton had a population of 300 men and 27 women. At its apogee, Herberton was the richest tin mining field in Australia, and was home to 17 pubs, 2 local newspapers and a brewery.

In the late 19th century, the Mulligan Highway was built through the hills from Herberton and passed through what is now Main Street, Atherton, before continuing down to Port Douglas. This road was used by the coaches of Cobb and Co to access Western Queensland.

In the Second World War, Australian troops were camped around the district prior to being sent to the front and then again on their return. Many soldiers were interred at the war cemetery in Atherton.

=== Industry ===
The construction of a dray road through the Tableland brought a secondary rush of settlement after the mining rush, this time timber cutters. Redcedar cutters camps were at Rocky Creek, Prior Pocket, Oonda Swamp (Carrington) & Ziggenbein's Pocket. Tree species used for the timber industry include red cedar, kauri, maple, black bean, walnut, white beech and red tulip oak.

As part of the mining and timber booms a large population of Chinese-Australians moved into the Atherton Tableland region. In addition to mining and timber, the Chinese population took up agriculture. They grew fruit and vegetable crops and were some of the first to grow maize in north Queensland. As the community grew they also built a temple to worship at, the Hou Wang Temple. The temple remains standing today and was added to the Queensland State Heritage Register in 1992.

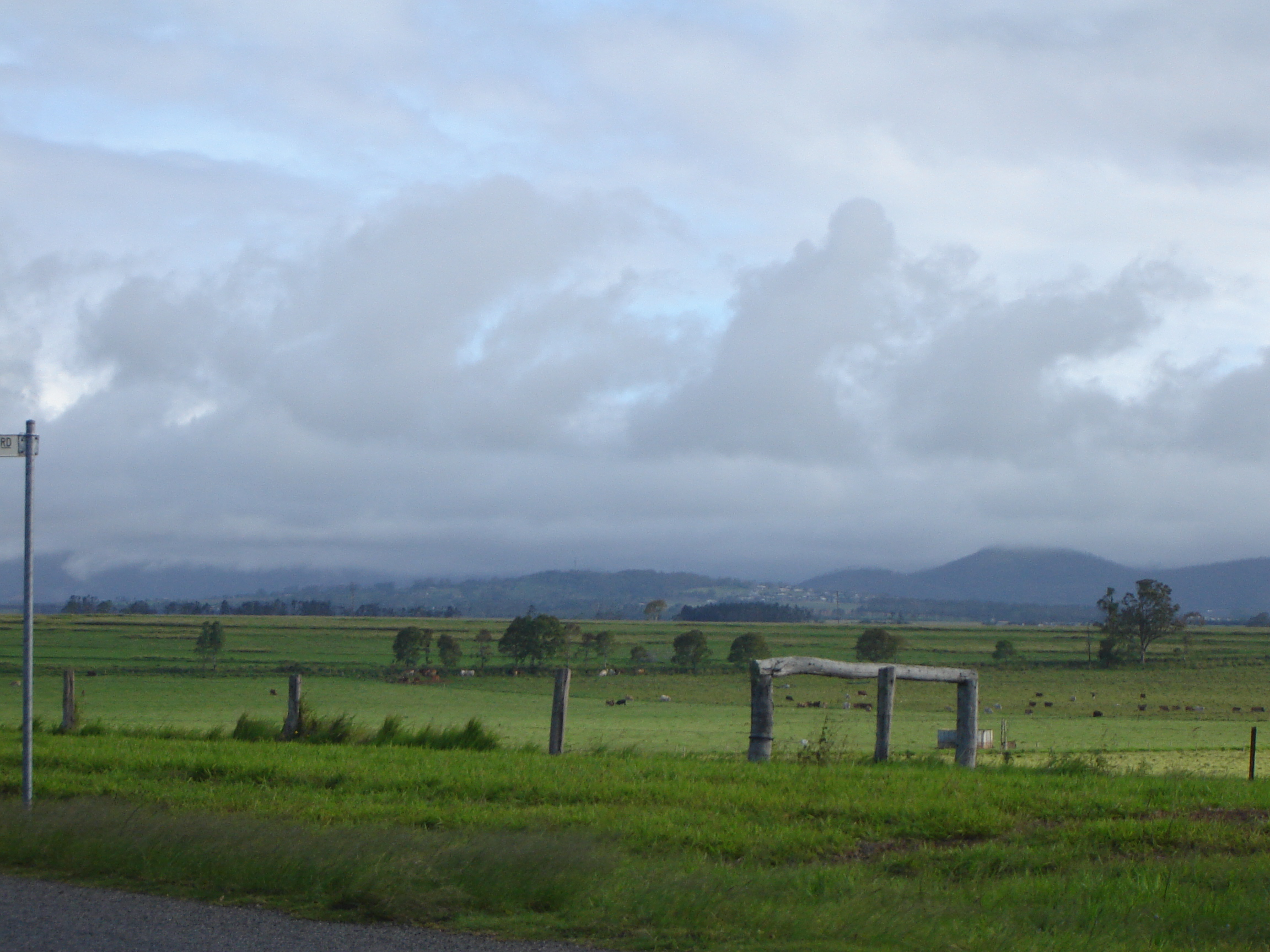
Atherton Tableland

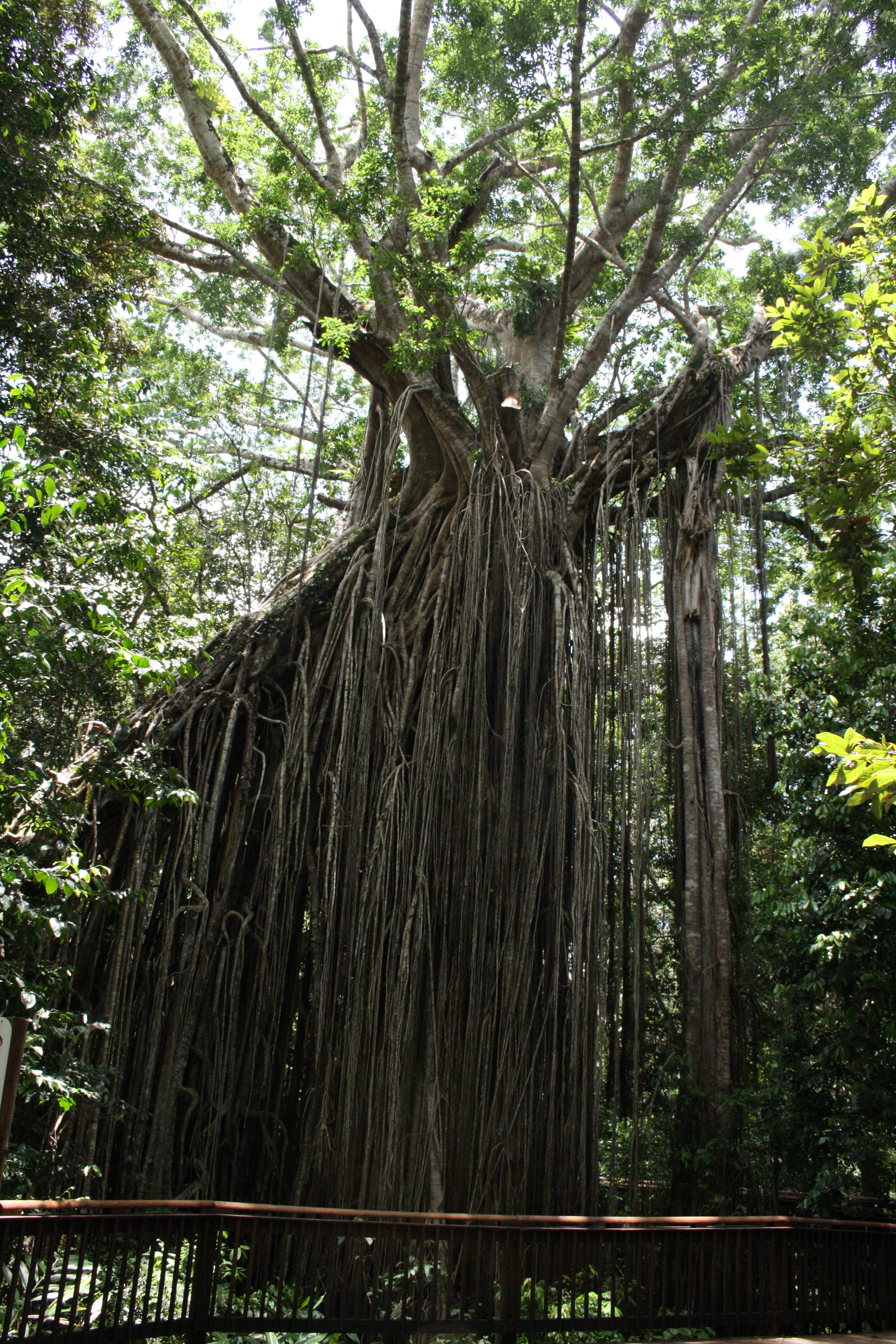
Curtain Fig Tree, Atherton Tableland

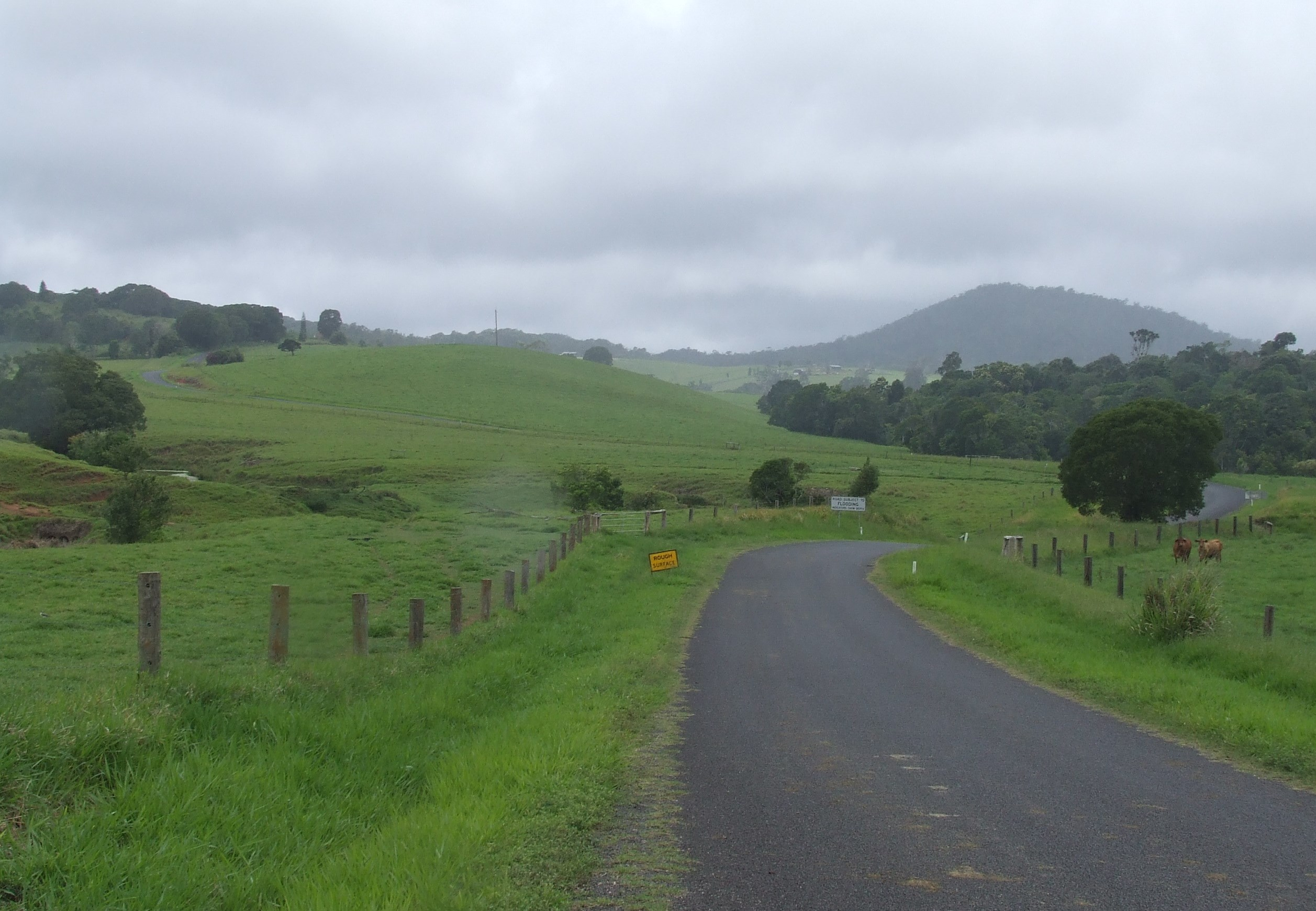
Country road to the Cathedral Fig Tree in the Atherton Tableland

Agriculture is now the largest industry in the Tablelands Regional Council area. Crops grown in and around Atherton include banana, sugarcane, corn/maize, avocados, strawberries, macadamia nuts and mangoes and citrus. Tobacco was also grown until October 2006 when it was ended by a Government buyout. Dairying, grazing and poultry are also present on the Tableland. Dairying was once the backbone of local industry in the region, with hundreds of dairy farms dotting the landscape. The deregulation of the dairy industry in 2000 is blamed for the decline.

=== Tourism ===
Tourism is the second largest economic driver of the Atherton Tablelands economy, with Tinaroo Dam and extensive trail network being the focal point.

== Towns ==
Atherton and Mareeba are the largest towns in the area. Herberton, Kairi, Kuranda, Malanda, Millaa Millaa, Tinaroo, Tolga, Yungaburra, Chillagoe, Walkamin and Ravenshoe are also located on the Atherton Tablelands.

== Environment ==
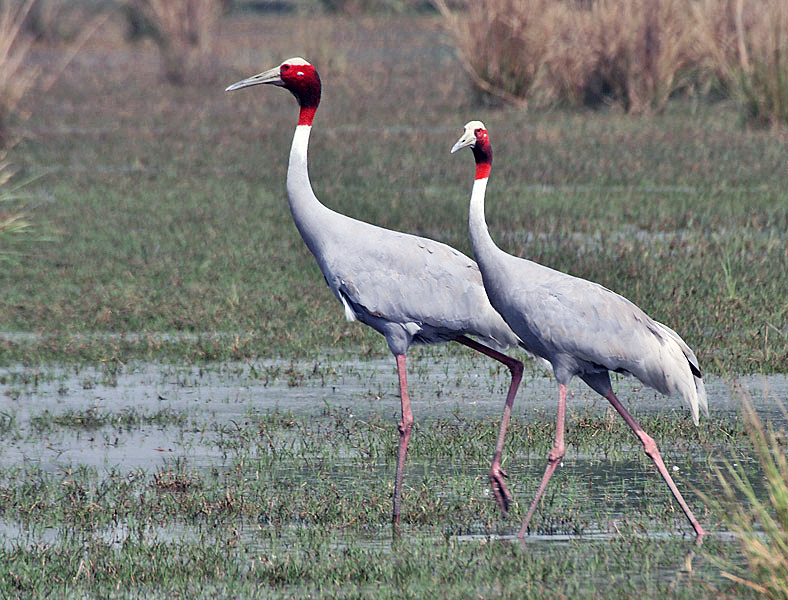
The area supports an important population of sarus cranes

The tableland contains several small remnants of the rainforest which once covered it, many of which are now protected in national parks. It is classified by BirdLife International as one of Australia's Important Bird Areas, supporting over 1% of the world population of the sarus crane and a significant population of the bush stone-curlew. Twelve species of birds are endemic to this area and the mountain ranges immediately south: Atherton scrubwren, Bower's shrikethrush, bridled honeyeater, chowchilla, fernwren, golden bowerbird, grey-headed robin, Macleay's honeyeater, mountain thornbill, pied monarch, tooth-billed bowerbird and Victoria's riflebird.

=== Places of interest ===
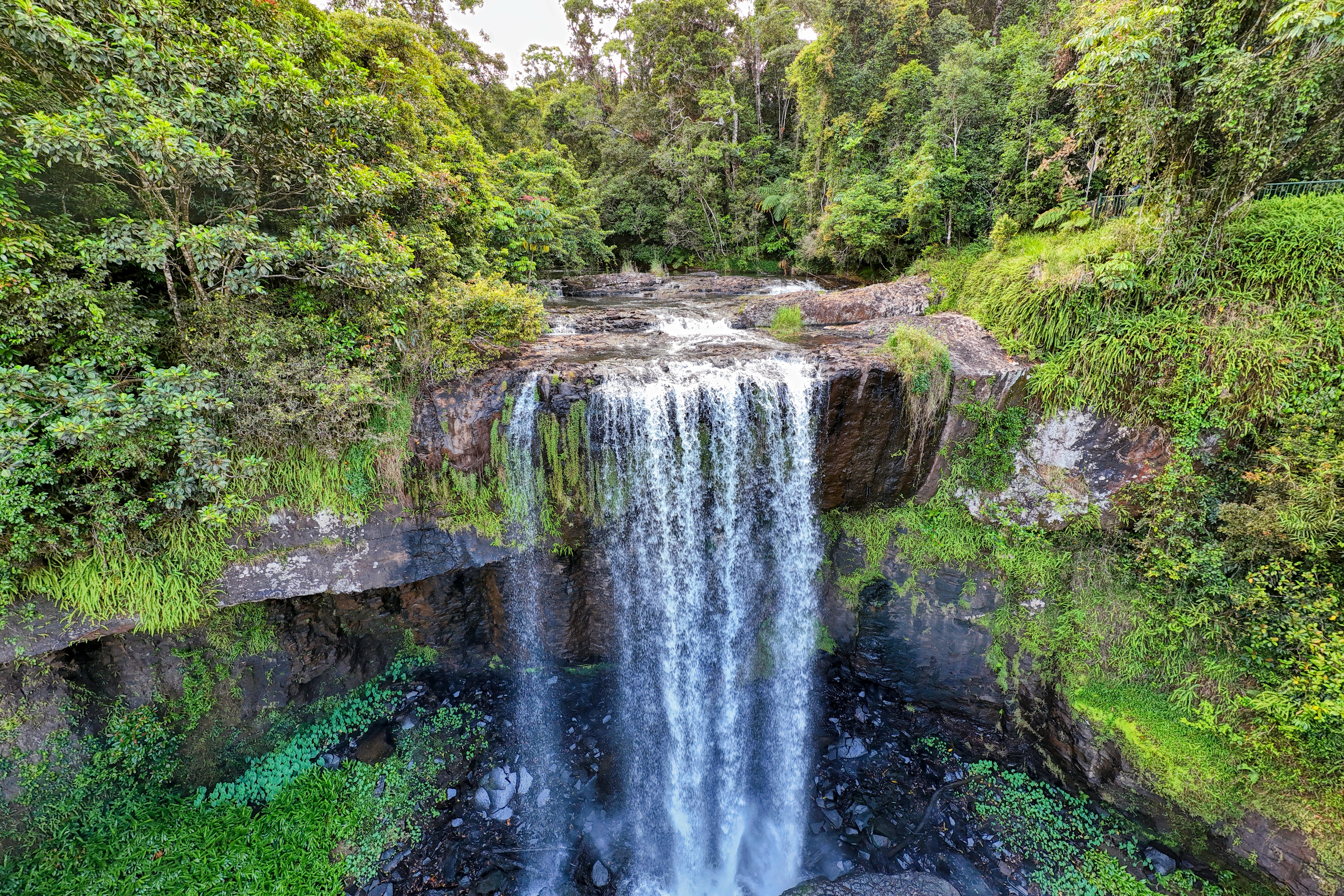
Zillie Falls

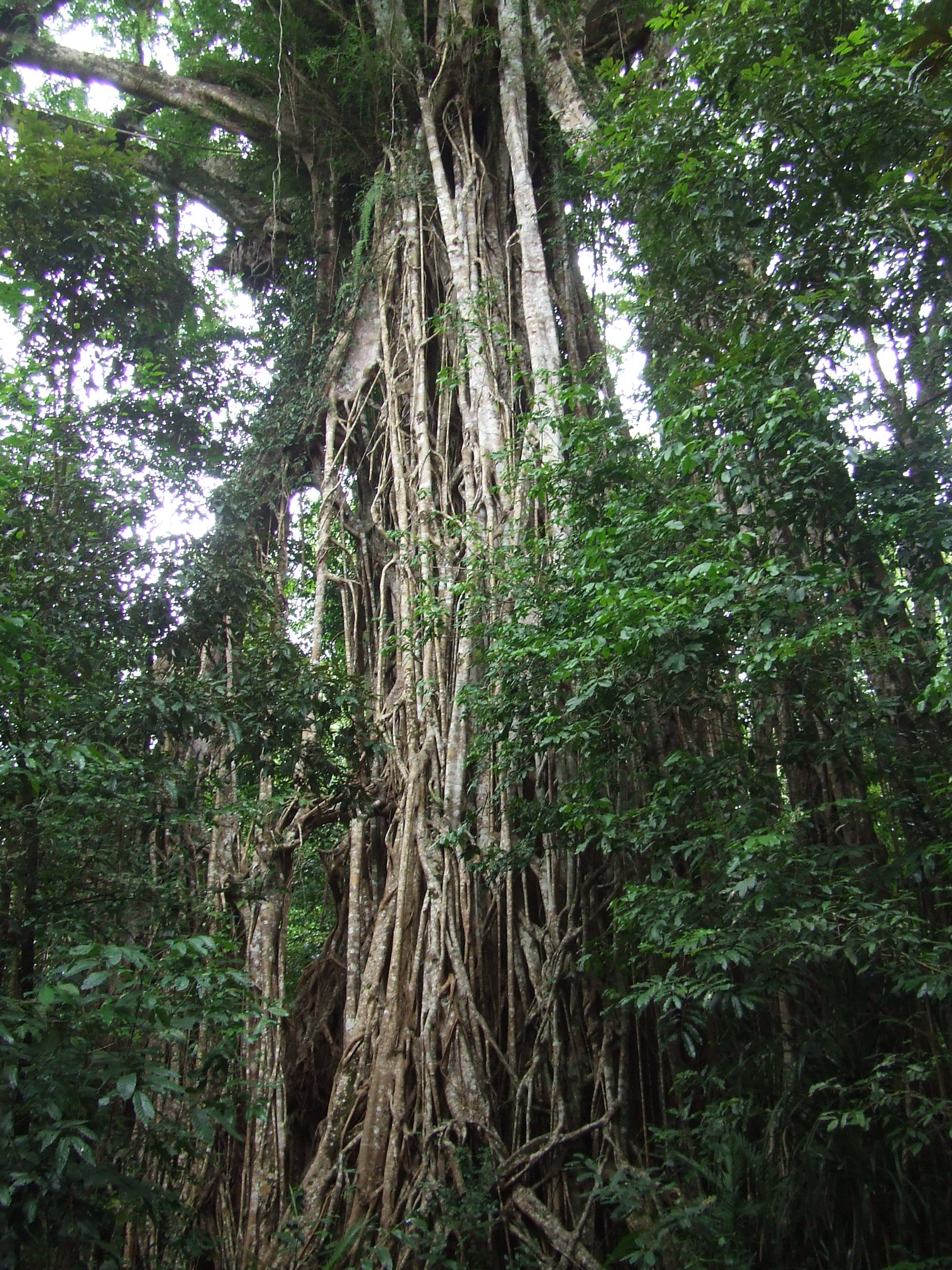
Cathedral Fig Tree near Lake Barrine. Not to be confused with the Curtain Fig Tree at Yungaburra.

- Lake Barrine
- Lake Eacham
- Curtain Fig Tree near Yungaburra.
- Undara Volcanic National Park
- Hann Tableland National Park
- Mount Hypipamee Crater and Dinner Falls
- Herberton, Queensland
- Kuranda
- Chillagoe
- Mareeba
- Atherton

== Notable people ==
- Comedian Sam Campbell was born in Atherton Tableland

== See also ==
- Barkly Tableland
- Regions of Queensland
- Tablelands Region
