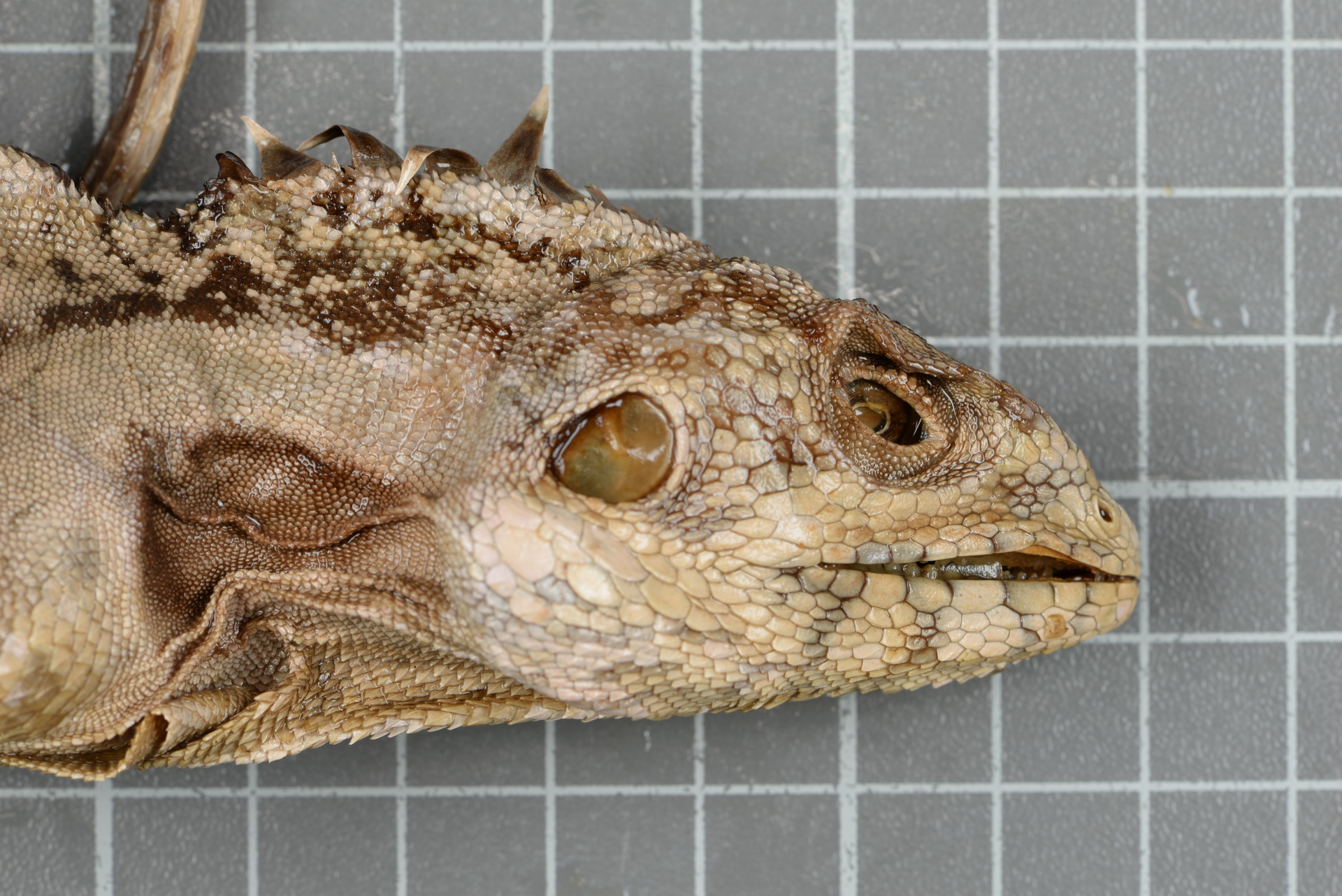

Conservation status
- Least Concern (IUCN 3.1)

Scientific classification
- Kingdom: Animalia
- Phylum: Chordata
- Class: Reptilia
- Order: Squamata
- Suborder: Iguania
- Family: Agamidae
- Genus: Hypsilurus
- Species: H. papuensis

Binomial name
- Hypsilurus papuensis (Macleay, 1877)

= Hypsilurus papuensis =

Species of lizard

Hypsilurus papuensis, the Papua forest dragon, is a species of agama. It is endemic to Papua New Guinea and found in both New Guinean mainland and on the D'Entrecasteaux and Trobriand Islands.

Two subspecies are recognized:

- Hypsilurus papuensis papuensis (Macleay, 1877)
- Hypsilurus papuensis longicauda Manthey and Denzer 2006

Hypsilurus papuensis is a highly arboreal lizard inhabiting both lowland and montane primary rainforest.
