= Hypsilurus binotatus =

Conservation status
- Least Concern (IUCN 3.1)

Scientific classification
- Kingdom: Animalia
- Phylum: Chordata
- Class: Reptilia
- Order: Squamata
- Suborder: Iguania
- Family: Agamidae
- Genus: Hypsilurus
- Species: H. binotatus

Binomial name
- Hypsilurus binotatus (Meyer, 1874)
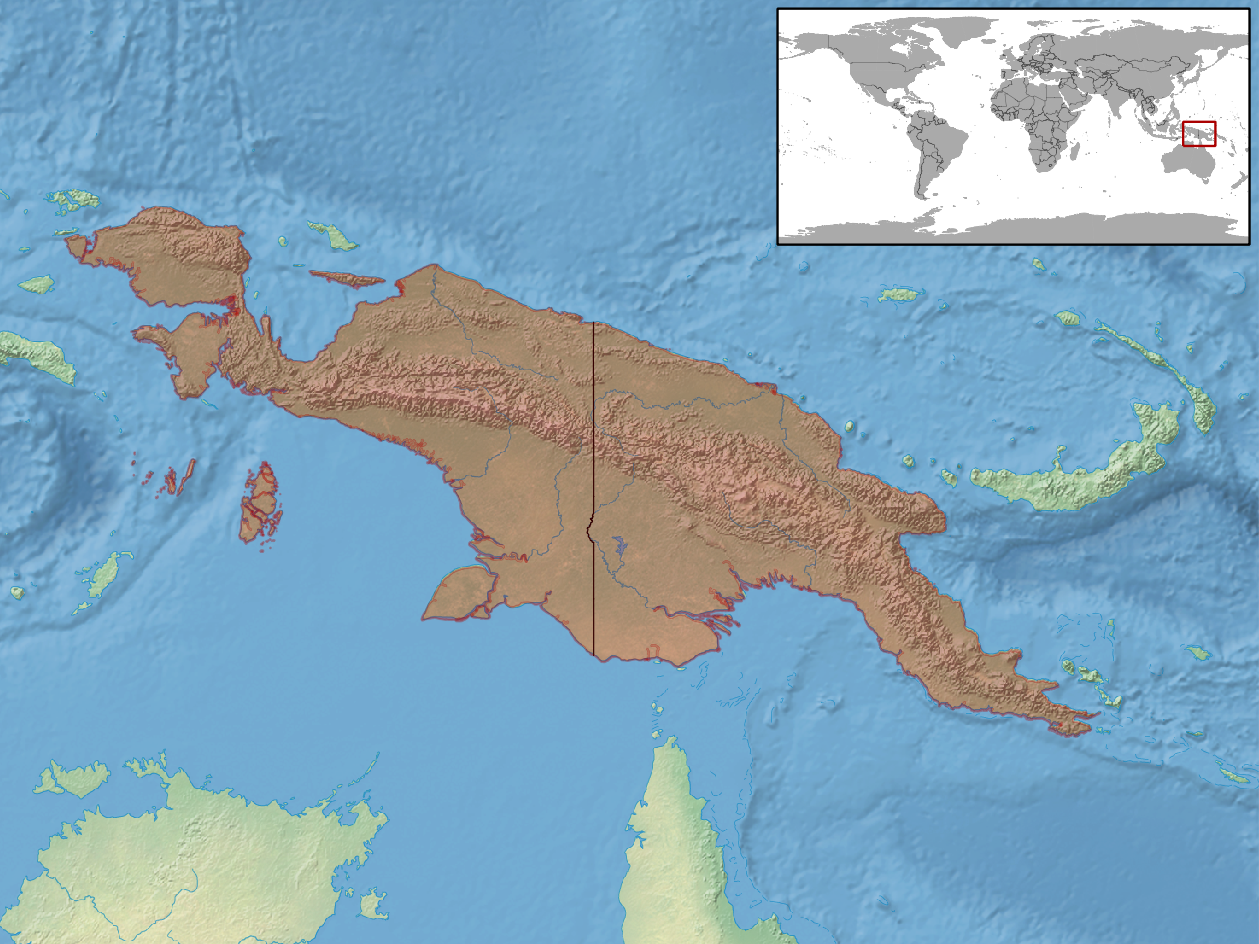

Species of lizard

Hypsilurus binotatus, the two-marked forest dragon, is a species of agama found in Indonesia and Papua New Guinea.
