= Hypsilurus nigrigularis =

Conservation status
- Data Deficient (IUCN 3.1)

Scientific classification
- Kingdom: Animalia
- Phylum: Chordata
- Class: Reptilia
- Order: Squamata
- Suborder: Iguania
- Family: Agamidae
- Genus: Hypsilurus
- Species: H. nigrigularis

Binomial name
- Hypsilurus nigrigularis (Meyer, 1874)

Species of lizard

Hypsilurus nigrigularis is a species of agamid lizard. It is found in New Guinea.

Hypsilurus nigrigularis is hunted by the Kalam people of Papua New Guinea, and its eggs are also consumed. The Kalam consider it to be a totemic animal.

== Names ==
It is known as aypot in the Kalam language of Papua New Guinea.

== Behavior and habitat ==
Hypsilurus nigrigularis is an arboreal frugivorous agamid that feeds on the fruits of Wendlandia paniculata, Heptapleurum sp., Evodia sp., Macaranga sp., Rubus spp., and other species.
