= Hypsilurus macrolepis =

Conservation status
- Near Threatened (IUCN 3.1)

Scientific classification
- Kingdom: Animalia
- Phylum: Chordata
- Class: Reptilia
- Order: Squamata
- Suborder: Iguania
- Family: Agamidae
- Genus: Hypsilurus
- Species: H. macrolepis

Binomial name
- Hypsilurus macrolepis (Peters, 1872)

Species of lizard

Hypsilurus macrolepis, the Solomons tree dragon, is a species of agama found in the Solomon Islands.
