= Crater Lakes National Park =

National park in Australia

- IUCN category II (national park)
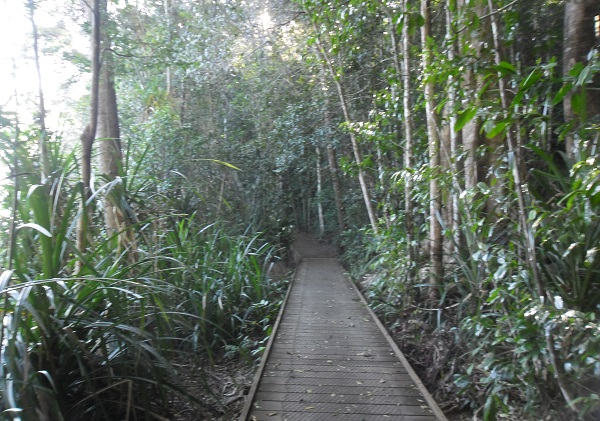

- Location within Queensland
- Location: Queensland
- Coordinates: 17°14′45″S 145°37′44″E
- Area: 9.59 km^{2} (3.70 sq mi)
- Established: 1994
- Governing body: Queensland Parks and Wildlife Service
- Website: https://parks.des.qld.gov.au/parks/crater-lakes

Crater Lakes National Park is a protected area in Far North Queensland, Queensland, Australia, 1,367 km northwest of Brisbane. The park contains two volcanically formed lakes, Lake Barrine and Lake Eacham (Yidyam). Both lakes have walking trails around each lake; boat tours are also given at Lake Barrine.

One of the recognizable features of the park are giant bull kauri pine trees (Agathis microstachya).

The average elevation of the terrain is 729 metres.

== History ==
In 1934, the Queensland Government created Lake Barrine National Park and Lake Eacham National Park. In 1988, UNESCO declared the Wet Tropics of Queensland a World Heritage Site with 14 areas protected, one of which was 484 hectares (1,200 acres) at Lake Barrine and 505 hectares (1,250 acres) at Lake Eacham. In 1994, the Queensland Government merged Lake Barrine National Park and Lake Eacham National Park to form Crater Lakes National Park.

== See also ==
- Protected areas of Queensland
