= Lake Eacham (Queensland) =

Crater lake in Queensland, Australia

Lake Eacham (Yidyam or Wiinggina)
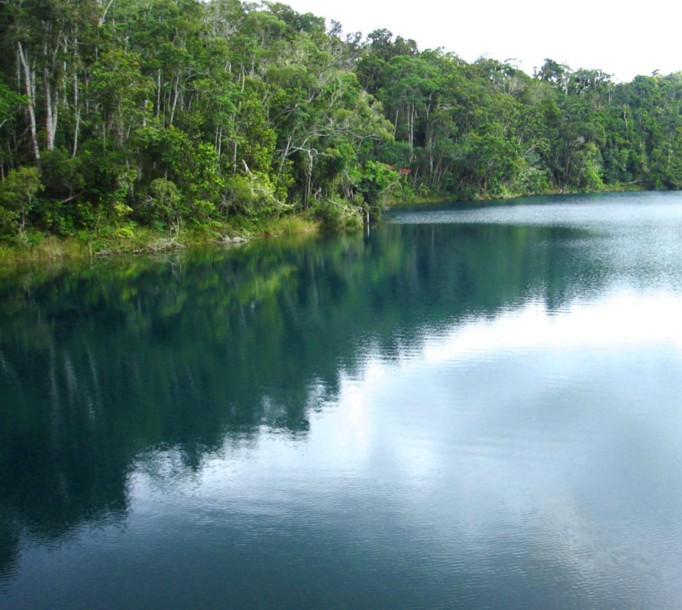
- View of Lake and Lake's edge from a Queensland National Parks viewing platform.

- Location within Australia Location within Queensland
- Location: Atherton Tableland, Queensland, Australia
- Coordinates: 17.285°S 145.625°E
- Type: Crater lake
- Basin countries: Australia
- Surface area: 429,582.77 m^{2} (4,623,990.5 sq ft)
- Average depth: 65.5 m (215 ft)
- Max. depth: 66 m (217 ft)
- Water volume: 16,812,000 kL (593,700,000 cu ft)

Lake Eacham (originally Yidyam or Wiinggina) is a popular lake of volcanic origin on the Atherton Tableland of Queensland, Australia, within the World Heritage listed Wet Tropics of Queensland. It is within the locality of Lake Eacham in the Tablelands Region local government area.

== Origins ==
=== Geology ===
Lake Eacham (Yidyam) was formed over 9,130 years ago when molten magma from the Earth's mantle rose to the surface and heated the water table. The steam that resulted from the boiling water was trapped underground, until massive explosions signalled its release. Huge cracks appeared in the ground and the trees that once lathed the mountainside were levelled and burnt. Eventually, after the eruptions, groundwater filled the crater and the trees grew back, creating the tranquil lake used today by families and tourists for recreation. There are no streams that flow into or out the lake, and since water is only lost through soakage and evaporation and only replenished through rainfall, the level can fluctuate up to 4 metres between wet and dry seasons. The nearby Lake Barrine formed in a similar way, over 17,300 years ago.

=== Mythology ===
The local Ngadjon -jii (Aboriginal peoples), name the lake Wiinggina and tell a parallel story of the lake's origins, as follows

"Two young fellas were trying to spear that wallaby. But they missed and hit a flame tree. That’s a sacred tree. The young fellas not supposed to be out hunting. They weren’t initiated. Their elders told them to stay put, not go out hunting. But they didn’t listen. When they pulled their spear out, part of a grub came out with the spear, which was a witchetty grub. They started cutting down that tree to get more grubs. When they cut down that tree, the ground began to shake. Those two fellas had made Yamini (rainbow serpent) angry. Then the sky turned orange, then all these people back at the camp, the earth went from underneath them, sucked them in, whoosh, they all got drowned. Where they were camped became Bana Wiingina (Lake Eacham)." (Warren Cannendo, Ngadjon-Jii)

This story, in all its local versions, is part of an indigenous oral history and mythology believed to be an oral record recalling those volcanic events more than 10,000 years old.

== European history ==
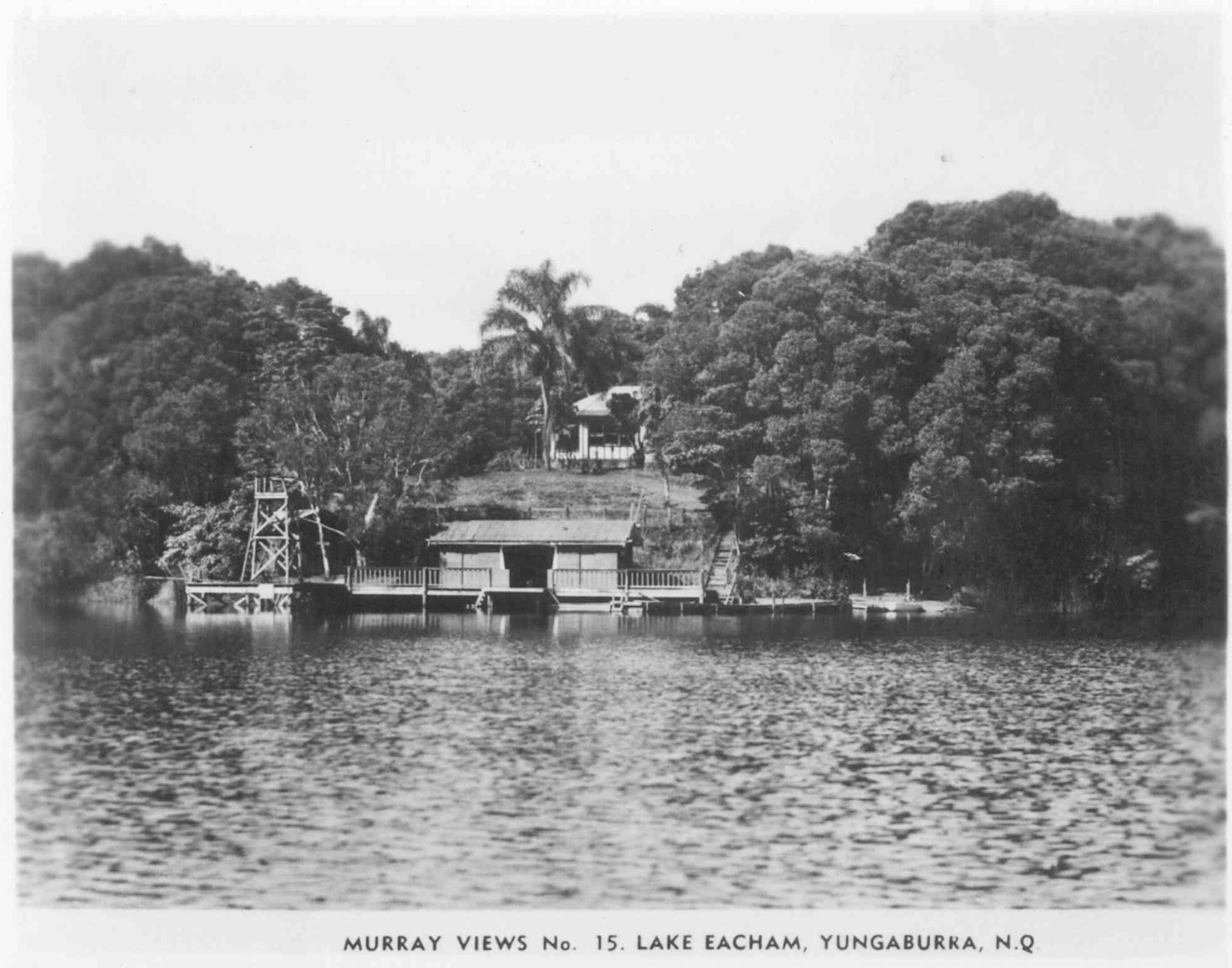
Lake Eacham guest house circa 1940

Back in 1886, Lake Eacham (Yidyam) was included within original survey plans subdividing the whole of the Lake Eacham area into farming blocks. By 1888, however, the scenic value of the lake was recognised, and both the lake plus a narrow band of 'shoreline' rainforest were formally proclaimed "scenic reserve". For almost 50 years (1888–1936) the Lake was managed, used and enjoyed as a scenic reserve, with, at times, boats and boating; a guest house; speed boats; and watersking.

In 1934, the Queensland Government declared the lake and immediate surrounds be protected and managed as Lake Eacham National Park. In 1988, UNESCO declared the Wet Tropics of Queensland a World Heritage Site with 14 areas protected, two of which were 484 hectares (1,200 acres) at Lake Barrine and 505 hectares (1,250 acres) at Lake Eacham. In 1994, the Queensland Government merged Lake Barrine National Park and Lake Eacham National Park to form Crater Lakes National Park.

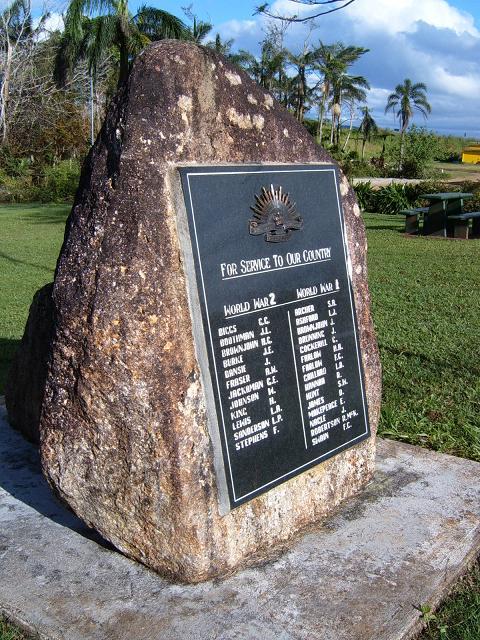
Eacham war memorial, 2006

== A closed ecosystem and a near-extinction ==
Lake Eacham (Yidyam) is isolated from any other watercourse (making it an enclosed catchment). How any fish arrived there to begin with is a mystery, but somehow, the Lake Eacham rainbowfish (Melanotaenia eachamensis) found its way into the volcanic lake. Unfortunately for the small species, other larger fish were introduced into this closed system and eventually, these larger fish ate the Lake Eacham rainbowfish into extinction - at least as far as the lake was concerned.

Aquarists had been collecting the fish from the Lake Eacham National Park (illegally) and were very successful at breeding them. These private collections became the source stock to reintroduce the fish to the lake. However, the cause of the species' initial demise was still living in the lake and proceeded to deplete the entire population of reintroduced stock. Ichthyologists working in the rivers and streams of the Atherton Tableland have found the Lake Eacham rainbowfish in the Tully, Herbert and Johnstone Rivers and Dirran Creek.

In addition to the rainbowfish, Lake Eacham has two other native fish species: the gudgeon Mogurnda adspersa and the hardyhead Craterocephalus stercusmuscarum. As at 2022, only the hardyhead remains in the lake. It is believed that other non-native fish introduced to the lake have out-competed the other native species.

== Protected area status ==
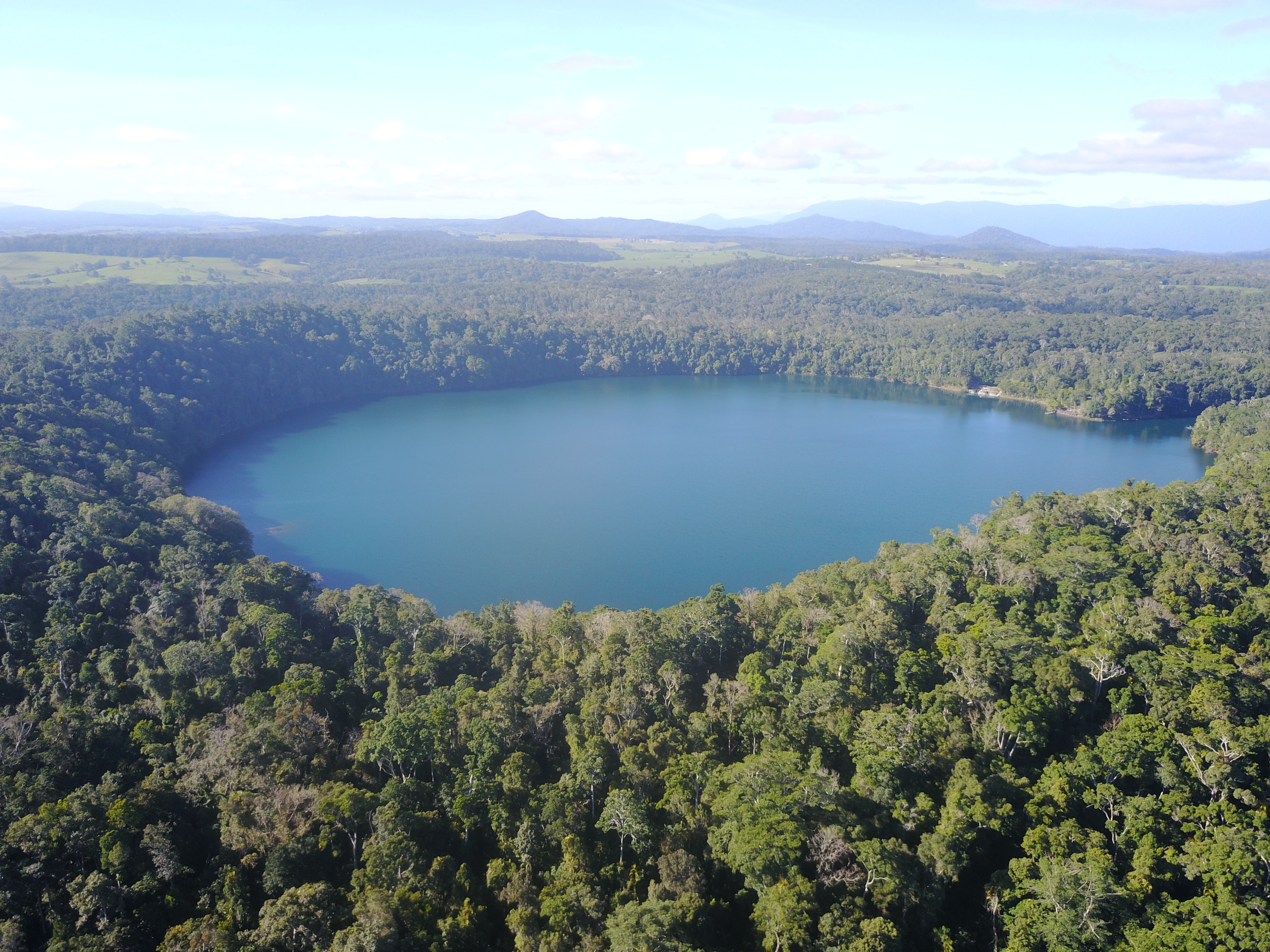
Aerial view of Lake Eacham, looking towards the north-east.

Lake Eacham (Yidyam) is the main feature of the 4.89-square-kilometre (1.89 sq mi) Crater Lakes National Park, with a dense rainforest and thousands of small animals. It is therefore a protected area under Queensland State legislation (Nature Conservation Act 1994), and, as such, the natural and cultural resources most closely associated with the lake are protected and managed by the Queensland National Parks and Wildlife Service.

The lake has an average depth of 38 metres (125 ft) with a maximum depth of 65.5 m (215 ft) and is considered by locals as being ideal for swimming, canoeing, bushwalking, and bird watching. No motor boats are allowed on the lake. It features a pontoon great for diving into the deep water. A large grassy area is set aside for recreation. There is a circuit walk around the lake that takes around 45 minutes to complete. There are also a population of turtles that can usually be seen just to the left of the pontoon.

== See also ==
- Lake Euramoo (Ngimun)
- List of lakes in Australia
- List of volcanoes in Australia
- Mount Hypipamee Crater
