= Maarten Dirk van Renesse van Duivenbode =

Maarten Dirk van Renesse van Duivenbode (June 2, 1804 – March 31, 1878) was a Dutch merchant, trader of bird skins for fashion and naturalia, captain, commander and honorary major in Ternate (Dutch East Indies). From 1858 to 1861 he provided lodging and assistance to Alfred Russel Wallace when he travelled through the Moluccan islands.

== Biography ==
Maarten Dirk was born in Ternate. His father was Dirk Maartens van Duivenbode. In 1825 he married Carolina Jacoba Weintré (1812–1836). They got three sons and one daughter. The eldest son is called Lodewijk Willem Alexander who became also a trader in naturalia. After the death of his wife he remarried the Chinese born Gim Nio, later baptised Antoinette Elisabeth Johanna. They had three children. One of them is Adolphina Susanna Wilhelmina (1844 – 1919 Delft). In 1865 she married with Antonie Augustus Bruijn who took over the business in naturalia in Ternate with his brothers in law.

In 1867 the Governor of the Dutch Indies granted Maarten Dirk the addition of the name Van Renesse to his family name.

=== Wallace and Van Duivenbode ===
Wallace travelled from 1854 to 1862 through the Malay Archipelago. From January 1858 on, he stayed three years on Ternate in a house owned by Van Duivenbode (spelled as "van Duivenboden") and used this house as base camp for expeditions to other Maluku Islands like Gilolo. Maarten Dirk van Duivenbode was the man Alfred Russel Wallace called "...Mr. Duivenboden, a native of Ternate, from an ancient Dutch family..." Mr Duivenbode served the Dutch Trade Company (Nederlandse Handelmaatschappij) as a merchant. He was the owner of many ships, plantations and the whole district of Doalasi. Because of his wealth he was nicknamed the "King of Ternate". According to Wallace he was richer and more important than the real sultan of Ternate. Wallace also mentioned the sons of Maarten Dirk who accompanied him when visiting Gilolo.

During this period, 9 March 1858 he sent the manuscript Tendency of varieties to depart indefinite from the original type to Charles Darwin who received this document on 18 June 1858 which urged him to finish his famous On the Origin of Species. Darwin considered Wallace's idea to be identical to his concept of natural selection.

=== Duivenbode's legacy ===
The family and company name of a father, son, and son in law Anton Bruijn traded in, amongst other things, specimens of birds, especially birds of paradise, and thereby giving their name to:

- Duivenbode's bird of paradise
- Duivenbode's riflebird
- Duivenbode's six-wired bird of paradise
- Duyvenbode's lory (Chalcopsitta duivenbodei), also known as the brown lory
- Elegant sunbird (Aethopyga duyvenbodei)
- and a dragonfly Brachydiplax duivenbodei

They also delivered items to Hermann Schlegel (Leiden), Adolf Bernhard Meyer (Dresden) and other European museums. The Zoological Museum Amsterdam received in 1883 about hundred skins, used for the International Trade Exhibition in Amsterdam.

== Sources ==
- Heij, dr. C.J. (2011) Biographical Notes of Antonie Augustus Bruijn (1842–1890). IBP Press, Bogor. ISBN 978-979-493-294-0.
