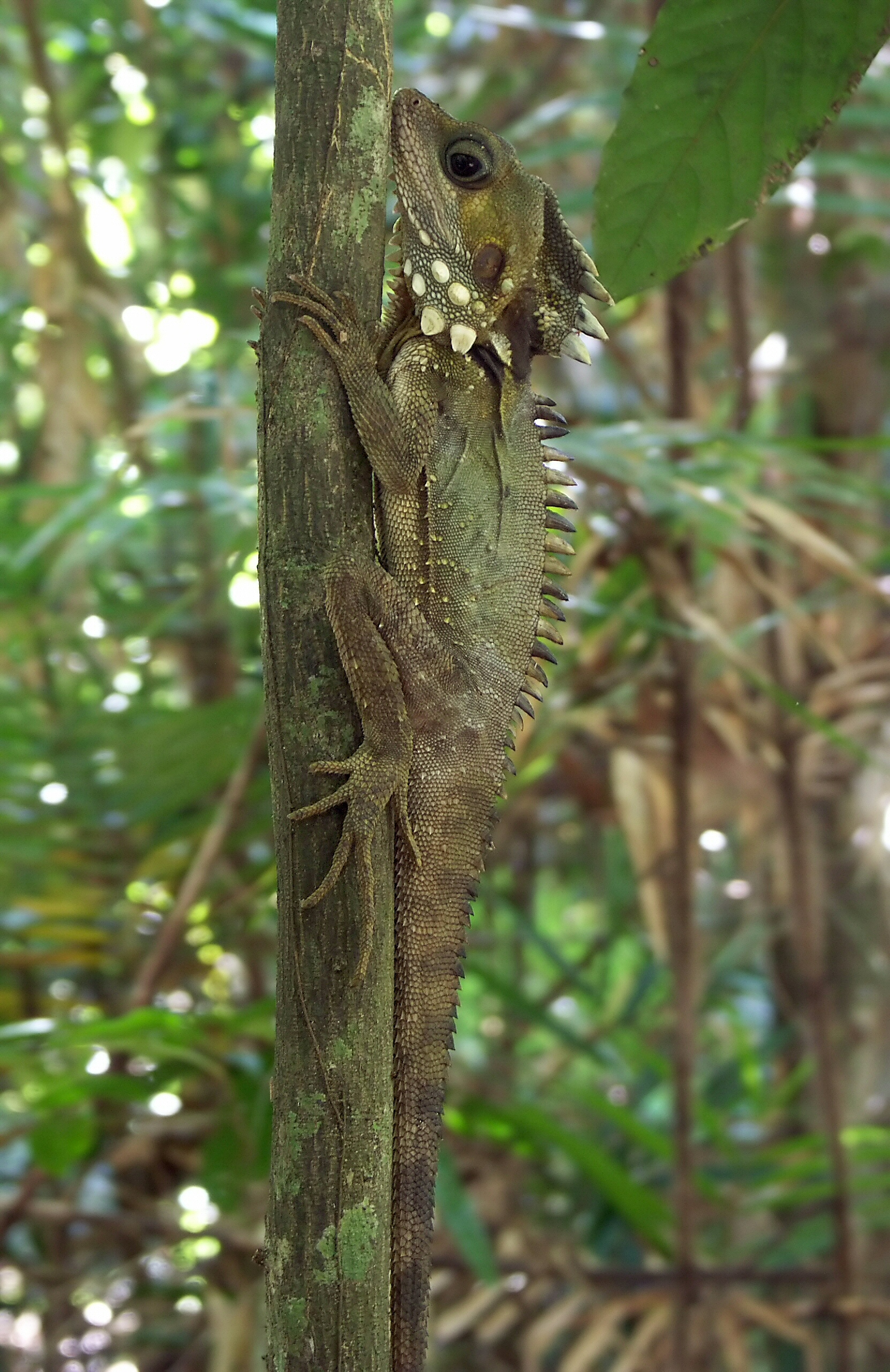
- Lophosaurus boydii

Scientific classification
- Domain: Eukaryota
- Kingdom: Animalia
- Phylum: Chordata
- Class: Reptilia
- Order: Squamata
- Suborder: Iguania
- Family: Agamidae
- Subfamily: Amphibolurinae
- Genus: Lophosaurus; Fitzinger, 1843

= Lophosaurus =

Genus of lizards

Lophosaurus is a genus of arboreal agamid lizards from Australia and Melanesia.

== Species ==
As of 2016, Lophosaurus contains the following 3 species:

- Lophosaurus boydii (Macleay, 1884) – Boyd's forest dragon
- Lophosaurus dilophus (A.M.C. Duméril & Bibron, 1837) – Indonesian forest dragon
- Lophosaurus spinipes (A.M.C. Duméril & A.H.A. Duméril, 1851) – southern forest dragon, southern angle-headed dragon

Nota bene: A binomial authority in parentheses indicates that the species was originally described in a genus other than Lophosaurus.
