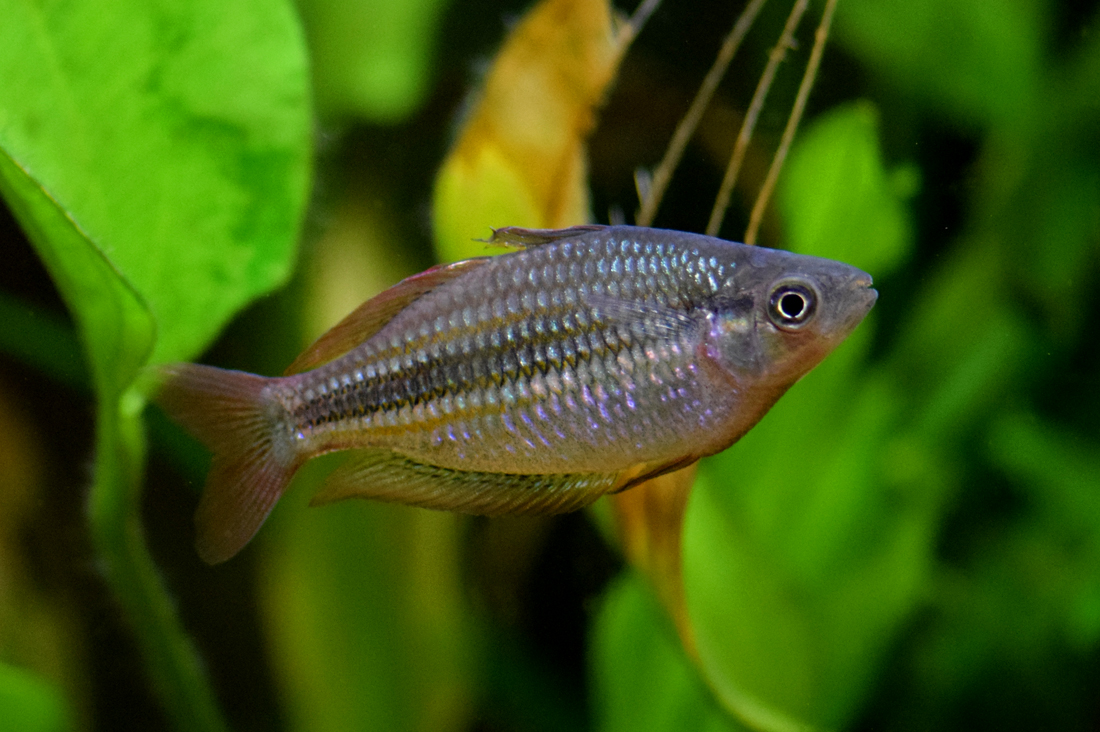
- A Lake Eacham rainbowfish in an aquarium

Conservation status
- Endangered (IUCN 3.1)

Scientific classification
- Kingdom: Animalia
- Phylum: Chordata
- Class: Actinopterygii
- Order: Atheriniformes
- Family: Melanotaeniidae
- Genus: Melanotaenia
- Species: M. eachamensis

Binomial name
- Melanotaenia eachamensis G. R. Allen & N. J. Cross, 1982

= Lake Eacham rainbowfish =

Species of fish

The Lake Eacham rainbowfish (Melanotaenia eachamensis) is a species of rainbowfish in the subfamily Melanotaeniidae. It was once believed to be endemic to Yidyam (Lake Eacham), Queensland, Australia, but has since been proven to have a wider range.

== Conservation ==
The species was initially thought to be extinct due to predation by native fishes—including the Barred Grunter (Amniataba percoides) and Mouth Almighty (Glossamia aprion)—illegally translocated to Lake Eacham in the 1980s. The species was rediscovered in private aquarists' collections, and has also been found to have a wider distribution in the Barron and Johnstone River systems.

It is listed as Endangered on the IUCN Red List and on the EPBC Act 1999.

This species inhabits small creeks and crater lakes, congregating along the shallow margins among aquatic vegetation, fallen logs, or branches.
