= Antonie Augustus Bruijn =

Dutch navy officer, naturalist and trader

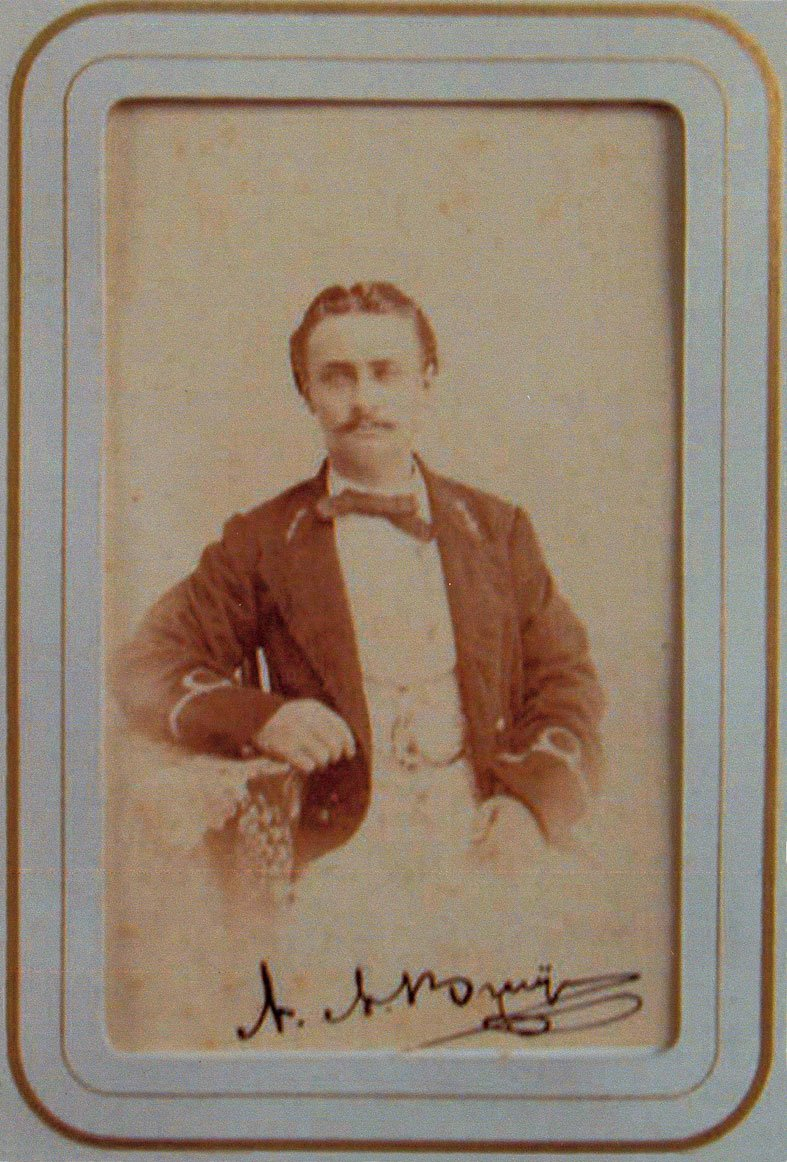
Antonie Augustus Bruijn (Surabaya, 1865)

Antonie Augustus Bruijn (December 27, 1842 – August 11, 1890) was a Dutch navy officer, naturalist and trader in naturalia from the Dutch East Indies. He was the son-in-law of Maarten Dirk van Renesse van Duivenbode who from 1858 to 1861 provided lodging and assistance to Alfred Russel Wallace when he traveled through the Moluccan islands.

== Biography ==
=== Early years as a naval officer ===
Antonie Bruijn was born at Rotterdam as sixth of eight children of Pieter Alidanus Bruijn (b 1799) and Henrietta Gabrielle Maris van Oordt (b 1804). Pieter Alidanus Bruijn was a chief engineer shipbuilder for the Royal Dutch Navy (Koninklijke Marine).

Bruijn entered the service of the Royal Dutch Navy in Den Helder at early age. In 1857 he was appointed naval Cadet 3rd class and in 1861 sailed for the first time to the Dutch East Indies. In 1864 he was promoted to lieutenant 2nd class. In 1865 he was the captain commander of the national guard of the Sultan of Ternate. In 1867 he requested for absence without leave because of health reasons and on October 2, 1867, he was honorably discharged.

=== Life on Ternat ===
In 1865 he married Adolphine Susanna Wilhelmina van Rennesse van Duivenbode (1844 Ternate -1919 Delft) in Ternate. She was the daughter of Maarten Dirk van Renesse van Duivenbode. This was the man Alfred Russel Wallace called "...Mr. Duivenbode(n), a native of Ternate from an ancient Dutch family..." After his marriage and discharge Bruijn took over the business in naturalia in Ternate with his brothers in law.

=== Bruijn's legacy ===
As a trader in naturalia Anton Bruijn delivered items to Hermann Schlegel (Leiden), Tommaso Salvadori (Turin), and the Muséum national d'Histoire naturelle in Paris. Bruijn sent in 1877 an expedition to New-Guinea (Vogelkop, the land of the Karons) to do ethnographic studies and to collect specimens of Zaglossus bruijnii. Further on there is little known about Bruijn's life in Ternate. Much more is known about his father in law (see above).

There are four birds species that are named after him: Waigeo brushturkey (Aepypodius bruijnii ), red-breasted pygmy parrot (Micropsitta bruijnii ), torrent-lark (Grallina bruijni ), and pale-billed sicklebill (Drepanornis bruijnii ). Further species include Mantou's riflebird and two mammal species: western long-beaked echidna (Zaglossus bruijnii ) and lowland brush mouse (Pogonomelomys bruijni ).

One lizard is named in his honor: Bruijn's forest dragon (Hypsilurus bruijnii ).

== Sources ==
- Heij, dr. C.J. (2011). Biographical Notes of Antonie Augustus Bruijn (1842-1890). IBP Press, Bogor. ISBN 978-979-493-294-0.
