= Lake Barrine =

Volcanic crater lake in Queensland, Australia

Lake Barrine (Barany)
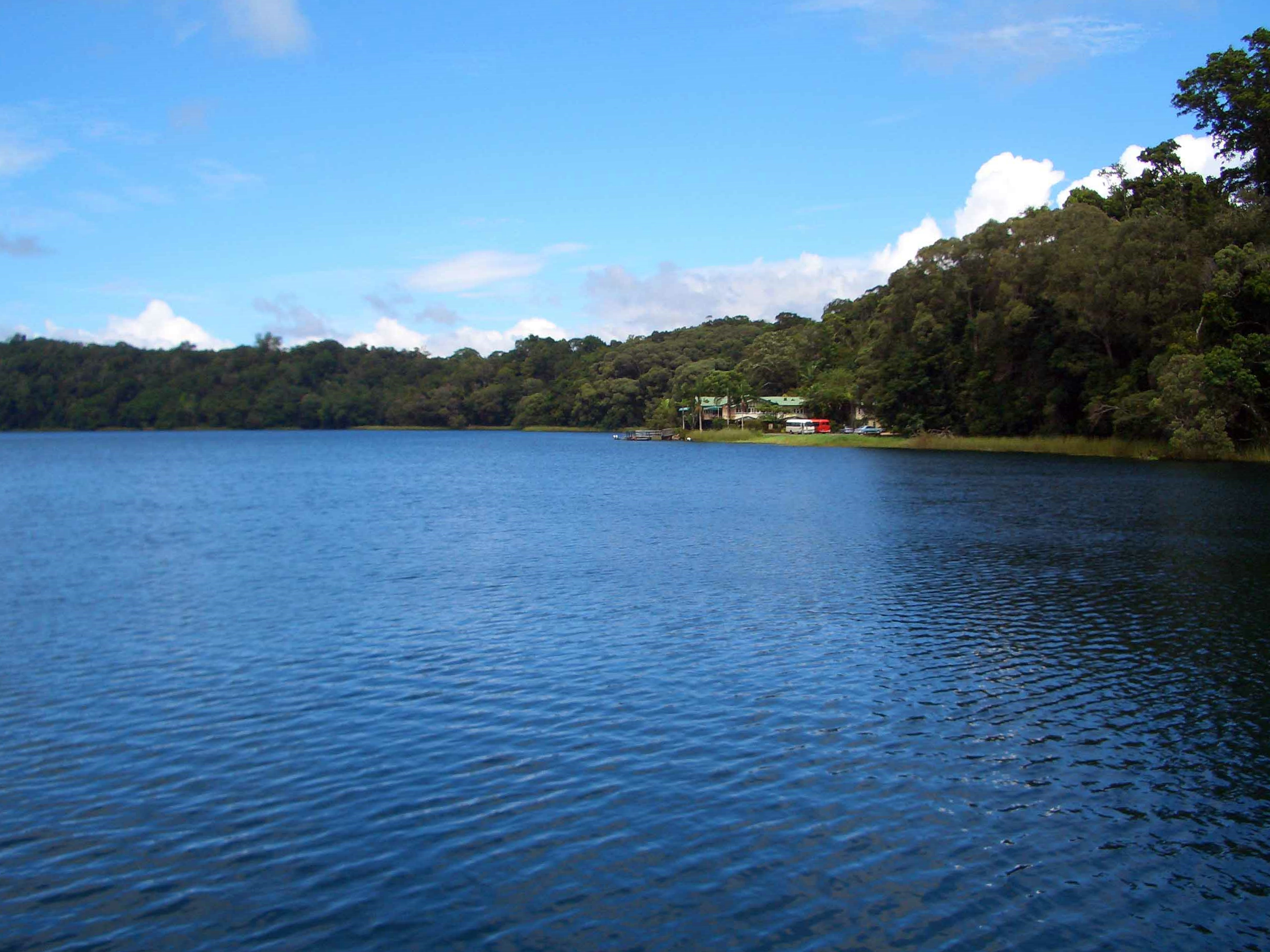
- View from a cruise

- Location within Australia Location within Queensland
- Location: Lake Barrine, Queensland
- Coordinates: 17.2500°S 145.6333°E
- Type: Crater lake
- Primary inflows: precipitation
- Basin countries: Australia
- Max. width: 1,230 m (4,040 ft)
- Average depth: 35 m (115 ft)
- Max. depth: 65 m (213 ft)
- Shore length^{1}: 4.5 km (2.8 mi)
- Surface elevation: 730 m (2,400 ft)
- ^{1} Shore length is not a well-defined measure.

Lake Barrine is a freshwater lake on the eastern parts of Atherton Tableland in the locality of Lake Barrine, in the Tablelands Region of Far North Queensland, Australia, close to Lake Eacham. The lake and surrounds are protected within the Crater Lakes National Park and are accessible via the Gillies Highway.

== Origin ==
Lake Barrine was formed over 17,000 years ago when a large volcano erupted, leaving a crater that over time filled up with water to create a lake. The crater or maar was formed as a result of a series of volcanic explosions. These explosions were caused by the hot molten rock coming into contact with groundwater. This caused a build-up of steam, gases and pressure which blasted the central core from the volcano. This massive explosion left a huge crater, which filled with rainwater to create Lake Barrine. Local Aboriginals called the lake Barany.

== Description ==
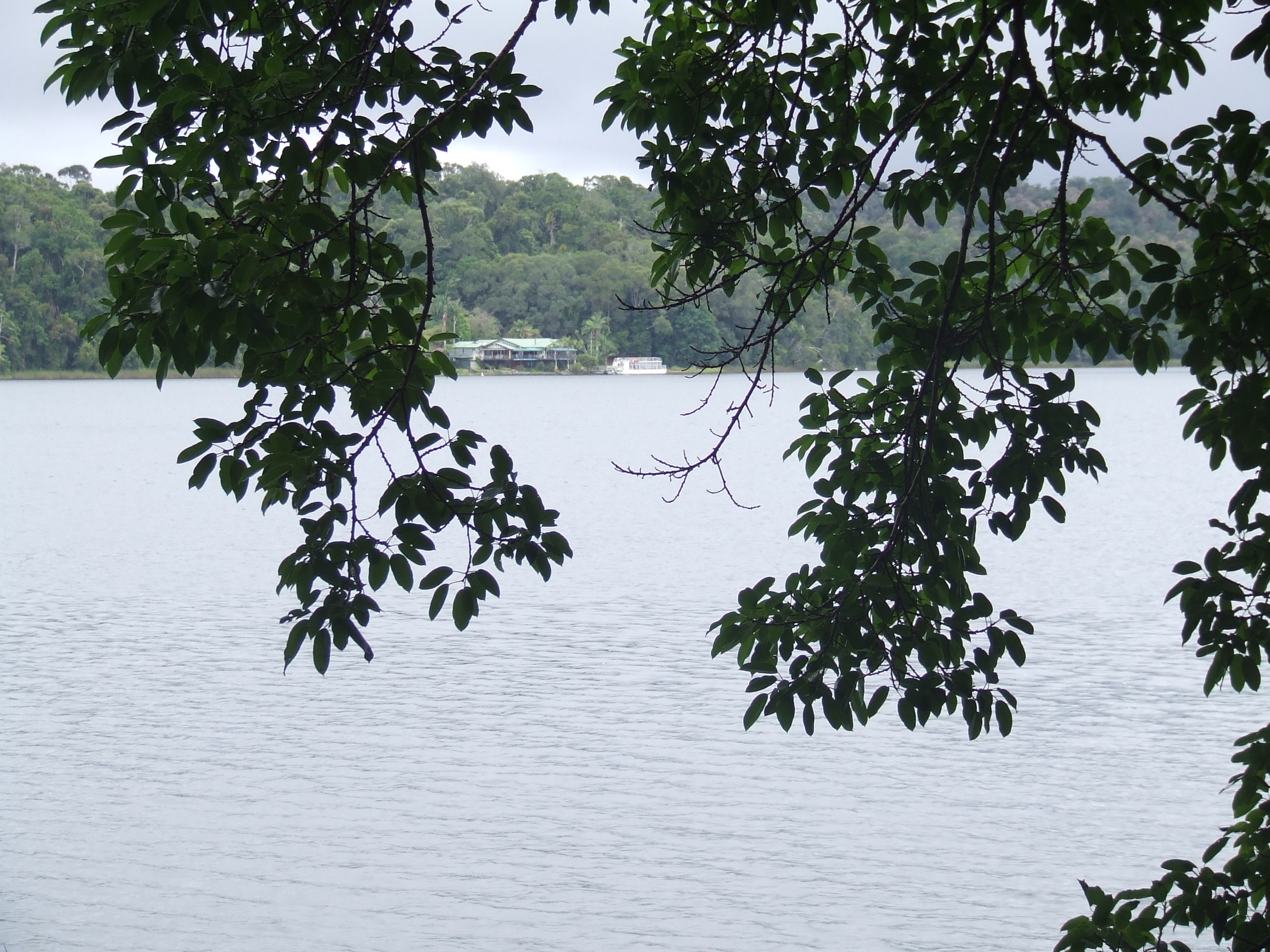
Viewed from the forest trail that encircles the lake

The largest of the natural volcanic lakes in the area, Lake Barrine is 730 m above sea level. It is about 1 km in diameter, with a shoreline of almost 4.5 km, an average depth of 35 m and a maximum depth of 65 m. No streams or springs feed the crystal clear lake; it is filled only by rainwater. During the wet season a small creek flows out of the lake. It joins Toohey Creek which is a tributary of the Mulgrave River.

== Facilities ==
There are walking tracks around the lake and tour operators offer cruises on the lake. Facilities at the lake include picnic grounds, a kiosk and a pre-war tea house which was built in 1926. Visitors may also swim in the lake and partake in birdwatching. Camping and domestic animals are prohibited near the lake.

== Fauna and flora ==
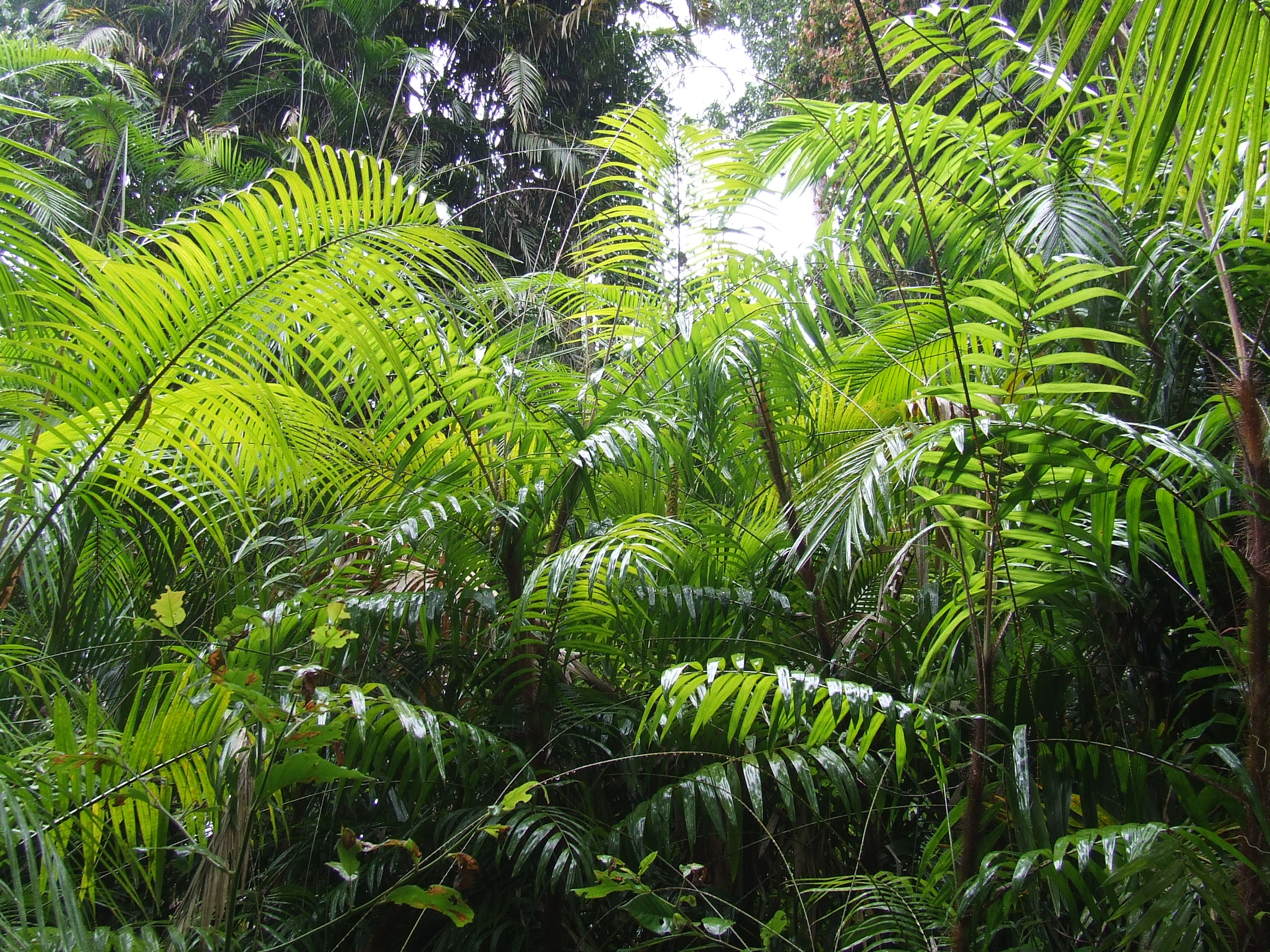
Ferns and palm trees on the forest walk

The surrounding rainforest contains giant kauri (Agathis microstachya), red cedar (Toona ciliata) and flowering umbrella trees (Heptapleurum actinophyllum). Wildlife common in the area include eastern water dragons, giant eels, saw-shelled turtles, scrub pythons (Morelia kinghorni), pied cormorants, black ducks, plumed whistling ducks, black coot, whistling kites, brahminy kites, black kites, white-breasted sea eagles and dusky moorhens.

The aquatic environment include a few native species including Speckled_longfin_eel Anguilla Reinhardtii, Bony Bream Nematalosa ereb and the Lake Eacham rainbowfish Melanotaenia eachamensis. Despite being a lake with no rivers or creeks feeding into Lake Barrine the spotted tilapia Tilapia mariae has found its way into the National Park and are now in plague proportions in this freshwater Ecosystem.

== World War II ==
During World War II the teahouse was used by the Australian Army as a convalescent home.

== See also ==
- List of lakes of Australia
- List of volcanoes in Australia
- Mount Hypipamee Crater
