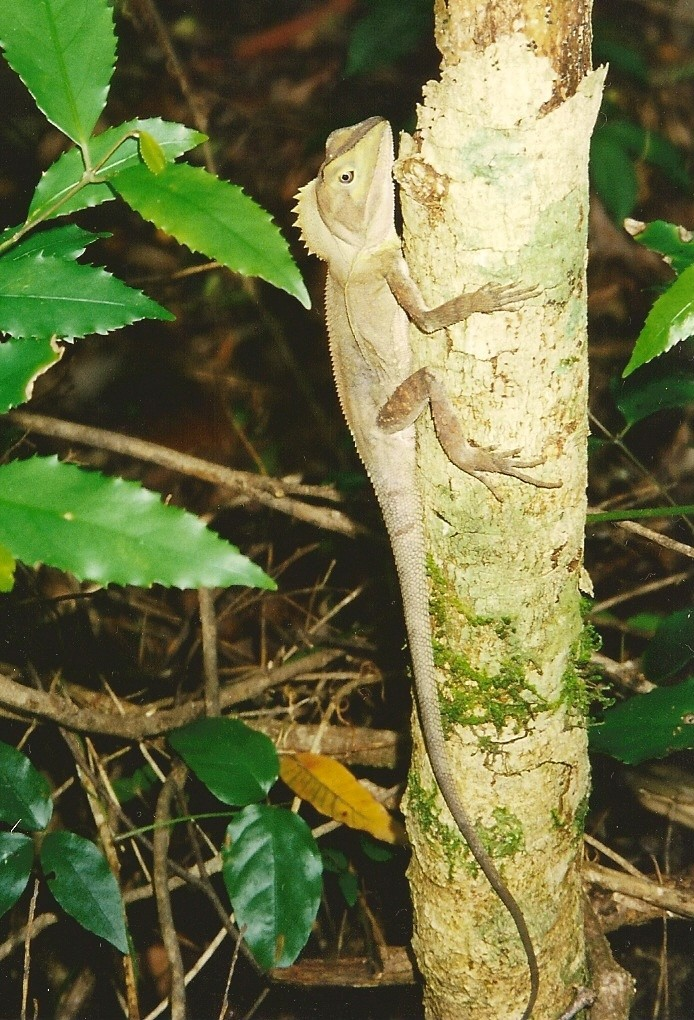
- At Boorganna Nature Reserve, near Taree. NSW

Conservation status
- Least Concern (IUCN 3.1)

Scientific classification
- Kingdom: Animalia
- Phylum: Chordata
- Class: Reptilia
- Order: Squamata
- Suborder: Iguania
- Family: Agamidae
- Genus: Lophosaurus
- Species: L. spinipes

Binomial name
- Lophosaurus spinipes (A.M.C. Duméril, 1851)

= Lophosaurus spinipes =

Species of lizard

The southern angle-headed dragon or southern forest dragon (Lophosaurus spinipes) is a species of agamid lizard endemic to Australia.

== Geographic range ==
L. spinipes is native to eastern Australian rainforests and rainforest margins from around Gosford in New South Wales to near Gympie in Queensland. It is also present in Barrington Tops National Park, New South Wales.

== Description ==
The southern angle-headed dragon has a large and continuous nuchal crest with a moderately large vertebral crest. The angular brow is pronounced on both adults and juveniles. The snout to vent length is around 110 to 150 mm (4.3 to 5.9 in), additionally there is a long tail which takes the total length to 350 mm (14 in).

The colour varies from shades of brown, grey and green. Patterns where present consist of various irregular mottling, blotches and variegations.

== Behaviour ==
Primarily arboreal, the southern angle-headed dragon is cryptic, slow moving and well camouflaged. It's sometimes encountered basking in sunlight after rain but is mostly a thermoconformer, allowing its body temperature to fluctuate with the ambient temperature. It is usually seen perching on the trunks of small trees or on buttress roots or old stumps. When disturbed, it tends not to dash for cover, but rather slides around the trunk until it is out of view.

== Diet ==
The diet includes insects and other arthropods such as spiders and centipedes.

== Reproduction ==
Eggs are laid in shallow nests in rainforest clearings, including along road edges and walking tracks. There is some evidence that females will occasionally lay communal nests. The eggs are vulnerable to predation, particularly by goannas.

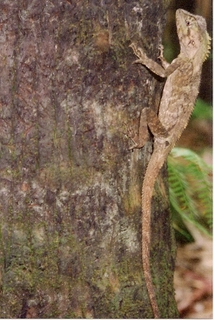
A small southern angle-headed dragon on a cabbage tree palm, near Forster, Australia
