= List of hybrid birds-of-paradise =

Hybridisation occurs occasionally among birds-of-paradise, when individuals of different species successfully mate to produce hybrid offspring. Even species from different genera can hybridise, despite substantial differences in morphology and courtship behaviour.

In the late 19th and early 20th centuries, a number of unusual bird-of-paradise specimens, often known from only one or a few museum skins, were described as distinct species. Many had entered European collections through the extensive trade in skins, in which unusual specimens were especially sought after by dealers and museums. In 1930, the German ornithologist Erwin Stresemann systematically reviewed these supposed species, and concluded that many were actually hybrids. Stresemann examined numerous controversial museum specimens and identified their likely parental species from their intermediate morphologies.

Genomic analyses of museum specimens published in 2024 largely supported these and other earlier morphological assessments. Most specimens were found to be first-generation (F1) hybrids, with roughly equal genetic contributions from each parental species. Two specimens were identified as intergeneric backcrosses (descendants of hybrids that had subsequently reproduced with one of their parental species), showing that some hybrids can result in DNA from one bird-of-paradise species being introduced into another from a different genus. Additionally, two specimens previously identified as hybrids from their morphology showed no detectable genomic evidence of hybridisation, although low levels of hybrid ancestry could not be excluded. Genomic comparisons across established bird-of-paradise species have also found widespread evidence of past introgression, showing that hybridisation has been a recurring feature of their evolutionary history.

== Known and proposed hybrids ==
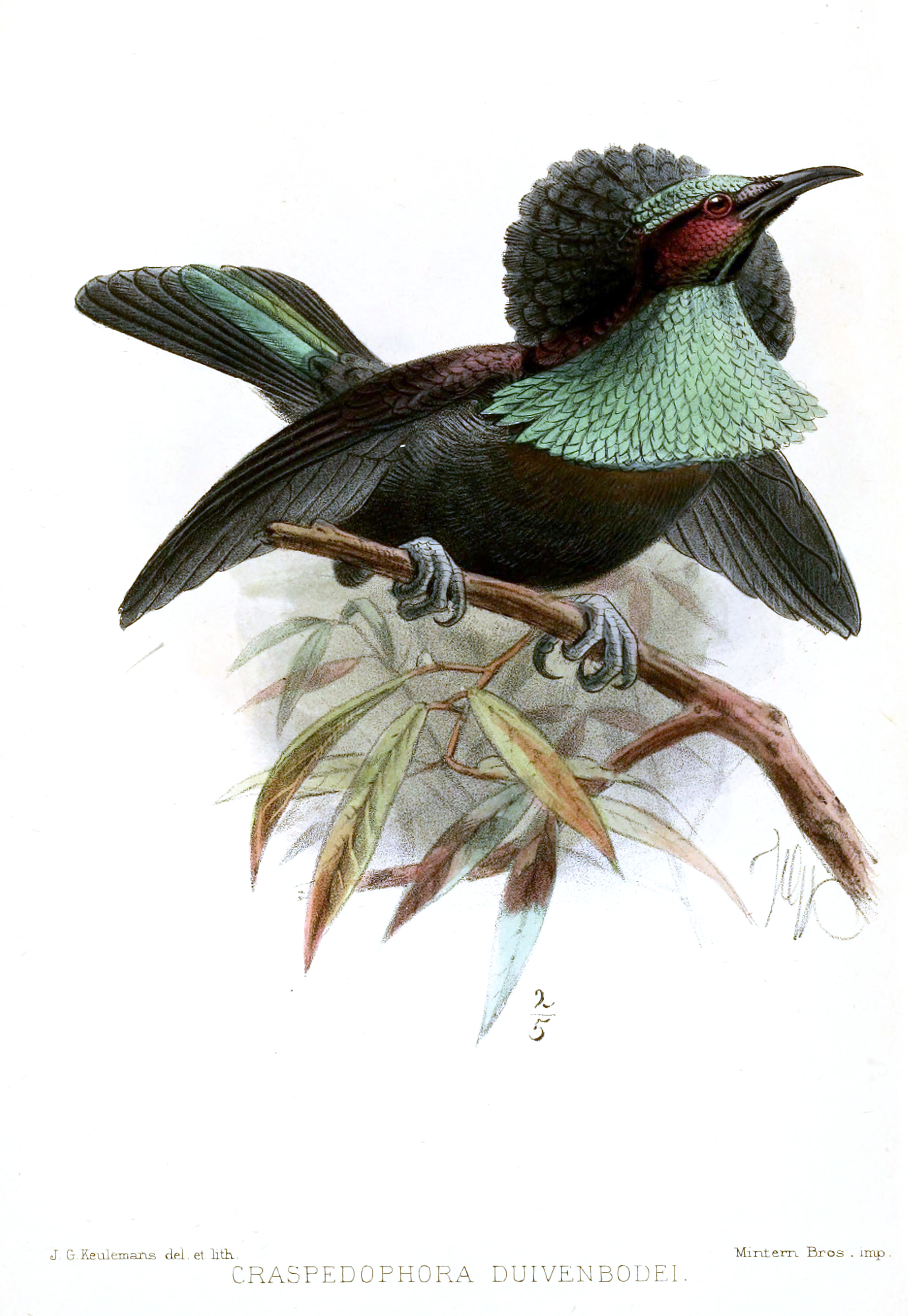
Illustration of Duivenbode's riflebird, a hybrid between the magnificent riflebird and lesser lophorina.

Some named hybrids and proposed hybrids are:

- Astrapian sicklebill (Astrapia nigra x Epimachus f. fastosus, confirmed by genomic analysis). Originally described as species Epimachus astrapioides Rothschild, 1897.
- Barnes's astrapia (Astrapia mayeri x A. stephaniae). Originally described as species Astrarchia barnesi Iredale, 1948.
- Bensbach's bird-of-paradise (Ptiloris magnificus x Paradisaea m. minor, confirmed by genomic analysis). Originally described as species Janthothorax bensbachi Büttikofer, 1894.
- Blood's bird-of-paradise (Paradisaea raggiana salvadorii x Paradisornis rudolphi margaritae, supported by genomic analysis). Originally described as species Paradisaea bloodi Iredale, 1948.
- Duivenbode's bird-of-paradise (Paradisaea guilielmi x P. minor finschi, supported by genomic analysis). Originally described as species Paradisaea duivenbodei Ménégaux, 1913.
- Duivenbode's riflebird (Ptiloris magnificus x Lophorina minor, supported by genomic analyses). Originally described as species Paryphephorus (Craspediphora) duivenbodei Meyer, 1890.
- Duivenbode's six-wired bird-of-paradise (Parotia sefilata x Lophorina superba, confirmed by genomic analysis). Originally described as species Parotia duivenbodei Rothschild, 1900.
- Elliot's bird-of-paradise (proposed by Stresemann to be a hybrid of Astrapia nigra x Epimachus f. fastosus, but identified by genomic analysis as Epimachus × Paradigalla, with Paradigalla carunculata identified as the maternal species). Originally described as species Epimachus ellioti Ward, 1873.
- False-lobed astrapia (proposed by Stresemann to be a hybrid of Paradigalla carunculata x Epimachus f. fastosus, but identified by genomic analysis as Paradigalla × Astrapia, with Astrapia nigra identified as the maternal species). Originally described as species Pseudastrapia lobata Rothschild, 1907.
- Gilliard's bird-of-paradise (Paradisaea raggiana salvadorii x P. minor finschi).
- King of Holland's bird-of-paradise (Diphyllodes magnificus x C. regius). Genomic analysis identified one specimen as an F1 hybrid, while two other specimens previously assigned to this hybrid form were genetically assigned as non-hybrids belonging to one of the parental species. Originally described as species Diphyllodes gulielmi III Meyer, 1875.
- Lupton's bird-of-paradise (Paradisaea raggiana salvadorii x P. apoda novaeguineae). Originally described as subspecies Paradisaea apoda luptoni Lowe, 1923.
- Lyre-tailed king bird-of-paradise (Diphyllodes magnificus x Cicinnurus regius). Identified by genomic analysis as an intergeneric backcross with C. regius, rather than an F1 hybrid. Originally described as Cicinnurus lyogyrus.
- Mantou's riflebird (Ptiloris magnificus x Seleucidis melanoleucus, confirmed by genomic analysis). Originally described as Craspedophora mantoui Oustalet, 1891.
- Maria's bird-of-paradise (Paradisaea guilielmi x P. raggiana augustaevictoriae, confirmed by genomic analysis). Originally described as species Paradisaea maria Reichenow, 1894.
- Mysterious bird of Bobairo (presumed Epimachus fastosus atratus x Lophorina latipennis feminina).
- Rothschild's bird-of-paradise (Paradisaea raggiana augustaevictoriae x P. minor finschi). Originally described as species Paradisaea mixta Rothschild, 1921.
- Rothschild's lobe-billed bird-of-paradise (Paradigalla carunculata x Lophorina s. superba, supported by genomic analysis). Originally described as species Loborhamphus nobilis Rothschild, 1901.
- Ruys's bird-of-paradise (Diphyllodes magnificus x Paradisaea m. minor, confirmed by genomic analysis). Originally described as species NeoParadisaea ruysi van Oort, 1906.
- Schodde's bird-of-paradise (Paradisornis rudolphi margaritae x Parotia l. lawesii).
- Sharpe's lobe-billed parotia (Parotia sefilata x Paradigalla carunculata, confirmed by genomic analysis). Originally described as species Loborhamphus ptilorhis Sharpe, 1908.
- Stresemann's bird-of-paradise (identified morphologically as Lophorina superba x Parotia carolae, but genomic analysis of one specimen identified it as Parotia x Diphyllodes). Originally described as subspecies Lophorina superba pseudoparotia Stresemann, 1934.
- Wilhelmina's bird-of-paradise (Lophorina superba x Diphyllodes magnificus, confirmed by genomic analysis). Originally described as species Lamprothorax wilhelminae Meyer, 1894.
- Wonderful bird-of-paradise (Seleucidis melanoleucus x Paradisaea minor, confirmed by genomic analysis). Originally described as species Paradisaea mirabilis Reichenow, 1901.

== Other possible hybrids ==
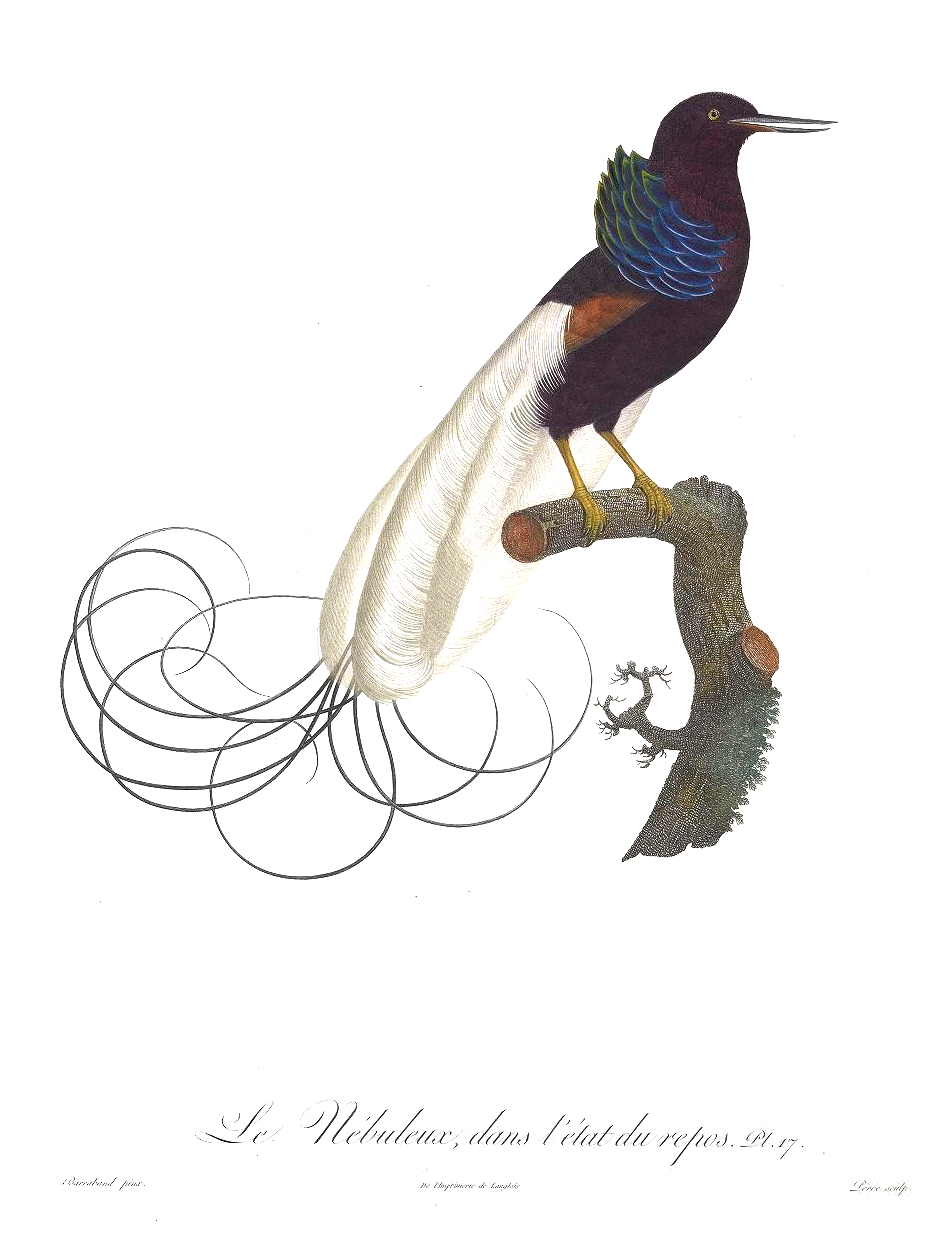
Barraband's mystery black-breasted twelve-wired bird-of-paradise.

18th century French artist Jacques Barraband, known for his ability to illustrate birds with a high degree of accuracy, produced a few illustrations of unidentified birds-of-paradise. It has been postulated that these paintings may be simply inaccurate, depict undescribed species, or depict hybrids that have not since been observed.

On 15 May 2004, New Scientist published one of these paintings, which depicts a bird that most closely resembles the twelve-wired bird-of-paradise, although there are several obvious differences.
