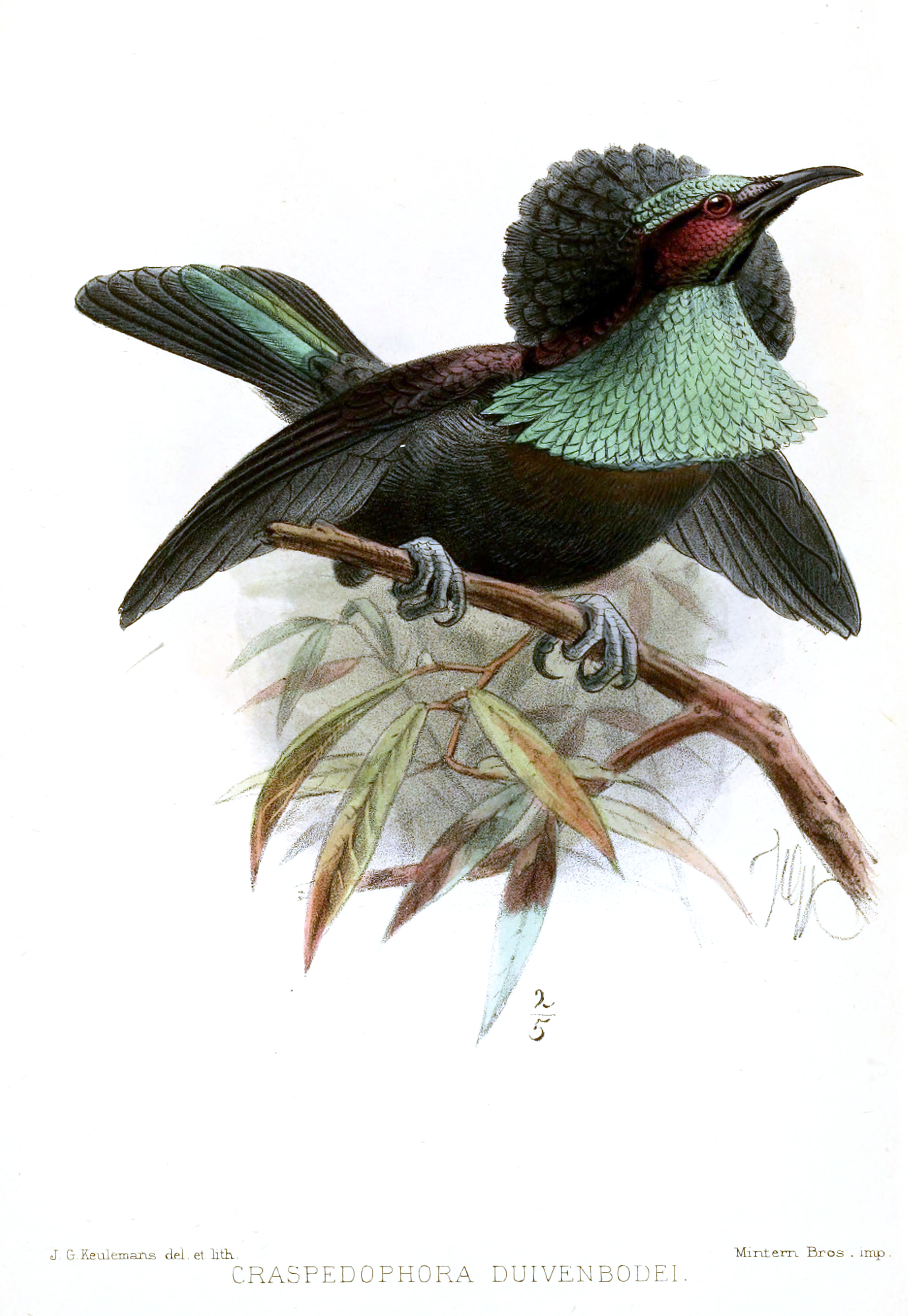

Scientific classification
- Kingdom: Animalia
- Phylum: Chordata
- Class: Aves
- Order: Passeriformes
- Superfamily: Corvoidea
- Family: Paradisaeidae
- Hybrid: Ptiloris magnificus intercedens × Lophorina superba minor

Synonyms
- Paryphephorus (Craspedophora) duivenbodei Meyer, 1890

= Duivenbode's riflebird =

Hybrid bird

Duivenbode's riflebird is a bird in the family Paradisaeidae that is a presumed intergeneric hybrid between a magnificent riflebird and lesser lophorina. The common name commemorates Maarten Dirk van Renesse van Duivenbode (1804-1878), Dutch trader of naturalia on Ternate.

== History ==
Three adult male specimens are recorded of this hybrid: one each in the American Museum of Natural History and British Natural History Museum; the third type specimen in the Dresden Natural History Museum was destroyed in World War II. They derive from the area inland of Yule Island in south-eastern New Guinea, not far from Port Moresby.
