= Duivenbode's bird-of-paradise =

Scientific classification
- Domain: Eukaryota
- Kingdom: Animalia
- Phylum: Chordata
- Class: Aves
- Order: Passeriformes
- Family: Paradisaeidae
- Genus: Paradisaea
- Species: P. guilielmi × P. minor

Synonyms
- Paradisea duivenbodei

Hybrid bird

Duivenbode's bird-of-paradise is a bird in the family Paradisaeidae that is a hybrid between the emperor bird-of-paradise and lesser bird-of-paradise. The common name commemorates Maarten Dirk van Renesse van Duivenbode (1804–1878), Dutch trader of naturalia on Ternate.

== History ==
It is known from a single adult male specimen held in the National Natural History Museum in Paris. Its provenance is uncertain; it is said to come from an island in Geelvink Bay, western New Guinea, but was probably purchased as a trade skin there and is more likely to have derived ultimately from the Huon Peninsula of north-eastern New Guinea where the emperor bird of paradise is found.
