= Wonderful bird-of-paradise =

Scientific classification
- Kingdom: Animalia
- Phylum: Chordata
- Class: Aves
- Order: Passeriformes
- Superfamily: Corvoidea
- Family: Paradisaeidae
- Hybrid: Seleucidis melanoleuca × Paradisaea minor

Synonyms
- Paradisaea mirabilis Reichenow, 1901; Janthothorax mirabilis Rothschild, 1903; Quesoparens mirabilis

Hybrid bird

The wonderful bird-of-paradise, also known as Reichenow's riflebird, is a bird in the family Paradisaeidae that is an intergeneric hybrid between a twelve-wired bird-of-paradise and lesser bird-of-paradise.

== History ==
Five adult male specimens are known of this hybrid, held in the American Museum of Natural History and the Berlin Natural History Museum and coming from Sorong in the Vogelkop Peninsula of north-western New Guinea, Madang on the north-eastern coast of New Guinea, as well as other unknown localities.
