= Sharpe's lobe-billed parotia =

Scientific classification
- Domain: Eukaryota
- Kingdom: Animalia
- Phylum: Chordata
- Class: Aves
- Order: Passeriformes
- Superfamily: Corvoidea
- Family: Paradisaeidae
- Hybrid: Paradigalla carunculata × Parotia sefilata

Synonyms
- Loborhamphus ptilorhis Sharpe, 1908

Hybrid bird

Sharpe's lobe-billed parotia, also known as Sharpe's lobe-billed riflebird, is a bird in the family Paradisaeidae that Erwin Stresemann proposed is an intergeneric hybrid between a long-tailed paradigalla and western parotia, an identity confirmed by DNA analysis.

== History ==
Only one subadult male specimen is known of this hybrid, held in the British Natural History Museum, presumably deriving from the Vogelkop Peninsula of north-western New Guinea. It is named after its describer, British ornithologist Richard Bowdler Sharpe.
