= Rothschild's bird-of-paradise =

Scientific classification
- Kingdom: Animalia
- Phylum: Chordata
- Class: Aves
- Order: Passeriformes
- Family: Paradisaeidae
- Genus: Paradisaea
- Species: P. raggiana × P. minor

Synonyms
- Paradisaea mixta Rothschild, 1921

Hybrid bird

Rothschild's bird-of-paradise is a bird in the family Paradisaeidae that is a hybrid between a raggiana bird-of-paradise and lesser bird-of-paradise. It was named after British ornithologist Walter Rothschild.

== History ==
At least four adult male specimens of this hybrid are known, and are held in the American Museum of Natural History, the British Natural History Museum and the Australian Museum. Although localities are lacking for three of them, one comes from 110 km south of Madang in north-eastern New Guinea.
