= Gilliard's bird-of-paradise =

Scientific classification
- Kingdom: Animalia
- Phylum: Chordata
- Class: Aves
- Order: Passeriformes
- Family: Paradisaeidae
- Genus: Paradisaea
- Species: P. raggiana × P. minor

Hybrid bird

Gilliard's bird-of-paradise is a bird in the family Paradisaeidae that is a hybrid between a raggiana bird-of-paradise and lesser bird-of-paradise. It is known from adult male specimens taken in the upper Baiyer Valley in Papua New Guinea. It was named after American ornithologist Ernest Thomas Gilliard by Clifford Frith and Bruce Beehler.
