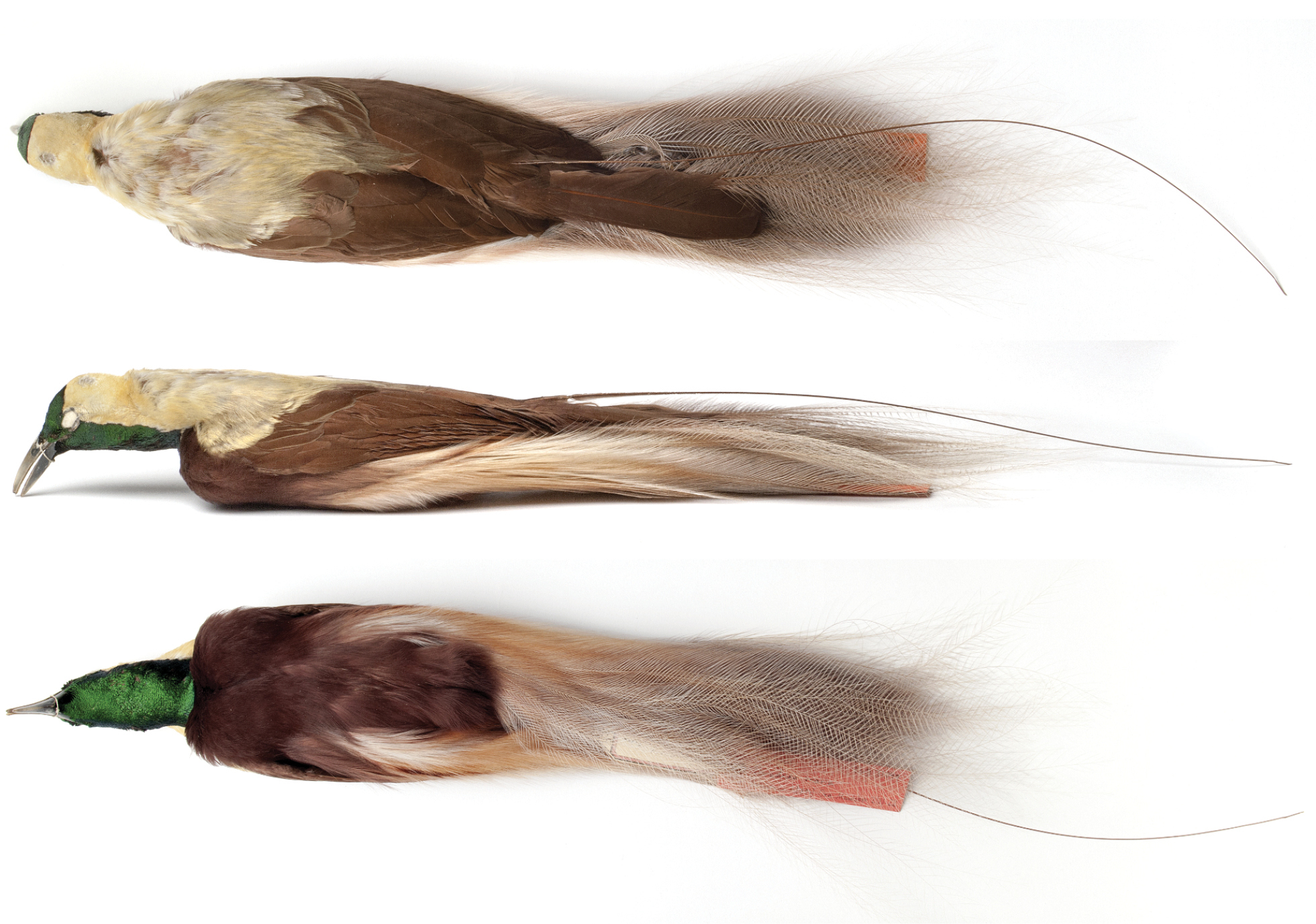

Scientific classification
- Domain: Eukaryota
- Kingdom: Animalia
- Phylum: Chordata
- Class: Aves
- Order: Passeriformes
- Family: Paradisaeidae
- Genus: Paradisaea
- Species: P. maria

Binomial name
- Paradisaea maria Reichenow, 1894

Synonyms
- Paradisaea guilielmi × Paradisaea raggiana augustaevictoriae

= Maria's bird-of-paradise =

Hybrid bird

Maria's bird-of-paradise, also known as Frau Reichenow's bird-of-paradise or Mrs. Reichenow's bird-of-paradise, is a bird in the family Paradisaeidae that is a presumptive hybrid species between an emperor bird-of-paradise and raggiana bird-of-paradise. It was named for the wife of the describer, German ornithologist Anton Reichenow.

== Description ==
Its measurements are largely intermediate between those of the parent taxa.

== History ==
It was named as a supposed new species in 1894 before being largely accepted as a hybrid in the early 20th century. At least six adult male and one female specimens are known, from Sattelberg and the Finisterre Range of the Huon Peninsula in north-eastern New Guinea. The specimens are held by the American Museum of Natural History in New York and the Berlin Natural History Museum. In 2018, another male specimen was described from the State Natural History Museum, Braunschweig, Germany.
