= False-lobed astrapia =

Scientific classification
- Kingdom: Animalia
- Phylum: Chordata
- Class: Aves
- Order: Passeriformes
- Superfamily: Corvoidea
- Family: Paradisaeidae
- Hybrid: Paradigalla carunculata × Astrapia nigra

Synonyms
- Pseudastrapia lobata Rothschild, 1907

Hybrid bird

The false-lobed astrapia, also known as the false-lobed long-tail, is a bird in the family Paradisaeidae that was proposed by Erwin Stresemann to be an intergeneric hybrid between a long-tailed paradigalla and black sicklebill. Another interpretation that has been put forward is that the only known specimen is an immature Elliot's bird-of-paradise. However, a 2024 DNA study found that it is an F1 hybrid between a long-tailed paradigalla and an Arfak astrapia.

== History ==
Only one adult male specimen is known of this hybrid, coming from the Vogelkop Peninsula of north-western New Guinea, and held in the American Museum of Natural History.
