= Mantou's riflebird =

Scientific classification
- Kingdom: Animalia
- Phylum: Chordata
- Class: Aves
- Order: Passeriformes
- Superfamily: Corvoidea
- Family: Paradisaeidae
- Hybrid: Seleucidis melanoleuca × Ptiloris magnificus

Synonyms
- Craspedophora mantoui Oustalet, 1891; Heteroptilorhis mantoui Sharpe, 1898; Craspedophora bruyni Büttikofer, 1895

Hybrid bird

Mantou's riflebird, also known as Bruijn's riflebird, is a bird in the family Paradisaeidae that is presumed to be an intergeneric hybrid between a twelve-wired bird-of-paradise and magnificent riflebird.

== History ==
At least 12 adult male specimens are known of this hybrid, held in various museums and of unknown provenance except one from the Arfak Mountains of north-western New Guinea.
