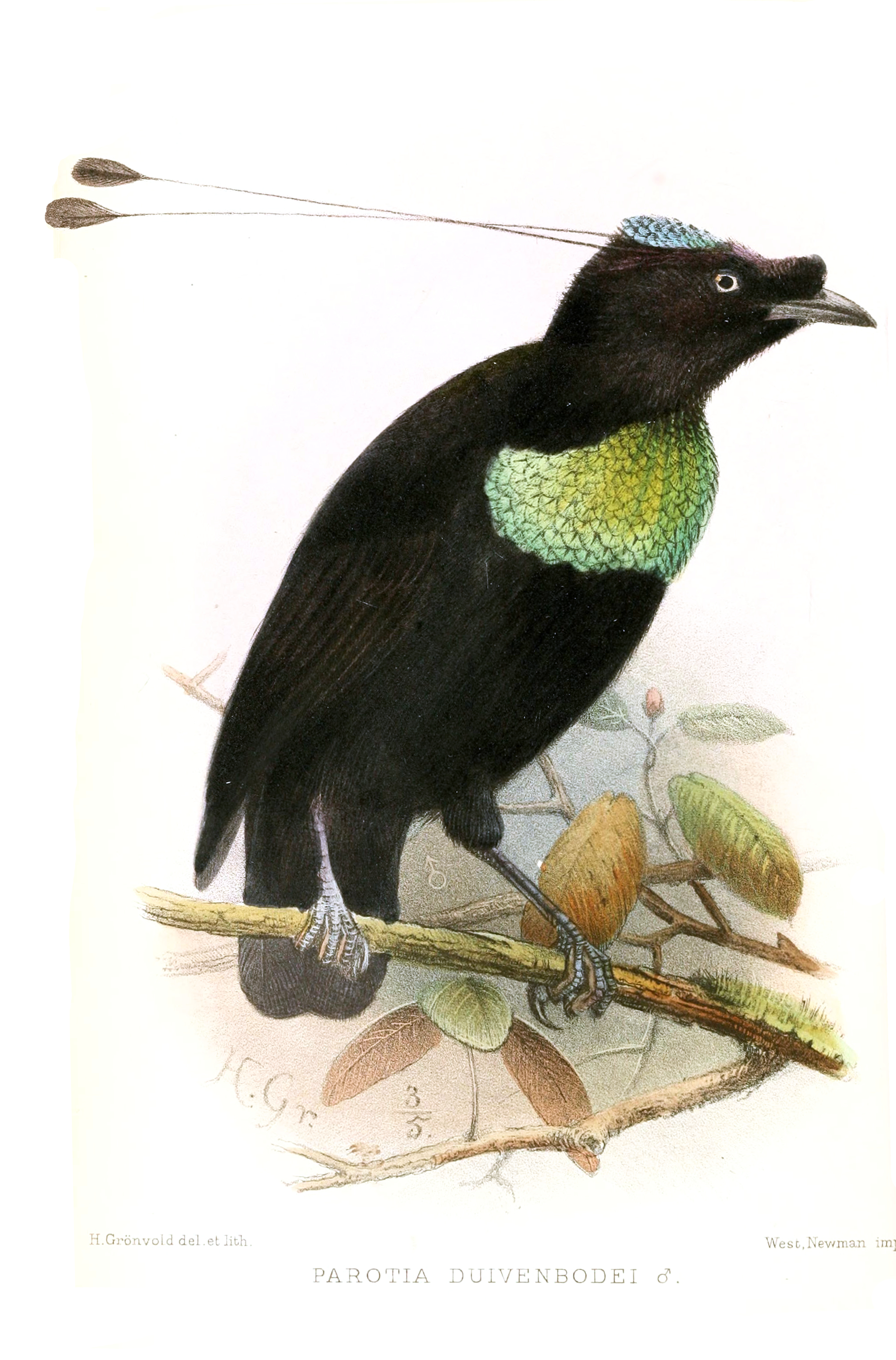

Scientific classification
- Domain: Eukaryota
- Kingdom: Animalia
- Phylum: Chordata
- Class: Aves
- Order: Passeriformes
- Superfamily: Corvoidea
- Family: Paradisaeidae
- Hybrid: Parotia sefilata × Lophorina superba

Synonyms
- Parotia duivenbodei Rothschild, 1900

= Duivenbode's six-wired bird-of-paradise =

Hybrid bird

Duivenbode's six-wired bird-of-paradise, also known as Duivenbode's six-plumed bird-of-paradise, is a bird in the family Paradisaeidae that is an intergeneric hybrid between a western parotia and greater lophorina. The common name commemorates Maarten Dirk van Renesse van Duivenbode (1804–1878), Dutch trader of naturalia on Ternate.

== History ==
Two adult male specimens are known of this hybrid, coming from the Geelvink Bay region of north-western New Guinea, and held in the American Museum of Natural History and the French Natural History Museum.
