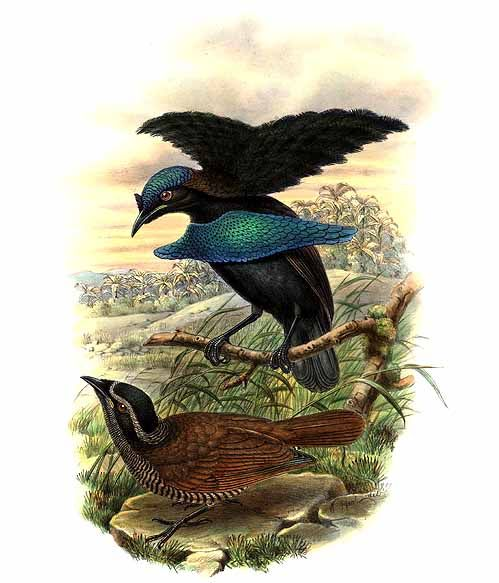
- Lesser lophorina (Lophorina minor)

Scientific classification
- Kingdom: Animalia
- Phylum: Chordata
- Class: Aves
- Order: Passeriformes
- Family: Paradisaeidae
- Genus: Lophorina; Vieillot, 1816

Type species
- Paradisea superba (Vogelkop lophorina) Pennant, 1781

= Lophorina =

Genus of birds

Lophorina is a genus of birds in the birds-of-paradise family Paradisaeidae that are endemic to New Guinea, formerly containing a single species, but as of 2017, containing three species.

== Taxonomy ==
The genus Lophorina was introduced in 1816 by the French ornithologist Louis Pierre Vieillot for a single species, Paradisea superba, the Vogelkop lophorina. This is now the type species. The genus name combines the Ancient Greek lophos meaning "crest" or "tuft" with rhis, rhinos meaning "nostrils. The genus formerly contained a single species, the superb bird-of-paradise, which had five subspecies. In 2017 the Swedish ornithologist Martin Irestedt and collaborators suggested that the superb bird-of-paradise should be split into three species. They also proposed a neotype from the Kobowre Mountains in New Guinea for the no longer extant type specimen for Paradisea superba. The original type specimen for superba had been assumed to come from the Bird's Head Peninsula (known as Vogelkop in Dutch and Indonesian). Although, the split was generally supported by other ornithologists, the designation of the neotype and the resulting assignment of subspecies were strongly disputed. The taxonomy adopted here rejects the designation of the neotype but splits the superb bird-of-paradise into three species.

The genus contains the following three species:

Image	Common name	Scientific name	Distribution
	Vogelkop lophorina	Lophorina superba	Montane northwest New Guinea.
	Greater lophorina	Lophorina latipennis	Central and northeast montane regions of New Guinea.
	Lesser lophorina	Lophorina minor	Endemic to the Bird's Tail Peninsula of Papua New Guinea.

== Description ==
All members sport a jet-black to black body found only in males, while their female counterparts sport brown upperparts (shade depends on the species) with barred underparts; they have a relatively long to shortish, slender, crow-like bill, and various ornaments. All three species have a distinctive cape found on the nape that they push forward, an iridescent blue-green crown, and an iridescent blue-greenish breast shield that appears to be "smiling" (L. superba) and "frowning" (L. niedda) that the males use to court females. When it comes to the courtship of the female lophorina, males tend to start crouching, showing a repeated display of their breast shield and an exaggerated downward movement to show their crown to the female. During a high intensity display, the male will also fan his nape cape, forming a semi-circle overhead, and around breast shield, all while hopping around the female. When in full display, the birds look like an otherworldly cartoon character with a fully black face, blue eyes, and blue mouth as they try their best to hop and dance around a potential mate.

== See also ==
- Bird-of-paradise
