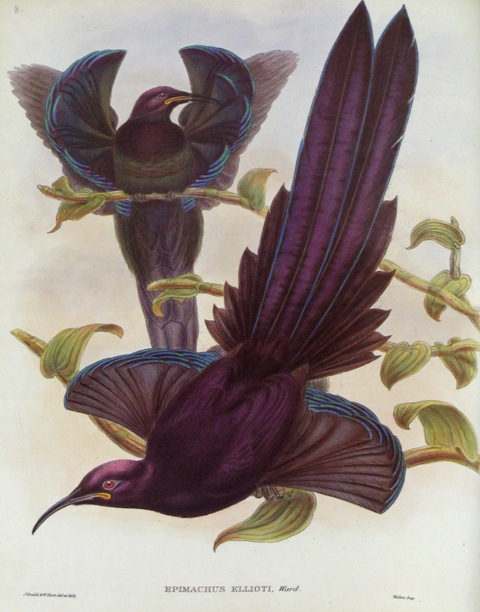
- Illustration by John Gould

Scientific classification
- Domain: Eukaryota
- Kingdom: Animalia
- Phylum: Chordata
- Class: Aves
- Order: Passeriformes
- Superfamily: Corvoidea
- Family: Paradisaeidae
- Hybrid: Epimachus fastosus × Paradigalla carunculata

Synonyms
- Epimachus ellioti Ward, 1873

= Elliot's bird-of-paradise =

Elliot's bird of paradise

Hybrid bird

Elliot's bird of paradise is a bird in the family Paradisaeidae, first described by Edward Ward in 1873, but which was later proposed to be a hybrid rather than a “real” species, an identity since confirmed by DNA analysis.

== History ==
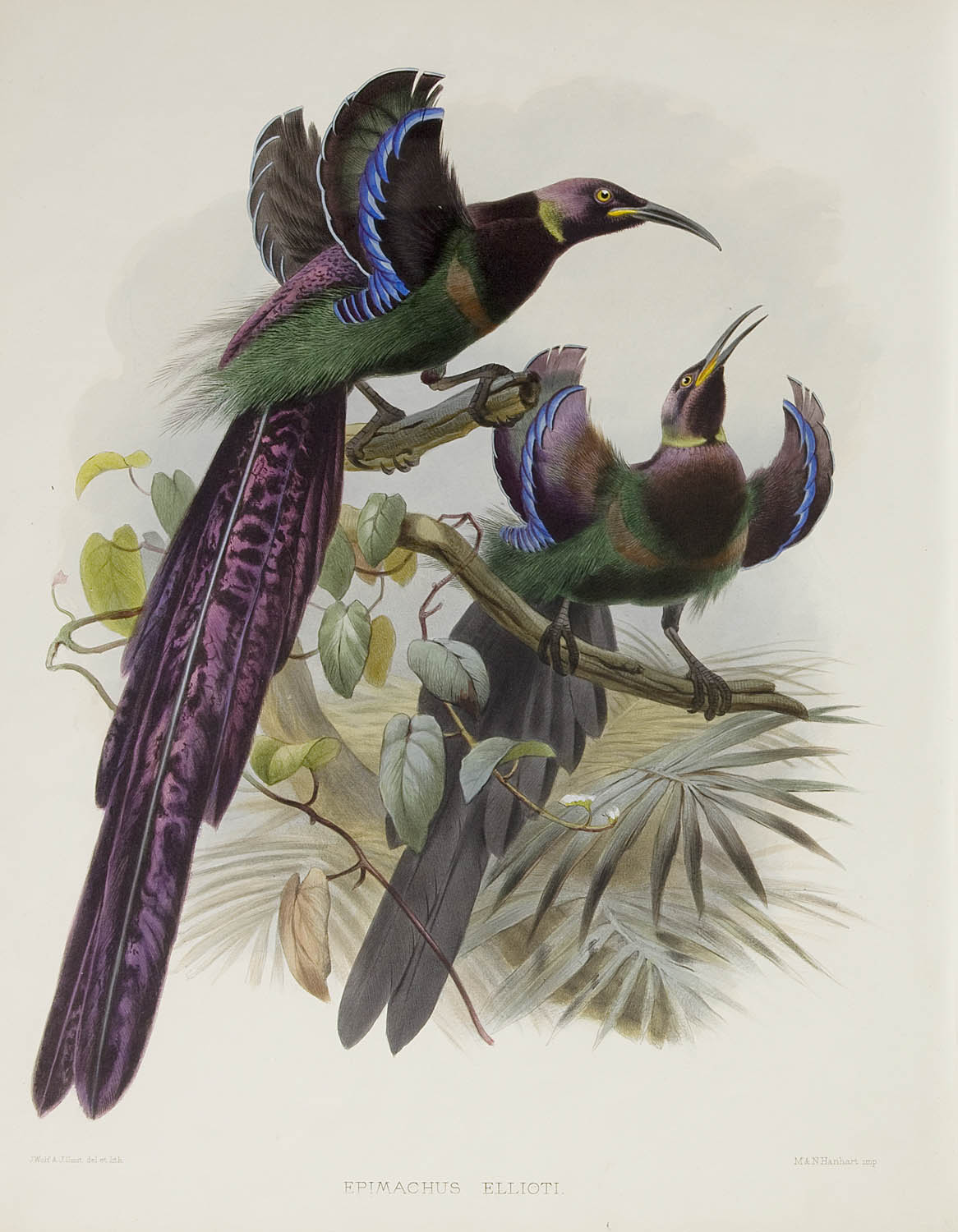
Illustration by J. Wolf and J. Smith

Only two adult male specimens are known of this bird, held in the British Natural History Museum (BMNH) and the Dresden Natural History Museum, and presumably deriving from the Vogelkop Peninsula of north-western New Guinea. In 1930, Erwin Stresemann inspected both specimens and declared Elliot's Bird of Paradise to be an intergeneric hybrid between a black sicklebill and Arfak astrapia. Other ornithologists dispute this claim. Errol Fuller argues that the astrapia is a fanciful choice made with little supporting evidence, and that Elliot's Bird of Paradise is much smaller than the two proposed parent species. The specimens show a number of characteristics not present in either parent species, adding weight to the possibility of the specimens constituting a unique species. As recently as 2012, Julian Hume and Michael Walters suggested that it is likely the elusive bird is either rare or extinct. In 2024 a study which extracted DNA from the BMNH specimen confirmed that the astrapia parentage is incorrect, but revealed it to actually be an F1 hybrid between a long-tailed paradigalla and a black sicklebill.
