= Ruys's bird-of-paradise =

Scientific classification
- Domain: Eukaryota
- Kingdom: Animalia
- Phylum: Chordata
- Class: Aves
- Order: Passeriformes
- Superfamily: Corvoidea
- Family: Paradisaeidae
- Hybrid: Diphyllodes magnificus × Paradisaea minor

Synonyms
- Neoparadisaea ruysi van Oort, 1906

Hybrid bird

Ruys's bird-of-paradise is a bird in the family Paradisaeidae that is presumed to be an intergeneric hybrid between a magnificent bird-of-paradise and lesser bird-of-paradise, an identity since confirmed by DNA analysis.

== History ==
Only one adult male specimen is known of this hybrid; it is held in the Netherlands Natural History Museum in Leiden, and comes from near Warsembo, on the west coast of Geelvink Bay, in north-western New Guinea.
