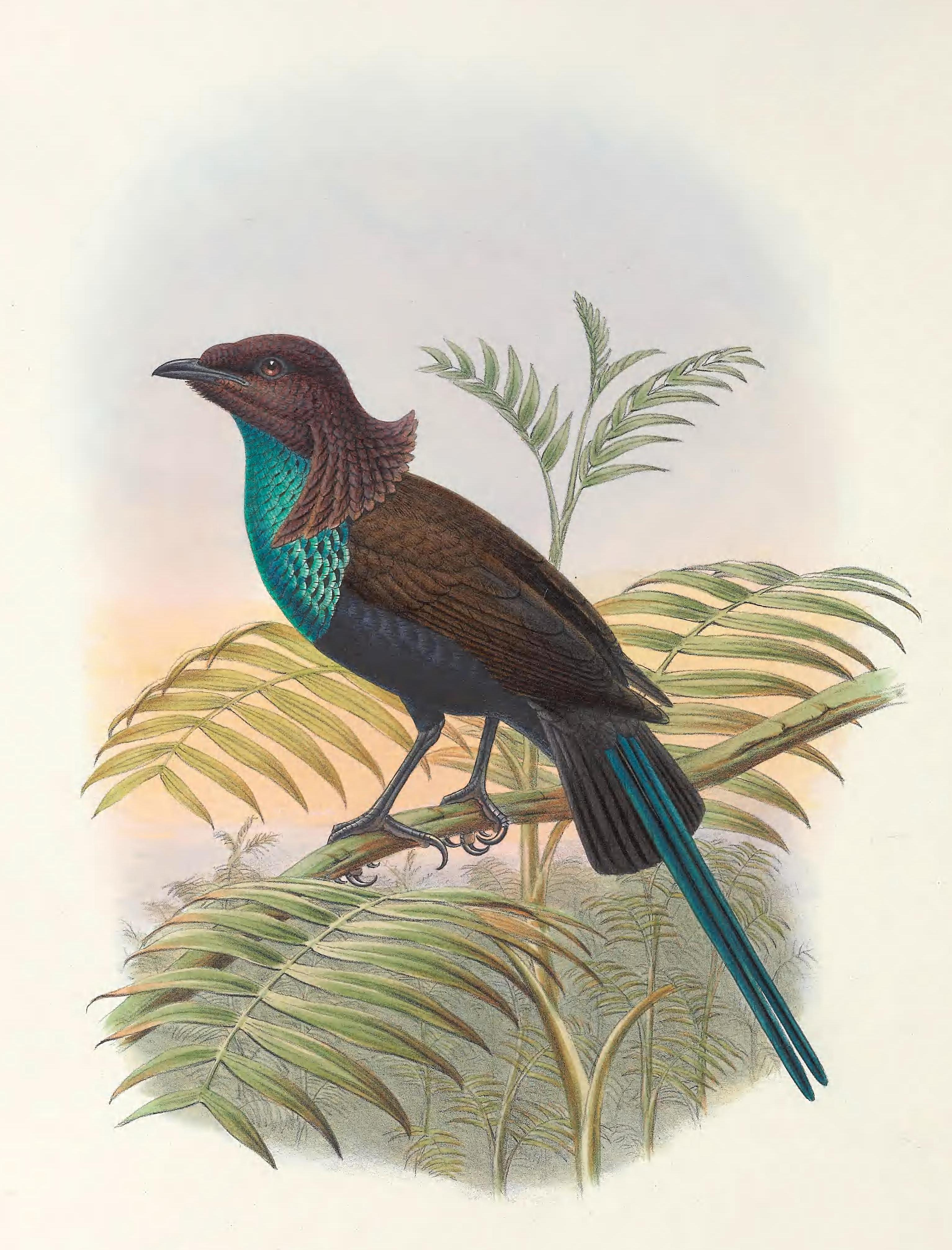

Scientific classification
- Domain: Eukaryota
- Kingdom: Animalia
- Phylum: Chordata
- Class: Aves
- Order: Passeriformes
- Superfamily: Corvoidea
- Family: Paradisaeidae
- Hybrid: Lophorina superba × Cicinnurus magnificus

Synonyms
- Lamprothorax wilhelminae Meyer, 1894

= Wilhelmina's bird-of-paradise =

Hybrid bird

Wilhelmina's bird-of-paradise, also known as Wilhelmina's riflebird, is a bird in the family Paradisaeidae that Erwin Stresemann proposed is an intergeneric hybrid between a greater lophorina and magnificent bird-of-paradise, an identity since confirmed by DNA analysis.

== History ==
Three adult male specimens are known of this hybrid, held in the American Museum of Natural History, Royal Natural History Museum of the Netherlands, and the State Museum of Zoology, Dresden. Two of the specimens come from the Arfak Mountains of north-western New Guinea, while the other is of unknown provenance. The bird was named as a species by Adolf Bernhard Meyer in 1894 after Wilhelmine, his wife who joined him during his travels in 1870–1872.
