= Lupton's bird-of-paradise =

Scientific classification
- Domain: Eukaryota
- Kingdom: Animalia
- Phylum: Chordata
- Class: Aves
- Order: Passeriformes
- Family: Paradisaeidae
- Genus: Paradisaea
- Species: P. apoda × P. raggiana

Synonyms
- Paradisaea apoda luptoni Lowe, 1923

Hybrid bird

Lupton's bird-of-paradise is a bird in the family Paradisaeidae that is a hybrid between a greater bird-of-paradise and raggiana bird-of-paradise. It was described by Percy Lowe in 1923 as a subspecies of the greater bird-of-paradise, though he also noted the possibility of hybridisation.

== History ==
This hybrid is known from many adult male specimens taken from the Fly River region of southern New Guinea.
