= Blood's bird-of-paradise =

Scientific classification
- Domain: Eukaryota
- Kingdom: Animalia
- Phylum: Chordata
- Class: Aves
- Order: Passeriformes
- Family: Paradisaeidae
- Genus: Paradisaea
- Species: P. raggiana × P. rudolphi

Synonyms
- Paradisaea bloodi Iredale, 1948

Hybrid bird

Blood's bird-of-paradise, also known as Captain Blood's bird-of-paradise, is a bird in the family Paradisaeidae that is a hybrid between a raggiana bird-of-paradise and blue bird-of-paradise. It is named after Captain N.B. Blood who obtained the specimen through his travels in the East.

== History ==
Only one specimen, an adult male, of this hybrid is known. It comes from the Mount Hagen area in Papua New Guinea and is held in the Australian Museum in Sydney.
