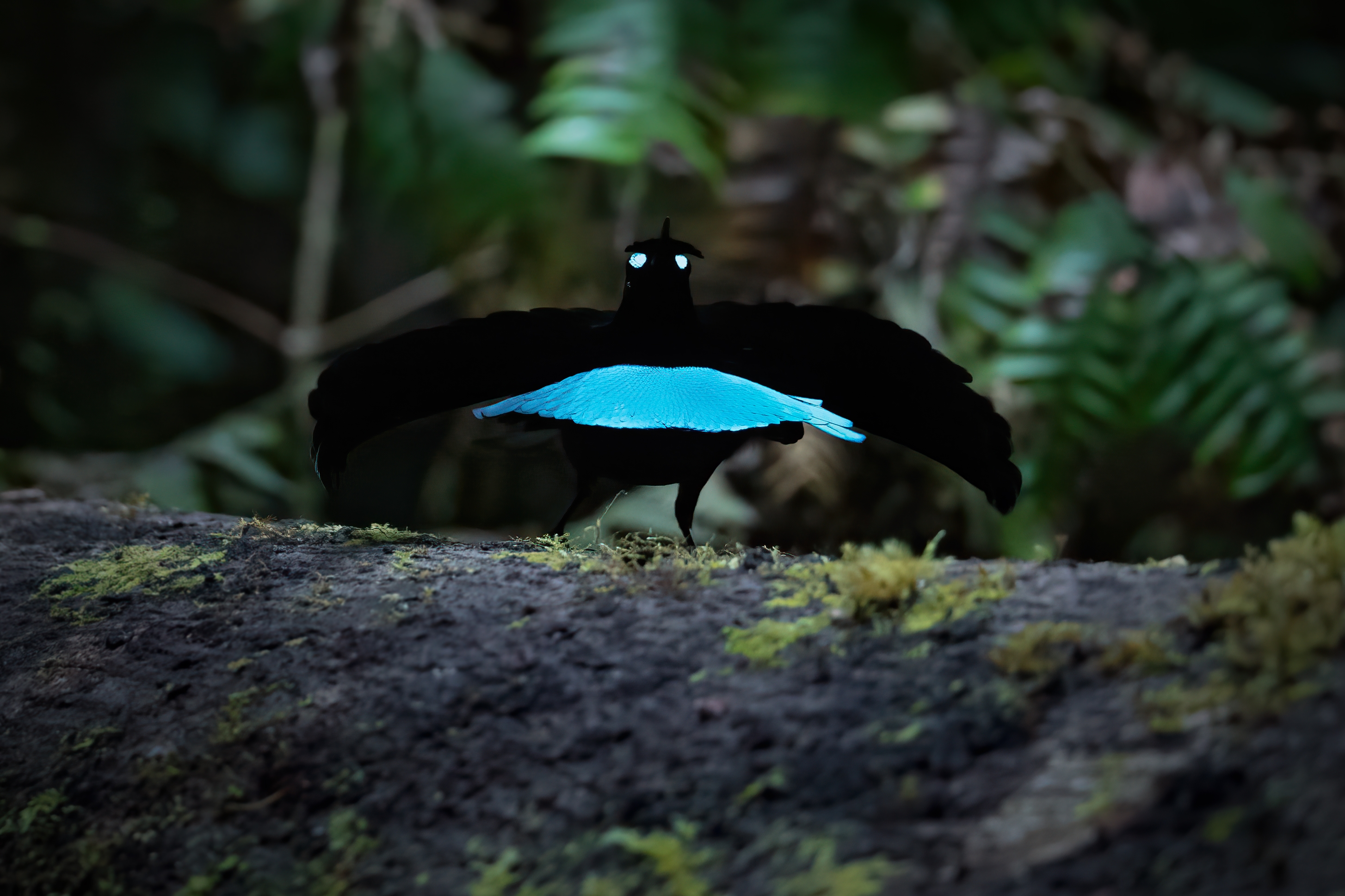
- Male Greater Lophorina displaying
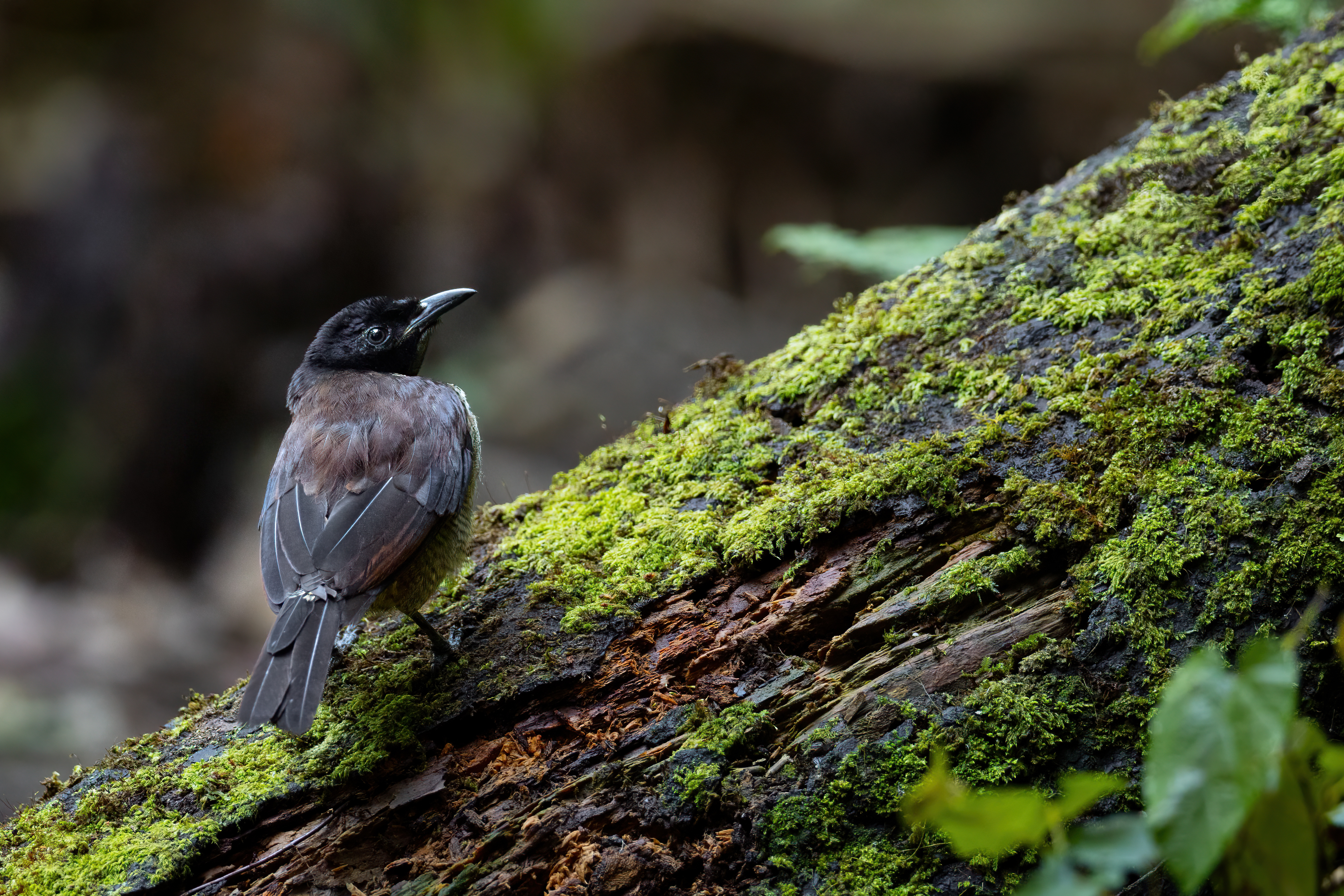
- Female

Conservation status
- Least Concern (IUCN 3.1)

Scientific classification
- Kingdom: Animalia
- Phylum: Chordata
- Class: Aves
- Order: Passeriformes
- Family: Paradisaeidae
- Genus: Lophorina
- Species: L. superba

Binomial name
- Lophorina superba (Pennant, 1781)

Synonyms
- Paradisea superba Pennant, 1781

= Vogelkop lophorina =

Species of bird

The Vogelkop lophorina (Lophorina superba), formerly part of the superb bird-of-paradise complex, is a species of passerine bird in the bird-of-paradise family Paradisaeidae. It is found in montane northwest New Guinea.

== Taxonomy ==
The Vogelkop lophorina was given the binomial name Paradisea superba in 1781 in a book which has the German naturalist Johann Reinhold Forster on the title page. The binomial name is accompanied by a cite to a hand coloured plate engraved by François-Nicolas Martinet that had been included in Edme-Louis Daubenton's Planches Enluminées D'Histoire Naturelle. The authorship of the text is disputed. The book originated as a project by the Welsh naturalist Thomas Pennant and it is uncertain how much was contributed by Forster and how much by Pennant. The specimen depicted in the plate had been acquired in 1772 by French naturalist Pierre Sonnerat when it had been gifted to him on the small island of Gebe. The island lies between North Maluku and New Guinea. On his return to Paris he presented his specimens to the Cabinet du Roi.

The Vogelkop lophorina was formerly the nominate subspecies of the "superb bird-of-paradise" species complex. In 2017 the Swedish ornithologist Martin Irestedt and collaborators suggested that the superb bird-of-paradise should be split into three species. They also proposed a neotype from the Kobowre Mountains in New Guinea for the no longer extant type specimen for Paradisea superba. The original type specimen for superba had been assumed to come from the Bird's Head Peninsula (known as Vogelkop in Dutch and Indonesian). Although, the split was generally supported by other ornithologists, the designation of the neotype and the resulting assignment of subspecies were strongly disputed. The taxonomy adopted here rejects the designation of the neotype but splits the superb bird-of-paradise into three species.

Two subspecies are recognised:

- L. s. superba (Pennant, 1781) – Bird south Head Peninsula (west New Guinea)
- L. s. niedda Mayr, 1930 – Wandammen Peninsula (Bird south Neck, northwest New Guinea) (previously crescent-caped lophorina)

== Description ==
It is a small, approximately 26 cm (about 10 inches) long, (passerine) bird. The male is black with an iridescent green crown, blue-green breast cover, and a long velvety black erectile cape covering his back. The female is a reddish-brown bird with brownish-barred buff below. The young is similar to the female. The Vogelkop lophorina is a dimorphic species.

== Distribution and habitat ==
The Vogelkop lophorina is distributed throughout the rainforests of New Guinea. It inhabits most commonly in rain forests or forest edges of Indonesia and Papua New Guinea. They can also be found inhabiting mountainous habitats of the forests in New Guinea.

The Vogelkop lophorina is also usually found on top of the trees that reside in the rain forests.

== Behavior and ecology ==
=== Diet ===
The Vogelkop lophorina travels across the trees in the forest to catch its prey, which can vary depending on seasonal availability of food. The Vogelkop lophorina has not only been known to eat fruits and insects, but also has been spotted preying on larger animals such as frogs, reptiles, and other small birds. They can sometimes be seen foraging for food on the grounds of the forest for insects. Males are considered to be territorial, as they defend land as small as 1.2 ha. Within that land, they forage for fruits and insects.

=== Predators ===
Known predators of the superb bird-of-paradise include birds of prey and snakes.

=== Reproduction and life cycle ===
The Vogelkop lophorina forms its nest on top of trees using soft material that they find around the forest such as leaves. When reproducing, it usually produces 1-3 eggs within a nest. It takes about 16–22 days for chicks to hatch from the eggs. After that, chicks will be able to live on their own within 16–30 days, leaving their nest and becoming independent. Male superb birds-of-paradise tend to take about two years longer to mature compared to the females, and it takes 4–7 years for them to develop their feathers for their courtship displays.

==== Courtship ====
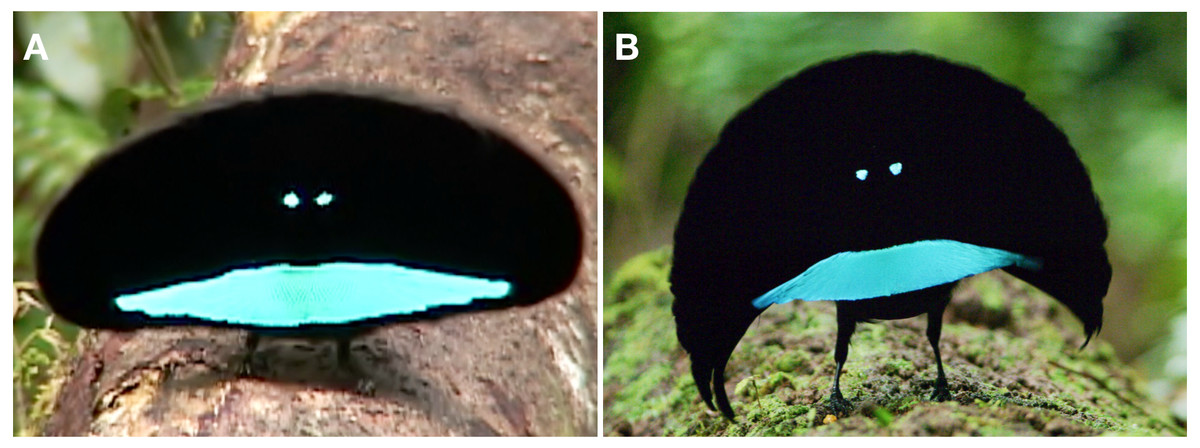
An open-winged Vogelkop lophorina

The species has an unusually low population of females, and competition among males for mates is intensely fierce. This has led the species to have one of the most elaborate courtship displays in the avian world. There are two main stages of courtship display. The first display, known as the initial display activity, involves a series of relatively simple behaviours. The initial display is then followed by a more elaborate courtship show, known as the high-intensity display. After carefully and meticulously preparing a "dance floor" (even scrubbing the dirt or branch smooth with leaves), the male first attracts a female with a loud call. After the curious female approaches, his folded black feather cape and blue-green chest feathers shield spring upward and spread widely and symmetrically around his head, instantly transforming the frontal view of the male bird into a spectacular ellipse-shaped creature that rhythmically snaps his tail feathers against each other, similar to how snapping fingers work, while hopping in frantic circles around the female. The average female rejects 15-20 potential suitors before consenting to mate. The show that males put on to attract females can be a long process that takes up many hours in a day. These species are polygynous and usually will mate with more than one female.

== Conservation status ==
Although heavily hunted for its plumes it is evaluated as Least Concern on the IUCN Red List of Threatened Species. It is listed on Appendix II of CITES.
