= Mysterious bird of Bobairo =

Scientific classification
- Kingdom: Animalia
- Phylum: Chordata
- Class: Aves
- Order: Passeriformes
- Superfamily: Corvoidea
- Family: Paradisaeidae
- Hybrid: Epimachus fastuosus atratus × Lophorina superba feminina

The mysterious bird of Bobairo, named as such by Errol Fuller, is a bird in the family Paradisaeidae that is presumed to be an intergeneric hybrid between a black sicklebill and greater lophorina. Only one adult male specimen is known of this bird, and is held in the Netherlands National Museum of Natural History in Leiden. It derives from Bobairo, near Enarotali on Lake Paniai in the Weyland Mountains of Western New Guinea.

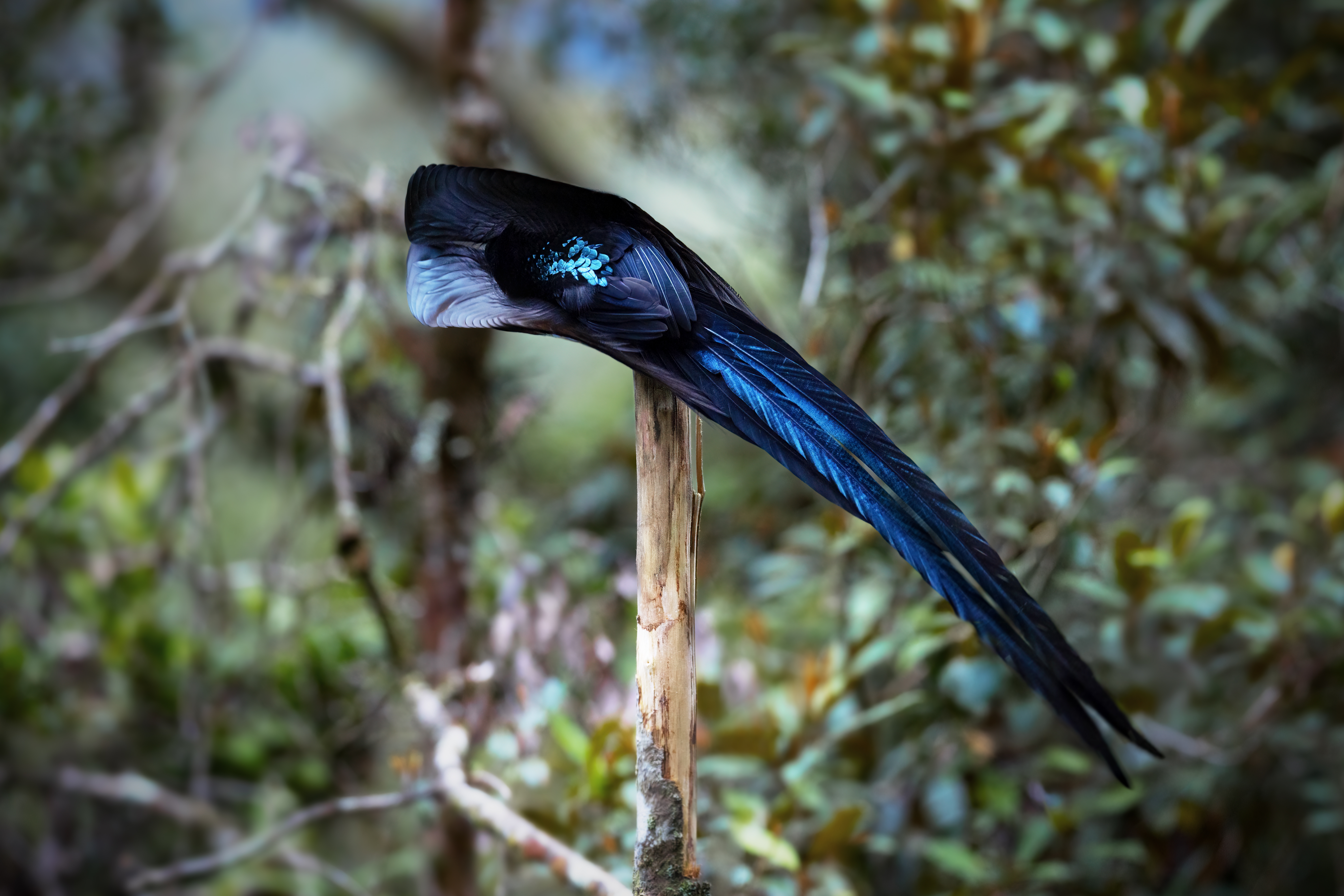
Black sicklebill

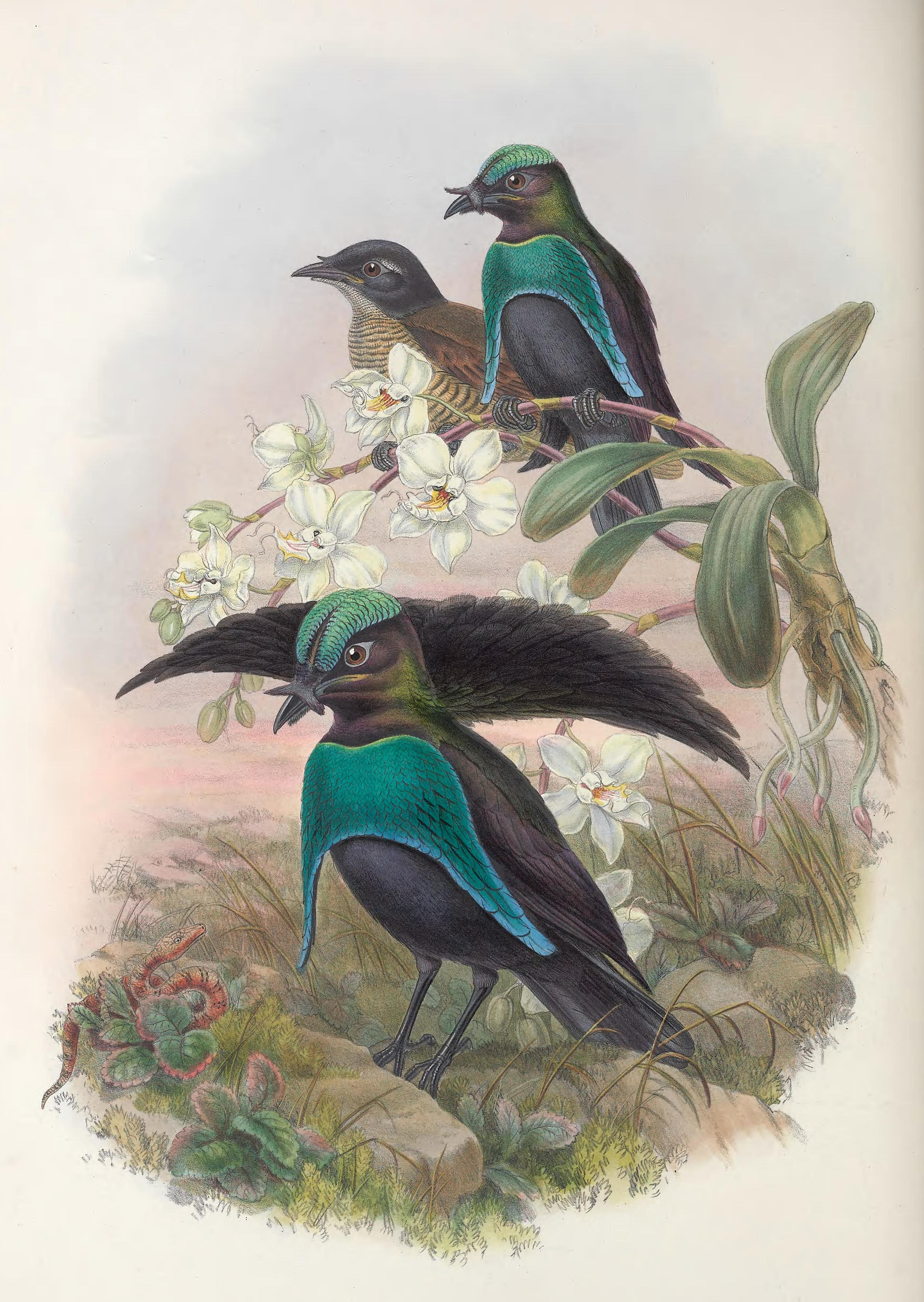
Greater lophorina
