= Stresemann's bird-of-paradise =

Scientific classification
- Kingdom: Animalia
- Phylum: Chordata
- Class: Aves
- Order: Passeriformes
- Superfamily: Corvoidea
- Family: Paradisaeidae
- Hybrid: Parotia carolae × Lophorina superba

Synonyms
- Lophorina superba pseudoparotia Stresemann, 1934

Hybrid bird

Stresemann's bird-of-paradise is a bird in the family Paradisaeidae that is an intergeneric hybrid between a Queen Carola's parotia and greater lophorina.

== History ==
Only one female specimen is known of this hybrid, held in the Berlin Natural History Museum, coming from Mount Hunstein in the Sepik district of north-eastern New Guinea. It was first identified as a female Carola's Parotia in 1923 and later, in 1934, described as a subspecies of the Superb Bird of Paradise; it is named for its original identifier and later describer, German ornithologist Erwin Stresemann.
