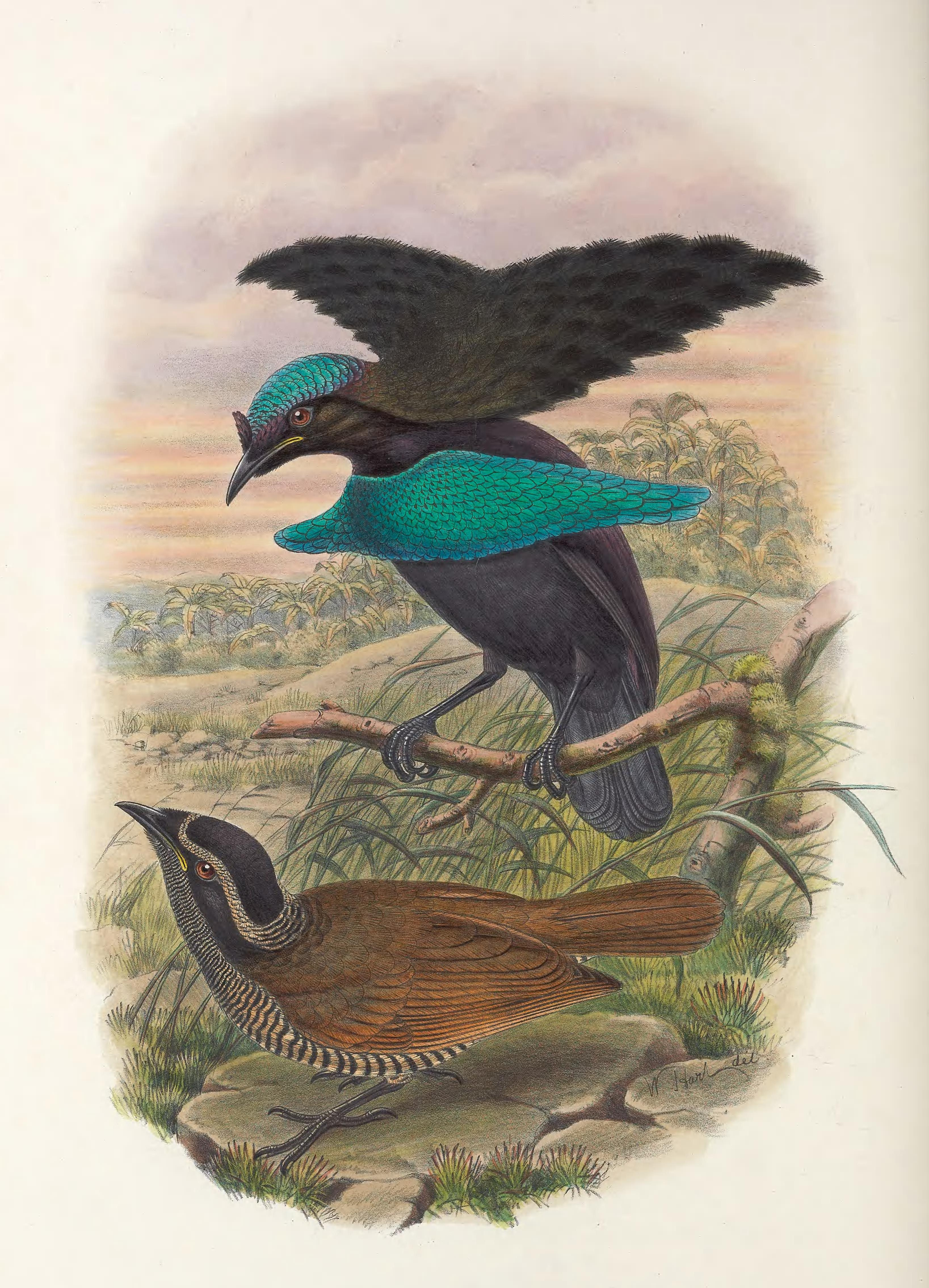

Conservation status
- Least Concern (IUCN 3.1)

Scientific classification
- Kingdom: Animalia
- Phylum: Chordata
- Class: Aves
- Order: Passeriformes
- Family: Paradisaeidae
- Genus: Lophorina
- Species: L. minor

Binomial name
- Lophorina minor Ramsay, EP, 1885

Synonyms
- Lophorina superba sphinx Neumann, 1932; Lophorina superba lehunti Rothschild, 1932

= Lesser lophorina =

Species of bird

The lesser lophorina (Lophorina minor), also known as lesser superb bird-of-paradise or rasping bird-of-paradise, is a species of passerine bird in the bird-of-paradise family Paradisaeidae.

It is endemic to the Bird's Tail Peninsula (Papua New Guinea). It was formerly considered as a subspecies of the superb bird-of-paradise, and elevated to species rank in 2017.

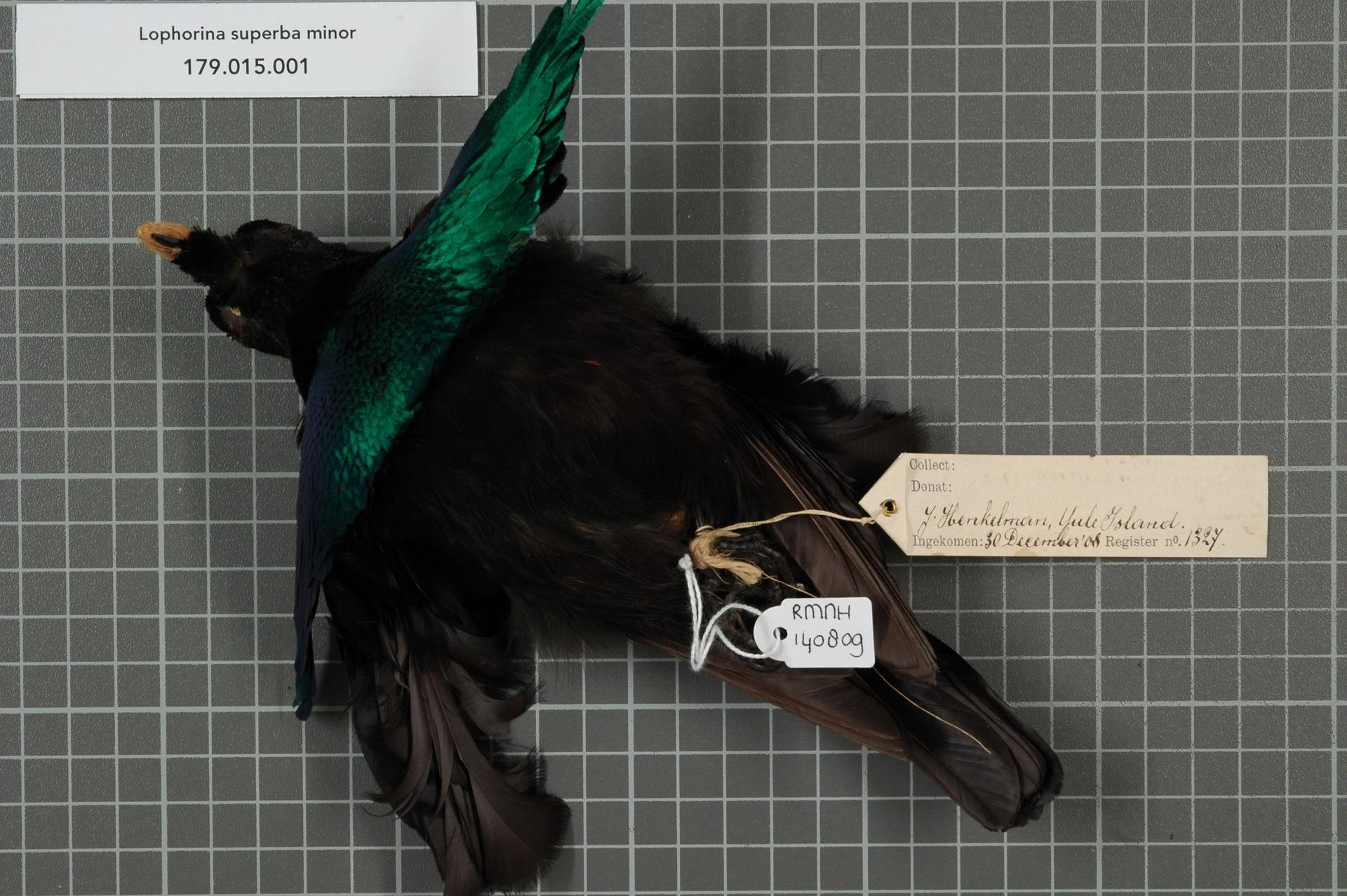
Male Lophorina minor.
