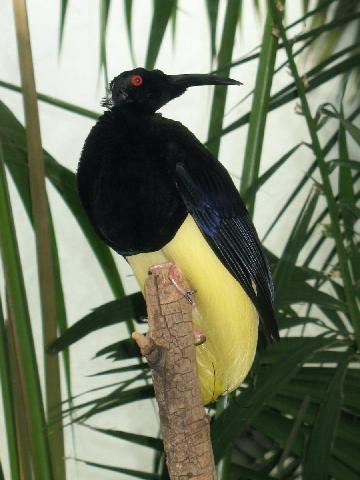
- Male

Conservation status
- Least Concern (IUCN 3.1)

Scientific classification
- Kingdom: Animalia
- Phylum: Chordata
- Class: Aves
- Order: Passeriformes
- Family: Paradisaeidae
- Genus: Seleucidis; Lesson, RP, 1834
- Species: S. melanoleucus

Binomial name
- Seleucidis melanoleucus (Daudin, 1800)

Subspecies
- S. m. auripennis; S. m. melanoleucus

Synonyms
- References: Paradisea melanoleuca, Daudin; Seleucidis acanthilis, Lesson; Paradisea alba, Blum.; Paradisea nigricans, Shaw; Epimachus albus; Falcinellus resplendescens, Less.

= Twelve-wired bird-of-paradise =

Species of bird

The twelve-wired bird-of-paradise (Seleucidis melanoleucus) is a medium-sized, approximately 33 cm (13 in) long, velvet black and yellow bird-of-paradise. The male has a red iris, long black bill and rich yellow plumes along his flanks. From the rear of these plumes emerge twelve blackish, wire-like filaments, which bend back near their bases to sweep forward over the bird's hindquarters. The female is a brown bird with black-barred buff underparts. Their feet are strong, large-clawed and pink.

The sole representative of the monotypic genus Seleucidis, the twelve-wired bird-of-paradise inhabits lowland and swamp forests, particularly throughout New Guinea and Salawati Island, Indonesia. Their diet consists mainly of fruits and arthropods, extending to frogs, insects, and nectar.

The display dance of the twelve-wired bird of paradise is called a wire-wipe display. The male chooses an exposed vertical perch, flares his breast-shield, and displays his flank plumes and bare pigmented thighs. The male uses his twelve flank-plume "wires" to make contact with the female, brushing across her face and foreparts.

The twelve-wired bird-of-paradise is evaluated as Least Concern on the IUCN Red List of Threatened Species, and is listed on Appendix II of CITES. It has not been easy to breed them in captivity; the first successful captive breeding program was at Singapore's Jurong Bird Park, in 2001.

== Gallery ==
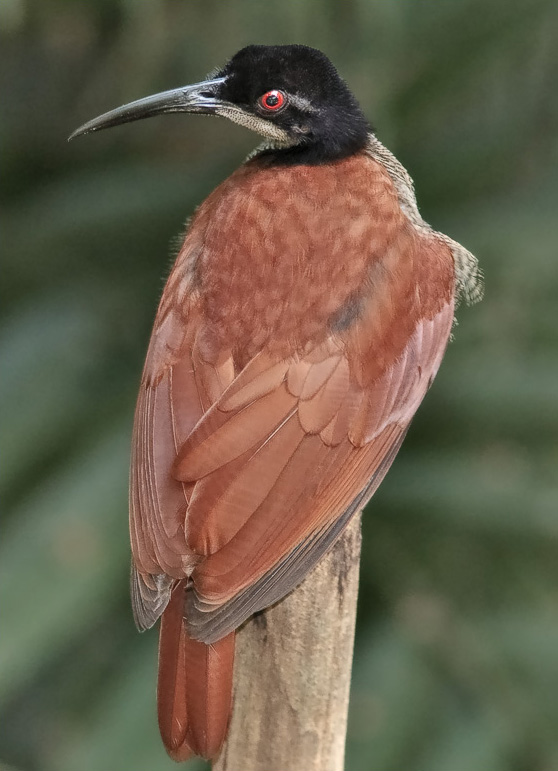
Female

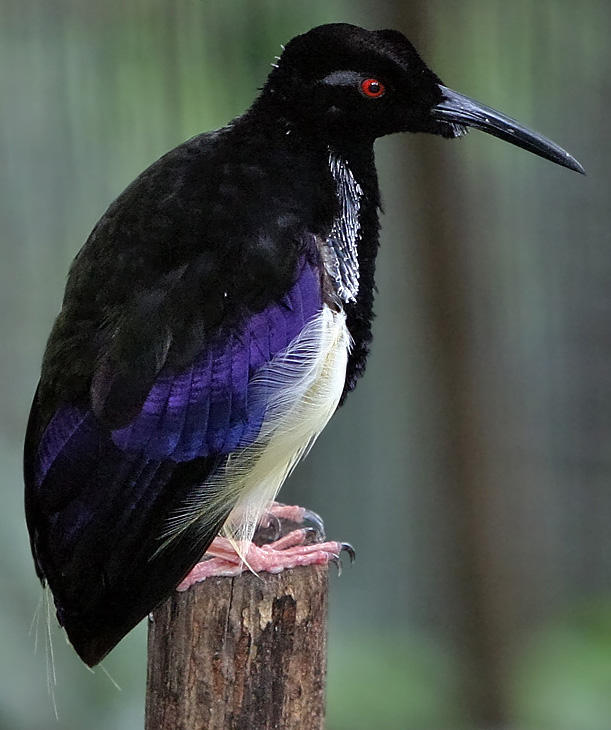
A male in Jurong Bird Park
