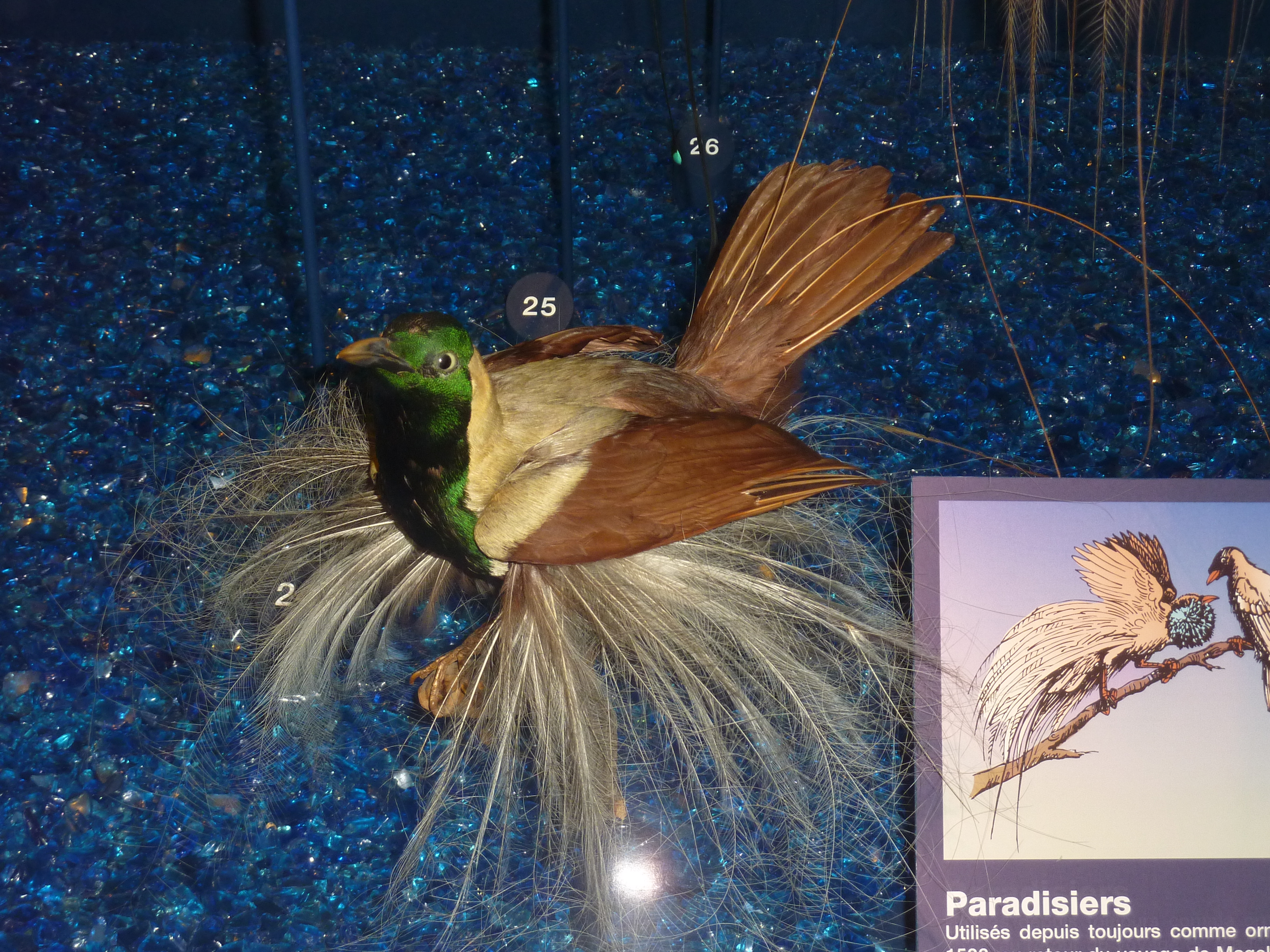
- Male (taxidermy mount)

Conservation status
- Near Threatened (IUCN 3.1)

Scientific classification
- Kingdom: Animalia
- Phylum: Chordata
- Class: Aves
- Order: Passeriformes
- Family: Paradisaeidae
- Genus: Paradisaea
- Species: P. guilielmi

Binomial name
- Paradisaea guilielmi Cabanis, 1888

= Emperor bird-of-paradise =

Species of bird

The emperor bird-of-paradise (Paradisaea guilielmi), also known as emperor of Germany's bird-of-paradise, is a species of bird-of-paradise.

The emperor bird-of-paradise is endemic to Papua New Guinea. It is distributed in hill forests of the Huon Peninsula. The diet consists mainly of fruits, figs and arthropods.

The name commemorates the last German Emperor and King of Prussia, Wilhelm II. In January 1888, the emperor bird-of-paradise was the last bird-of-paradise discovered by Carl Hunstein, who also found the blue bird-of-paradise on his journeys. These two species, along with the red bird-of-paradise, are the only Paradisaea that perform inverted display.

Due to ongoing habitat loss, limited range and overhunting in some areas, the emperor bird-of-paradise is evaluated as Near Threatened on the IUCN Red List of Threatened Species. It is listed on Appendix II of CITES.

== Description ==
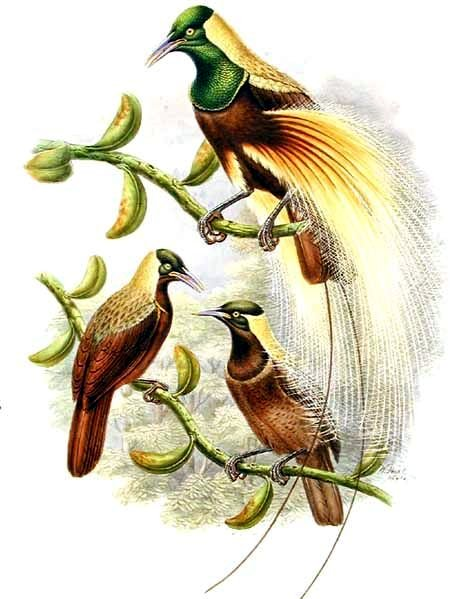
A drawing of the emperor bird-of-paradise.

The emperor bird-of-paradise is large, approximately 33 cm long, yellow and brown with a reddish-brown iris, bluish-grey bill and purplish-brown legs. The male has an extensive dark emerald green face and throat, two very long tail wires and large white ornamental flank plumes. The female is almost similar to the male, but has an all brown plumage, smaller in size and has no ornamental plumes.
