= State Museum of Zoology, Dresden =

Natural history museum in Germany

Coordinates: 51°07′44″N 13°47′24″E

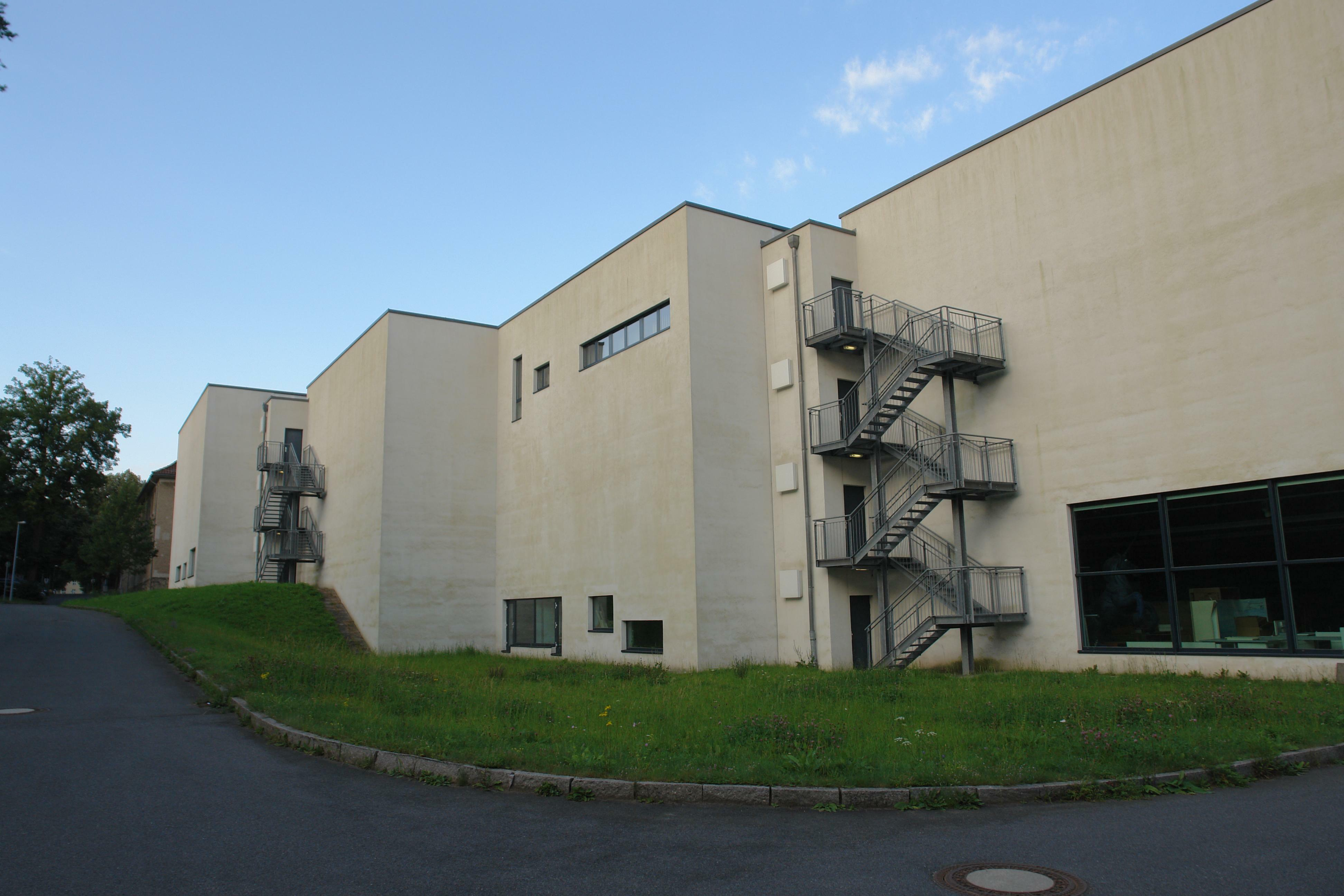
The building in Klotzsche

State Museum of Zoology, Dresden

The State Museum of Zoology (German: Staatliches Museum für Tierkunde) in Dresden is a natural history museum that houses 10,000–50,000 specimens, including skeletons and large insect collections. Many are types. The collection suffered war damage and whilst catalogued the database is not computerized. Loans are possible and material can be studied in the collection. The address is Augustusstrasse 2, D-01067 Dresden, Germany. The museum's collections contain more than 6 million items from all over the world.

The museum publishes the scientific journal Vertebrate Zoology.
