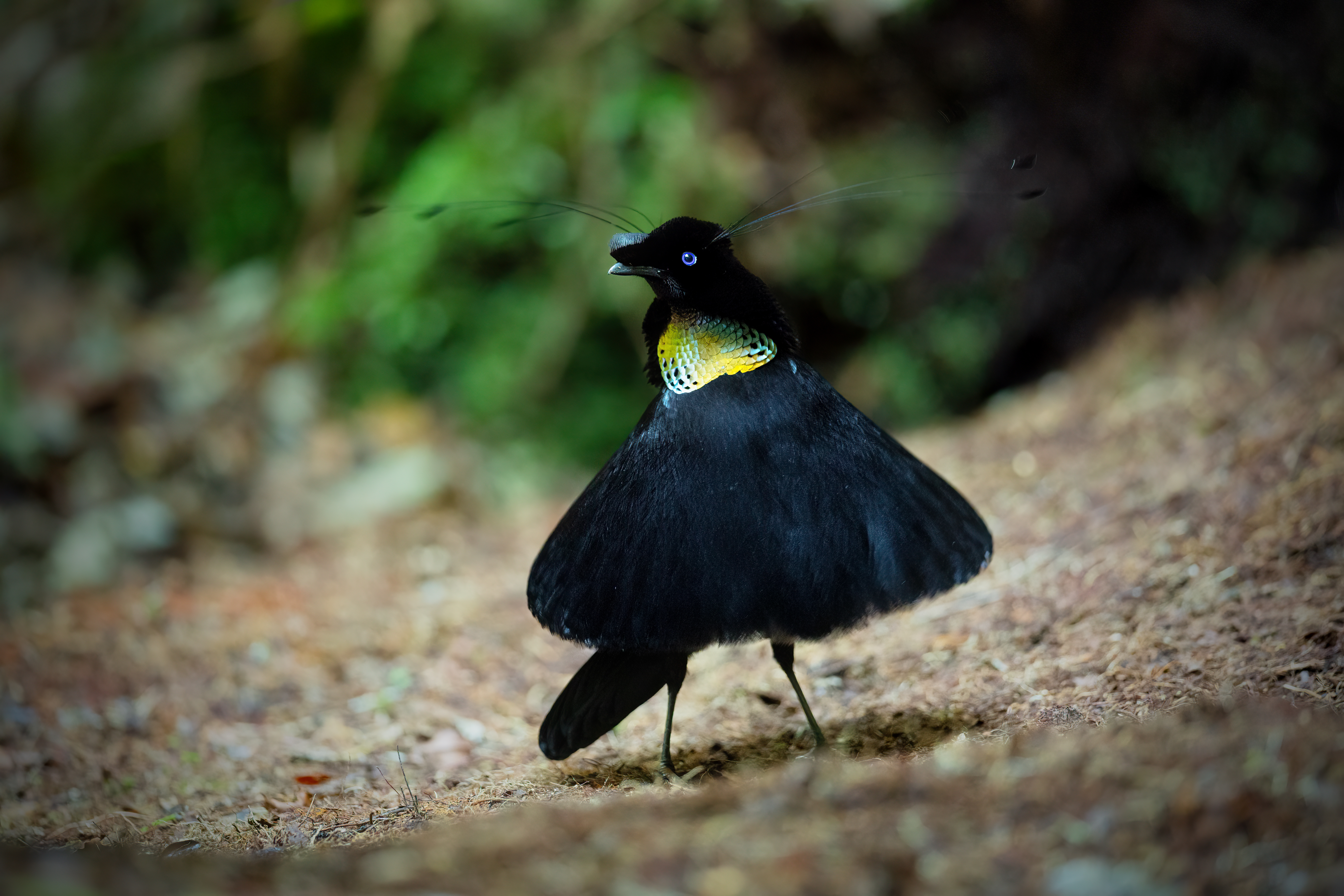
- male
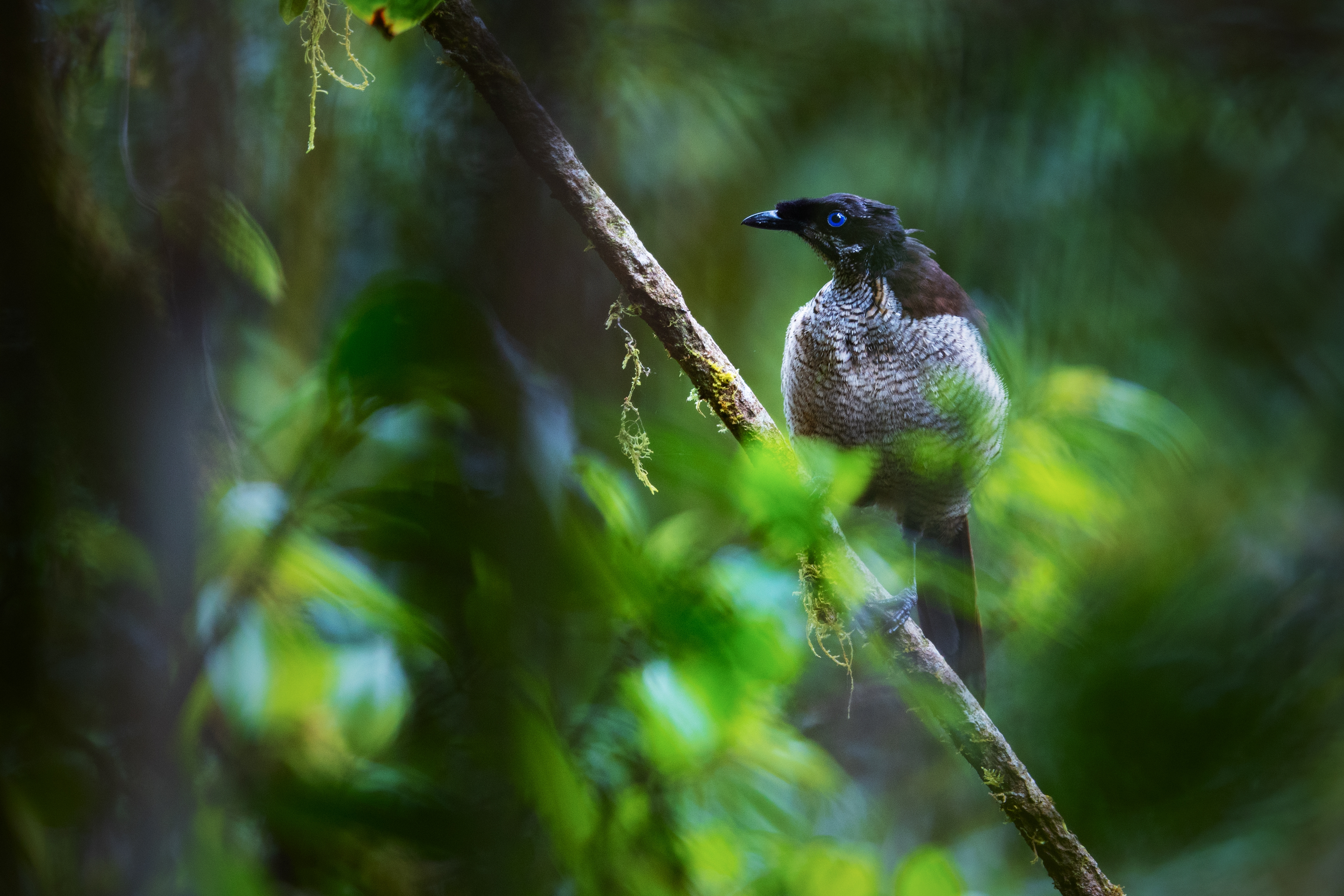
- female

Conservation status
- Least Concern (IUCN 3.1)

Scientific classification
- Kingdom: Animalia
- Phylum: Chordata
- Class: Aves
- Order: Passeriformes
- Family: Paradisaeidae
- Genus: Parotia
- Species: P. sefilata

Binomial name
- Parotia sefilata (Pennant, 1781)

= Western parotia =

Species of bird

The western or Arfak parotia (Parotia sefilata) is a medium-sized, approximately 33 cm long, bird-of-paradise with a medium-length tail.

Parotia comes from the Greek parotis, a lock or curl of hair by the ear, alluding to the head wires. The specific name sefilata is derived from the Latin word 'sex', meaning six, and filum, a thread or filament.

== Description ==
Like other birds-of-paradise, the western parotia is sexually dimorphic. The male has jet black plumage, with striking iridescent scale-like golden-green breast shields and triangular silver feathers on its crown. The occipital plumes (or head wires) arise from above and behind the eyes, with three long erectile wire-like plumes with smaller spatulate tips, above and behind each eye. As with most members of the family, the female is unadorned and has brown plumage. The species is similar to Lawes's parotia (Parotia lawesii).

== Distribution ==
The western parotia is found only in the mountain forests of Vogelkop and the Wandammen Peninsula of Western New Guinea.

== Behaviour ==
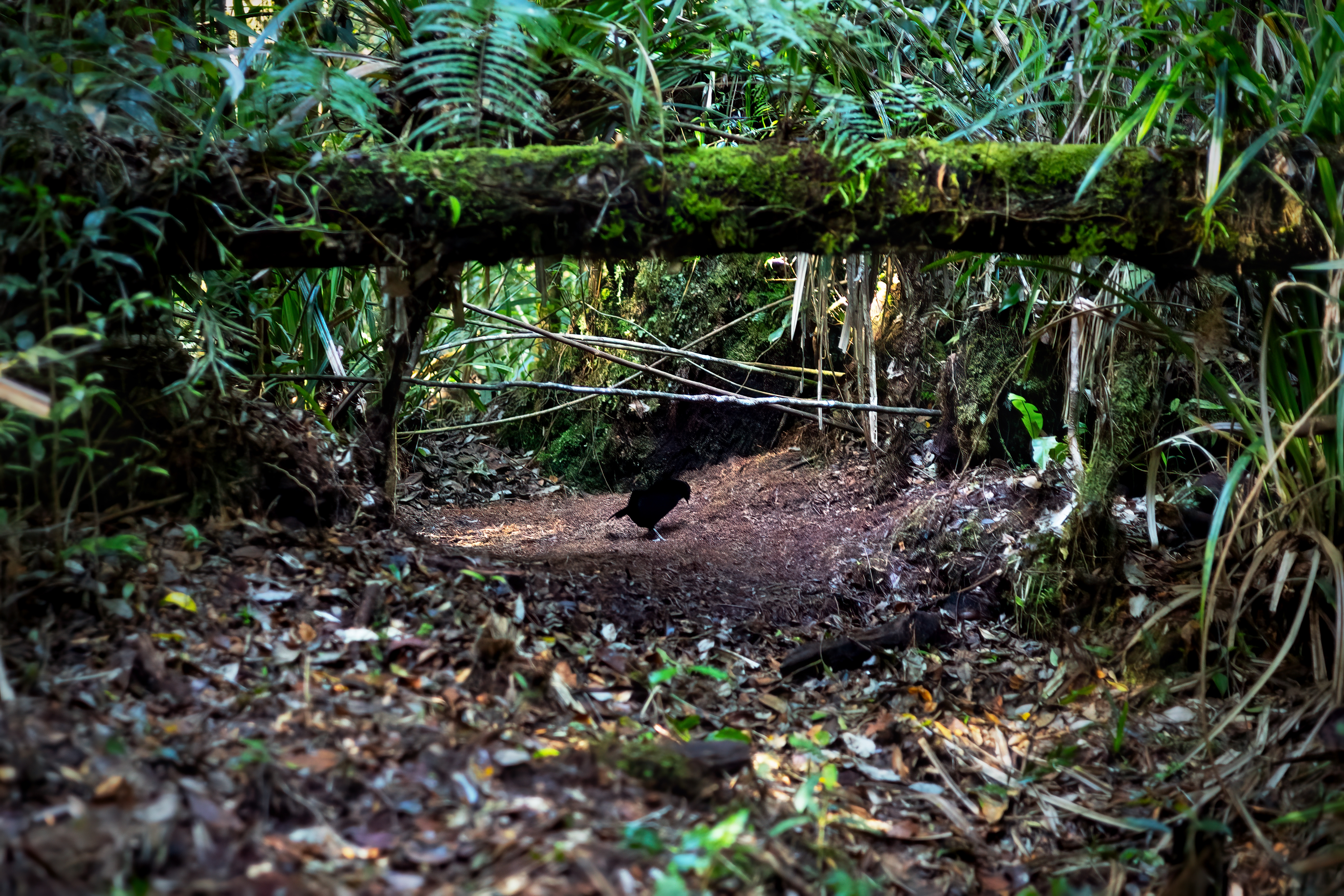
Western Parotia at his court

The species is polygynous. Males presumably perform a series of courtship displays likely on terrestrial courts in exploded leks.

In courtship display, the male performs a ballerina-like dance with its elongated black plumes spread skirt-like, right below the iridescent breast shield. During the spectacular dance, he shakes his head and neck rapidly to show the brilliance of his inverted silver triangle-shaped head adornment to attending females.

The nest is built and attended by the female alone; the breeding season is largely unknown.

The diet consists mainly of fruits such as figs, and arthropods.

== Status ==
A widespread and common species throughout its range, the western parotia is evaluated as Least Concern on the IUCN Red List of Threatened Species. It is listed in Appendix II of CITES.
