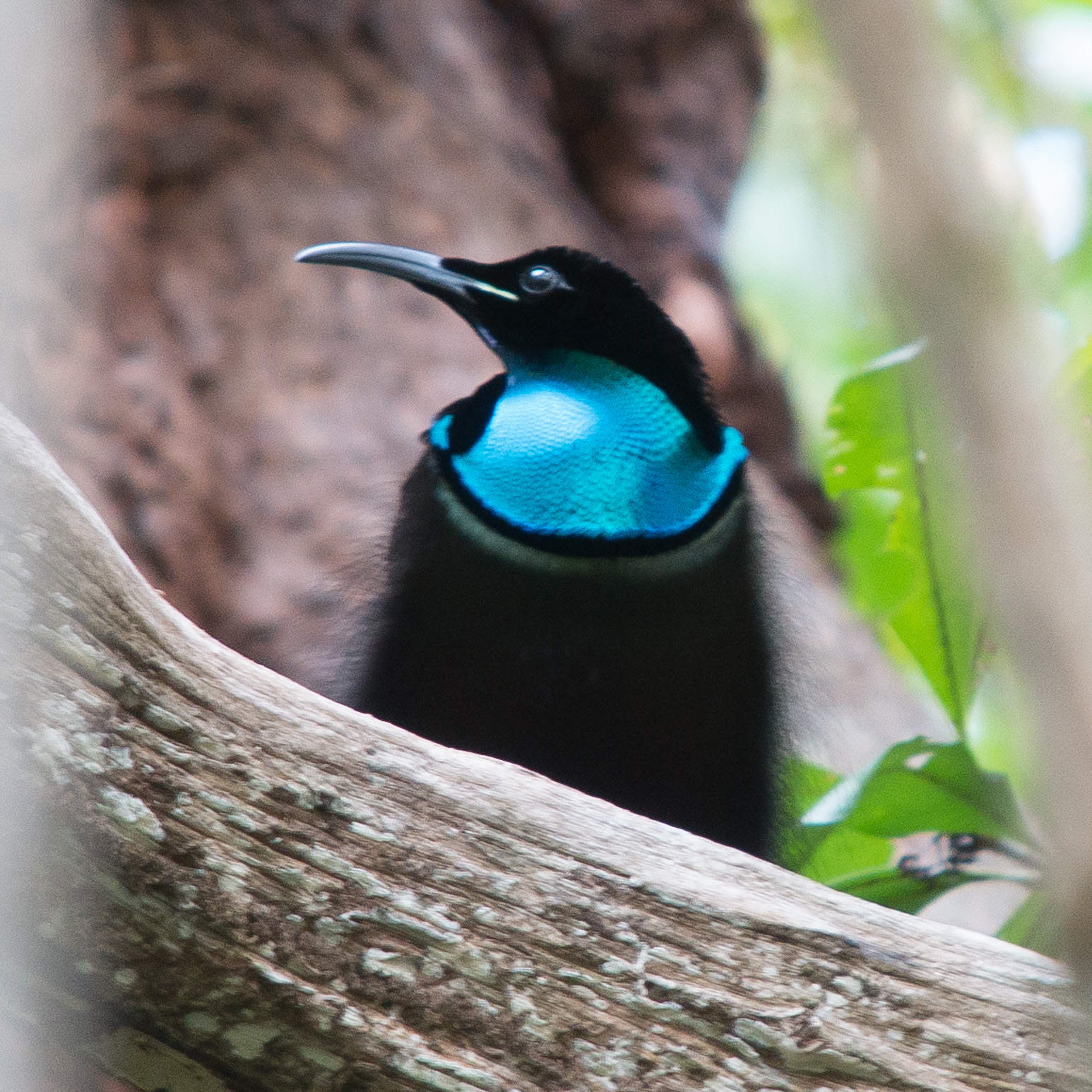
- Male magnificent riflebird perched.

Conservation status
- Least Concern (IUCN 3.1)

Scientific classification
- Kingdom: Animalia
- Phylum: Chordata
- Class: Aves
- Order: Passeriformes
- Family: Paradisaeidae
- Genus: Ptiloris
- Species: P. magnificus

Binomial name
- Ptiloris magnificus (Vieillot, 1819)
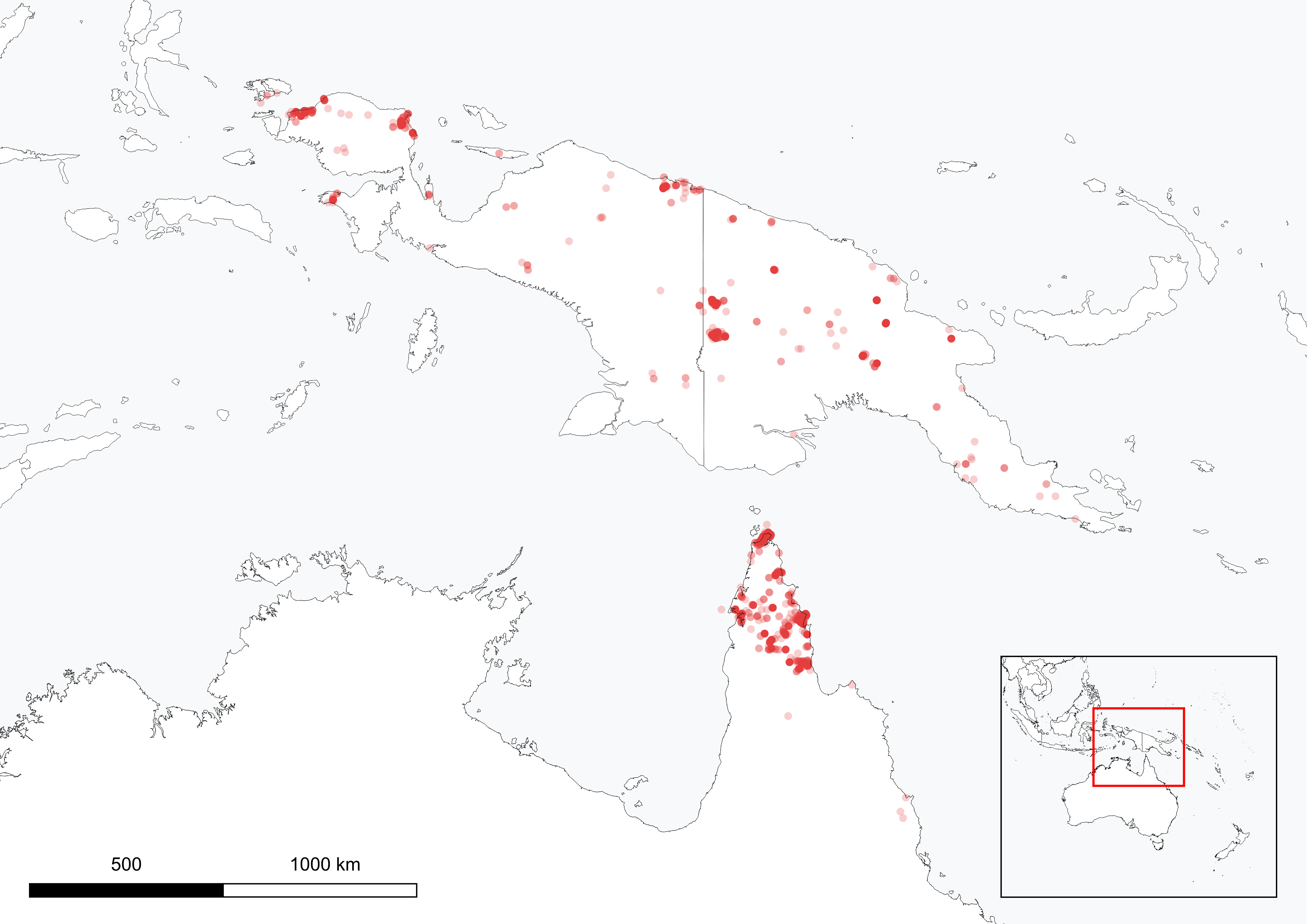
- Species distribution

Synonyms
- Craspedophora magnificus; Falcinellus magnificus; Lophorina magnifica

= Magnificent riflebird =

Species of bird

The magnificent riflebird (Ptiloris magnificus) is a species of passerine bird in the birds-of-paradise family Paradisaeidae.

Magnificent riflebirds are widely distributed throughout lowland rainforests of western New Guinea and the northern Cape York Peninsula of Australia. A relatively common species throughout its range, it is evaluated as a species of Least Concern on the IUCN Red List of Threatened Species. It is listed on Appendix II of CITES.

== Taxonomy ==
The magnificent riflebird was formally described in 1819 by the French ornithologist Louis Vieillot under the binomial name Falcinellus magnificus. It is now placed in the genus Ptiloris that was introduced in 1825 by the English naturalist William Swainson. The common name "riflebird" comes from the likeness of their black velvety plumage to the uniform of the British Army Rifle Brigade.

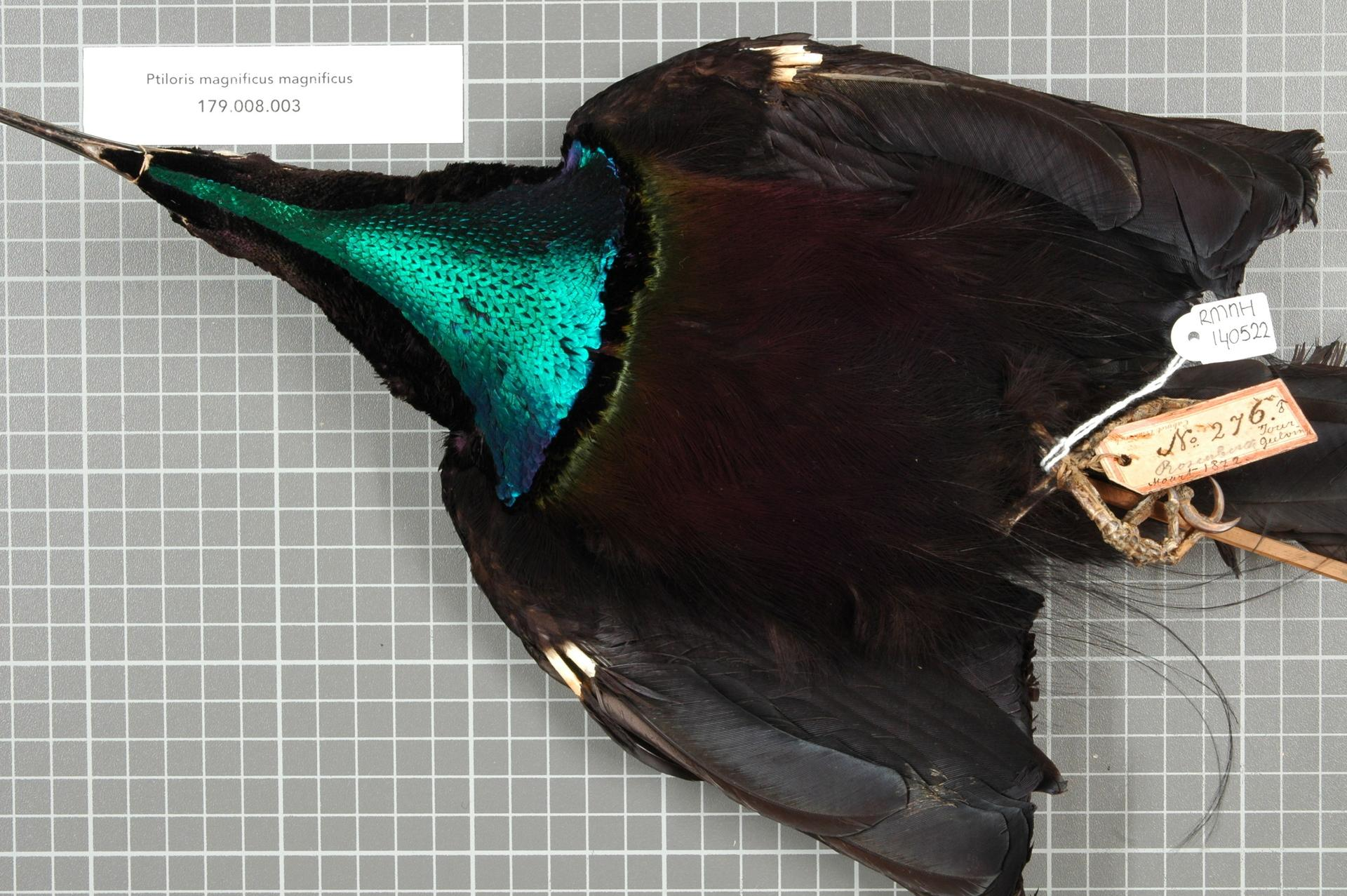
Nominate male specimen at the Naturalis Biodiversity Center. Note its brilliant, scaly, iridescent, delta-shaped breast plate.

Two subspecies are recognised:

- P. m. alberti Elliot, DG, 1871 – north Cape York Peninsula, Australia
- P. m. magnificus (Vieillot, 1819) – west and central New Guinea

== Description ==
This riflebird is a medium-sized bird, being up to 34 cm (13 in) long. The male is velvet-black bird-of-paradise with elongated black filamental flank plumes, an iridescent blue-green crown, a wide, triangle-shaped breast shield, and on central tail feathers. It has a black curved bill, yellow mouth, blackish feet and a dark brown iris. The female is brownish with dark spots and buff bars below with a white brow. The immature male resembles the male but with less tail plumes.

== Behaviour ==
The diet of the magnificent riflebird consists mainly of fruits and a variety of invertebrates such as spiders, millipedes, etc. Males are polygamous and perform solitary courtship displays on a 'dancing perch'. During these displays, the male fully extends his wings and raises his tail; he jerks upward while swinging his head from side to side, showing off his metallic blue-green breast shield, and producing a distinctive "woosh" sound as he flaps his wings. Multiple females will observe these displays, and, if satisfied with the performance, reward the male with mating rights. Females subsequently build nests, incubate, brood, and feed young without male assistance.

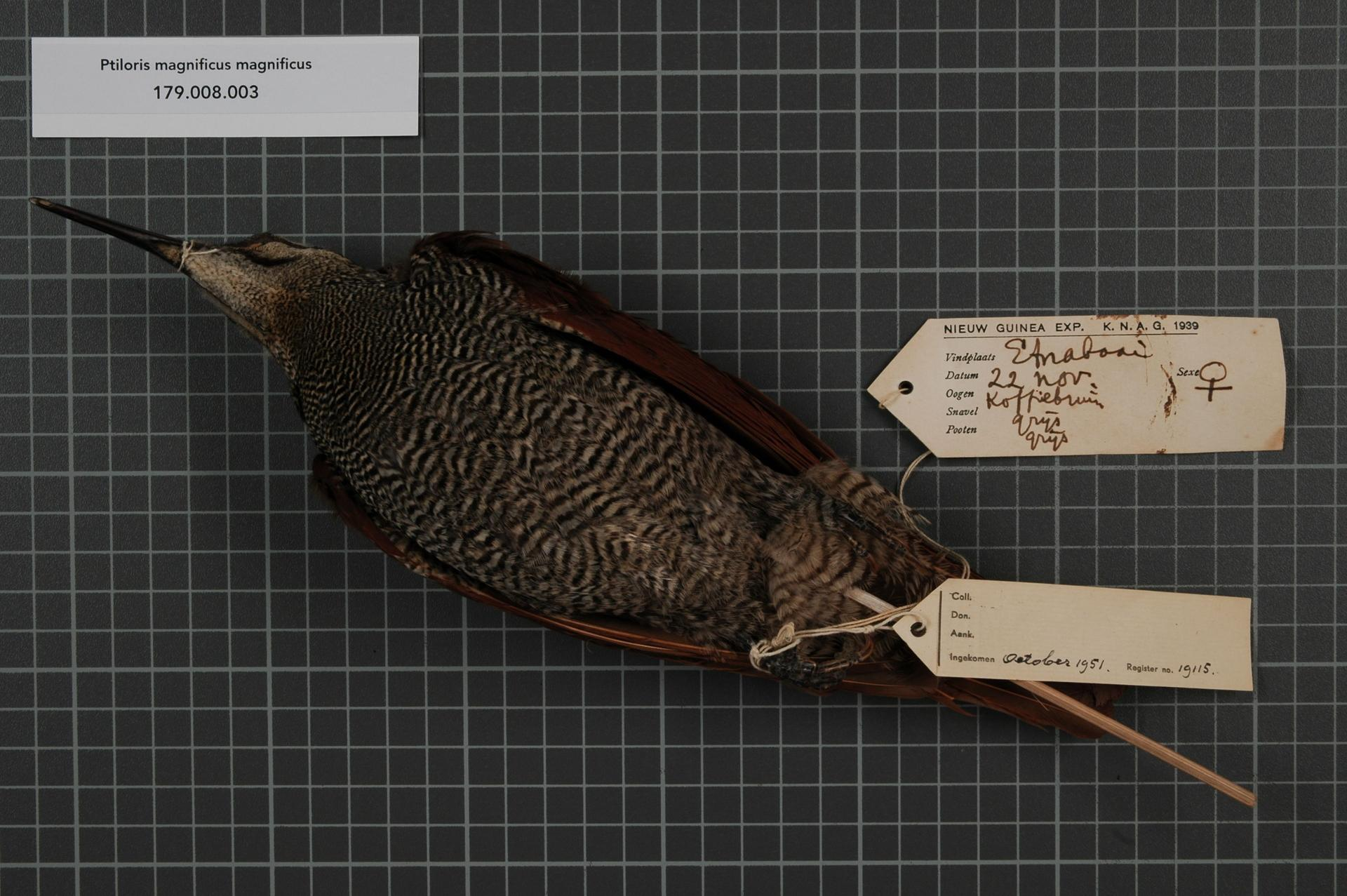
Nominate female at the Naturalis Biodiversity Center. Note the exceptional sexual dimorphism present in the species.
