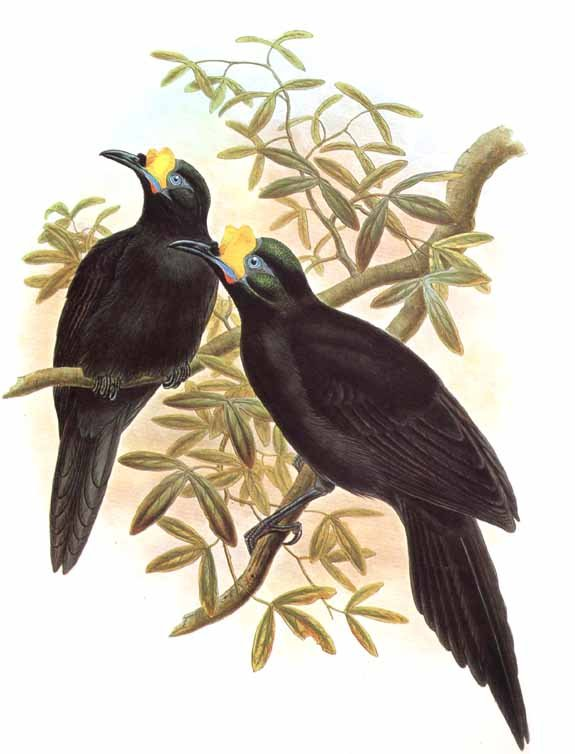

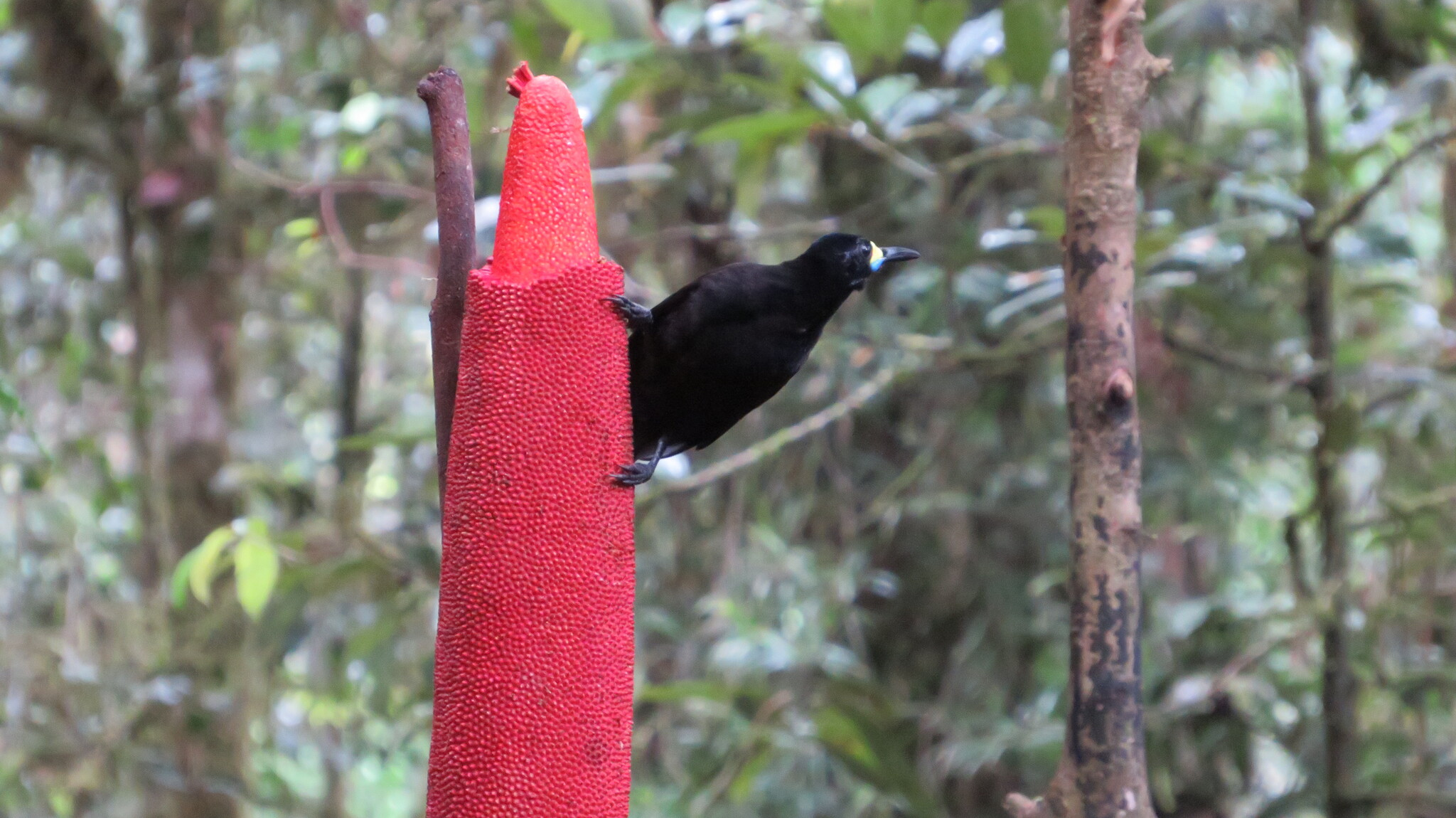

Conservation status
- Near Threatened (IUCN 3.1)

Scientific classification
- Kingdom: Animalia
- Phylum: Chordata
- Class: Aves
- Order: Passeriformes
- Family: Paradisaeidae
- Genus: Paradigalla
- Species: P. carunculata

Binomial name
- Paradigalla carunculata Lesson, 1835

= Long-tailed paradigalla =

Species of bird

The long-tailed paradigalla (Paradigalla carunculata) is a large, approximately 37 cm long, black bird-of-paradise with long and pointed tail. One of the most plain members in the family Paradisaeidae, its only adornment is the colorful facial wattles of yellow, red and sky-blue near base of the bill. Both sexes are similar in appearance, however the female is slightly duller and smaller.

One of the least known members in the family Paradisaeidae, the long-tailed paradigalla is endemic to the Arfak Mountains in Doberai Peninsula, West Papua of Indonesia.

The long-tailed paradigalla is evaluated as Near Threatened on the IUCN Red List of Threatened Species. It is listed on Appendix II of CITES.

== Subspecies ==
- Paradigalla carunculata carunculata
- Paradigalla carunculata intermedia
