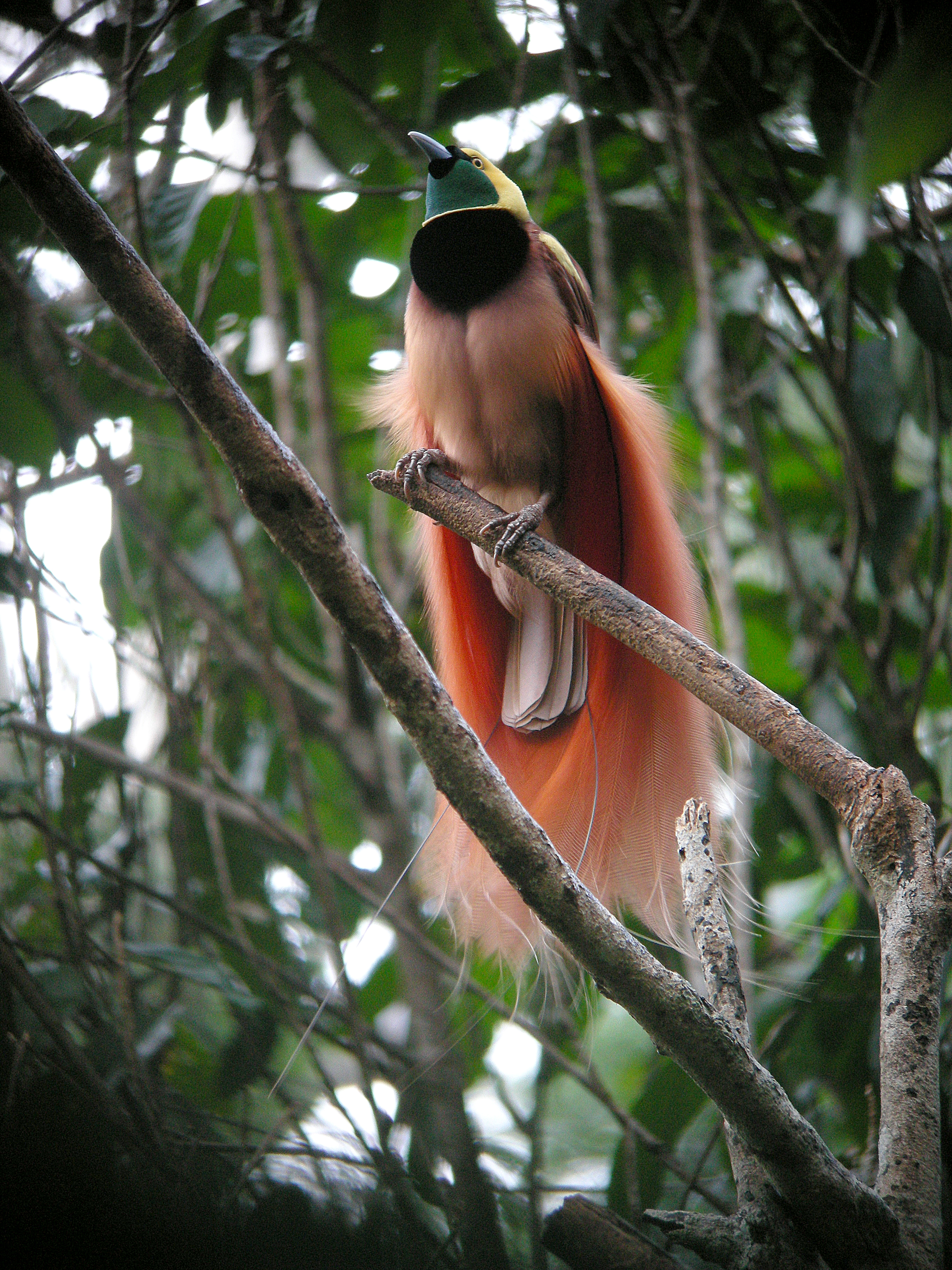
- Raggiana bird-of-paradise (Paradisaea raggiana)

Scientific classification
- Kingdom: Animalia
- Phylum: Chordata
- Class: Aves
- Order: Passeriformes
- Family: Paradisaeidae
- Genus: Paradisaea; Linnaeus, 1758

Type species
- Paradisaea apoda (greater bird-of-paradise) Linnaeus, 1758

Synonyms
- Paradisea Linnaeus, 1758 (Unav.)

= Paradisaea =

Genus of birds

The genus Paradisaea consists of six species of birds-of-paradise (family Paradisaeidae). The genus is found on the island of New Guinea as well as the nearby islands groups of the Aru Islands, D'Entrecasteaux Islands and Raja Ampat Islands. The species inhabit a range of forest types from sea level to mid-montane forests. Several species have highly restricted distributions, and all species have disjunct distributions. A 2009 study examining the mitochondrial DNA of the family found that the Paradisaea birds-of-paradise were in a clade with the genus Cicinnurus. It showed that the blue bird-of-paradise was a sister taxon to all the other species in this genus.

All are large, and sexually dimorphic. The plumage of the males includes characteristic grossly elongated flank plumes (which emerge from beneath the wings and strictly speaking are flank plumes pectoral plumes), and a pair of wire-like feathers emerging from the end of the tail. The flank plumes are used during breeding displays.

The name, Paradisaea, is the Latinized form of "paradise". The local name in Indonesia is cenderawasih.

== Taxonomy ==
The genus Paradisaea was introduced by the Swedish naturalist Carl Linnaeus in 1758 in the tenth edition of his Systema Naturae. (Note: In the 10th edition of his Systema Naturae Linnaeus spelled the genus name as both Paradisea and Paradisaea. In 2012 the International Commission on Zoological Nomenclature suppressed the spelling Paradisea.) The genus name is from Late Latin paradisus meaning "paradise". The type species was designated as the greater bird-of-paradise (Paradisaea apoda) by George Robert Gray in 1840.

=== Species ===
The genus contains six species.

Image	Common name	Scientific name	Distribution
	Greater bird-of-paradise	Paradisaea apoda	Southwestern and southern New Guinea, as well as the Aru Islands; found at altitudes around 900–950 m.
	Raggiana bird-of-paradise	Paradisaea raggiana	Most of South, East-Central, Eastern and Southeastern New Guinea; typically found around at 1500 m in altitude.
	Lesser bird-of-paradise	Paradisaea minor	Most of Northern, Northwestern and Western New Guinea (nominate race found also on Misool and other nearby islands.), also Eastern New Guinea near the Huon region; found at altitudes from 0–1500 m.
	Goldie's bird-of-paradise	Paradisaea decora	Fergusson and Normanby islands in the D’Entrecasteaux Archipelago located Southeast of New Guinea; found at lower altitudes than other Paradisaea members.
	Red bird-of-paradise	Paradisaea rubra	Waigeo and Batanta islands of Raja Ampat in West Papua at altitudes of around 550–600 m.
	Emperor bird-of-paradise	Paradisaea guilielmi	Mountains in the Huon Peninsula in Northeastern New Guinea; commonly found at altitudes of 1300–1500 m, though can be found lower at 400–670 m.
