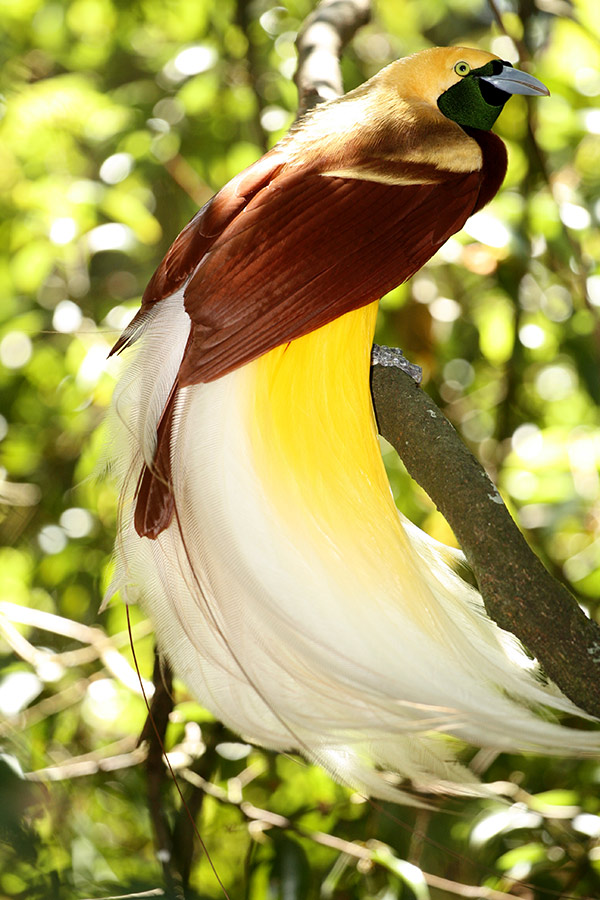
- Male
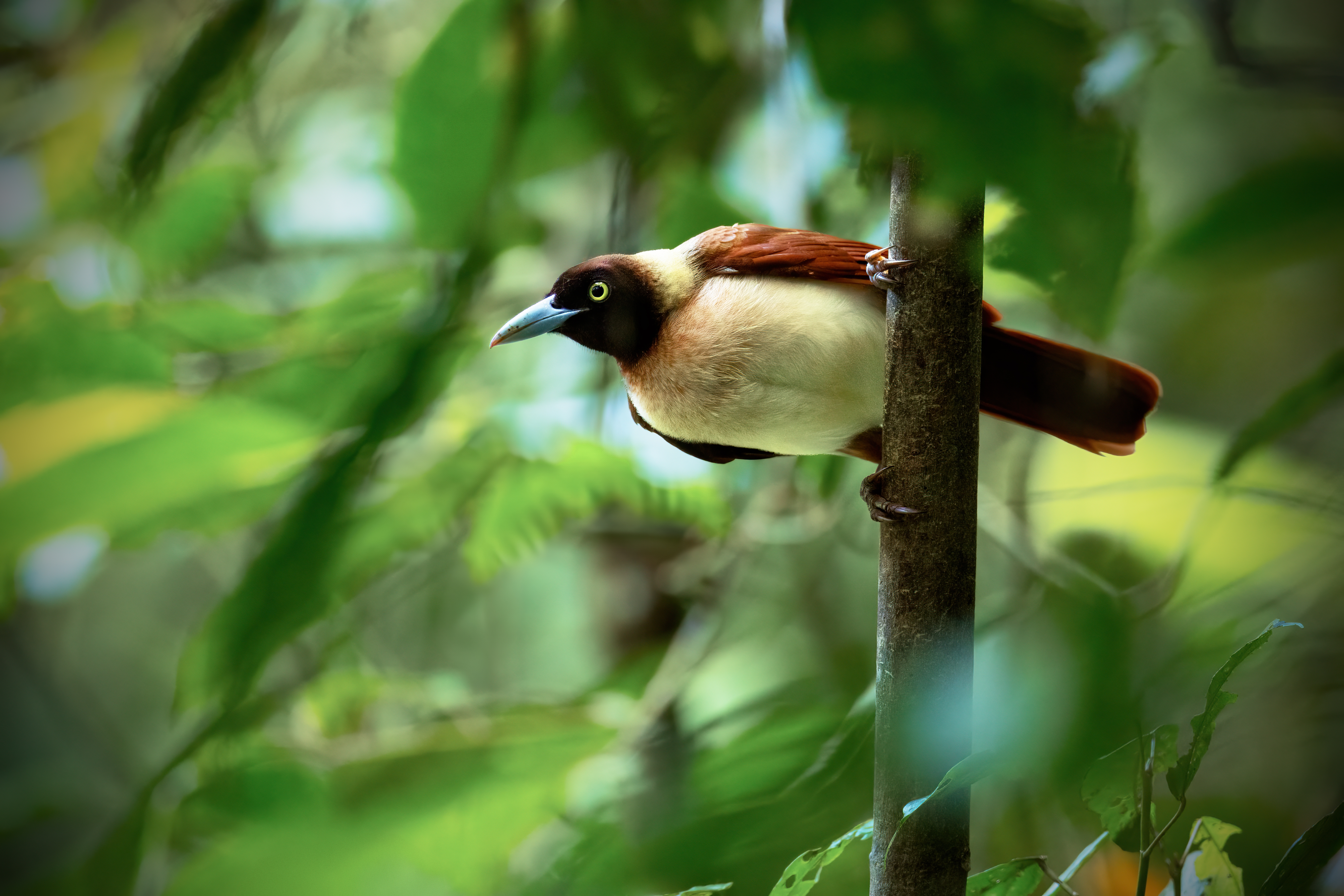
- female

Conservation status
- Least Concern (IUCN 3.1)

Scientific classification
- Kingdom: Animalia
- Phylum: Chordata
- Class: Aves
- Order: Passeriformes
- Family: Paradisaeidae
- Genus: Paradisaea
- Species: P. minor

Binomial name
- Paradisaea minor Shaw, 1809

= Lesser bird-of-paradise =

Species of bird

The lesser bird-of-paradise (Paradisaea minor) is a bird-of-paradise in the genus Paradisaea.

== Description ==
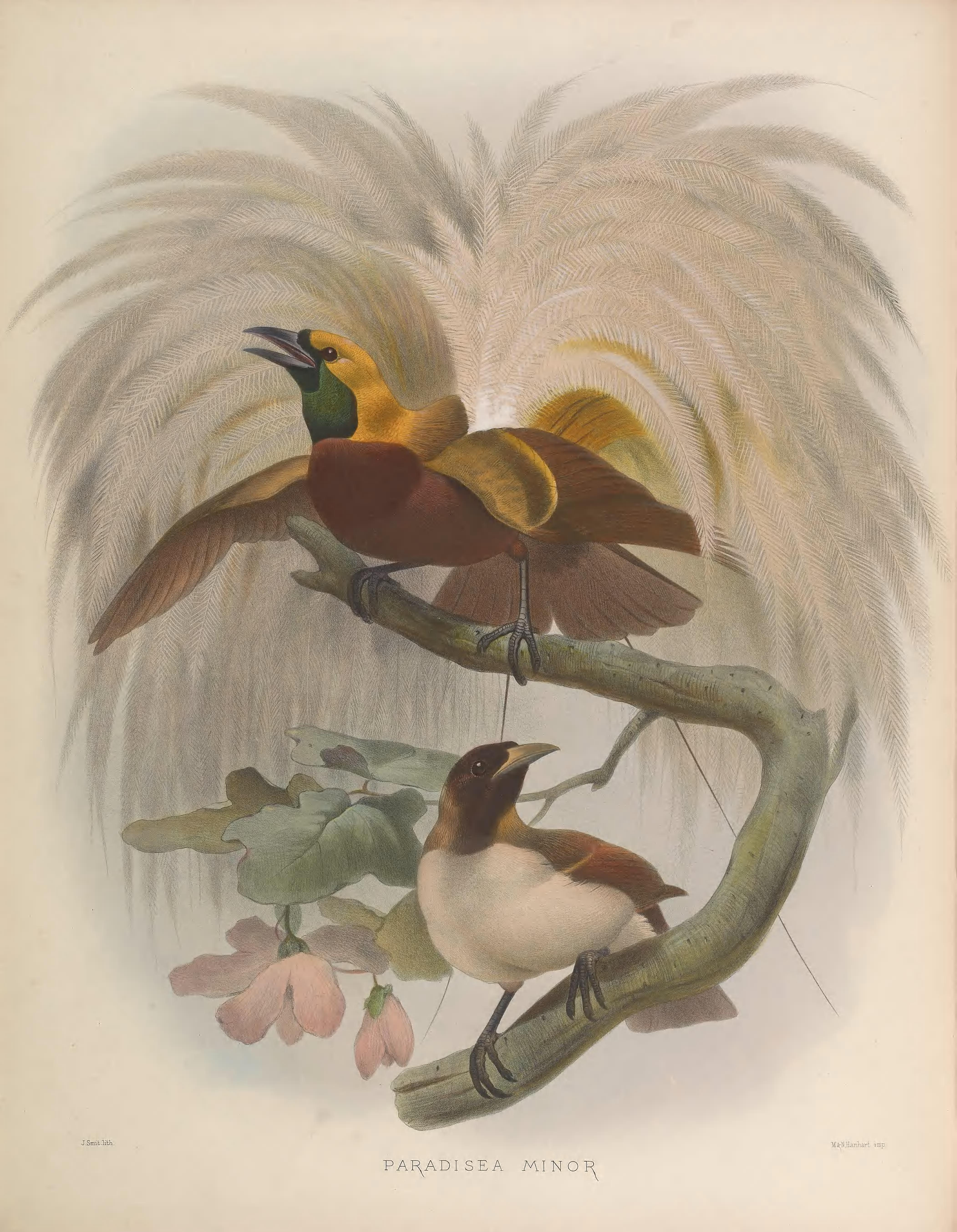
Illustration of male and female.

The lesser bird-of-paradise is medium-sized, up to 32 cm (13 in), maroon-brown with a yellow crown and brownish-yellow upper back. The male has a dark emerald-green throat, a pair of long tail-wires and is adorned with ornamental flank plumes which are deep yellow at their base and fade outwards into white. The female is a maroon bird with a dark-brown head and whitish underparts. Further study is required, but it seems likely that birds-of-paradise also possess toxins in their skins, derived from their insect prey.

It resembles the larger greater bird-of-paradise, but the male of that species has a dark chest, whereas the female is entirely brown (no whitish underparts).

== Breeding ==
The males are polygamous, and perform courtship displays in leks. The female usually lays two pinkish eggs with dark markings in a nest in a tree high above ground. Its diet consists mainly of fruits and insects.

== Distribution ==
The lesser bird-of-paradise is distributed throughout forests of northern New Guinea, and the nearby islands of Misool and Yapen. Widespread and common throughout its large range, the lesser bird-of-paradise is evaluated as Least Concern on the IUCN Red List of Threatened Species. It is listed on Appendix II of CITES.
