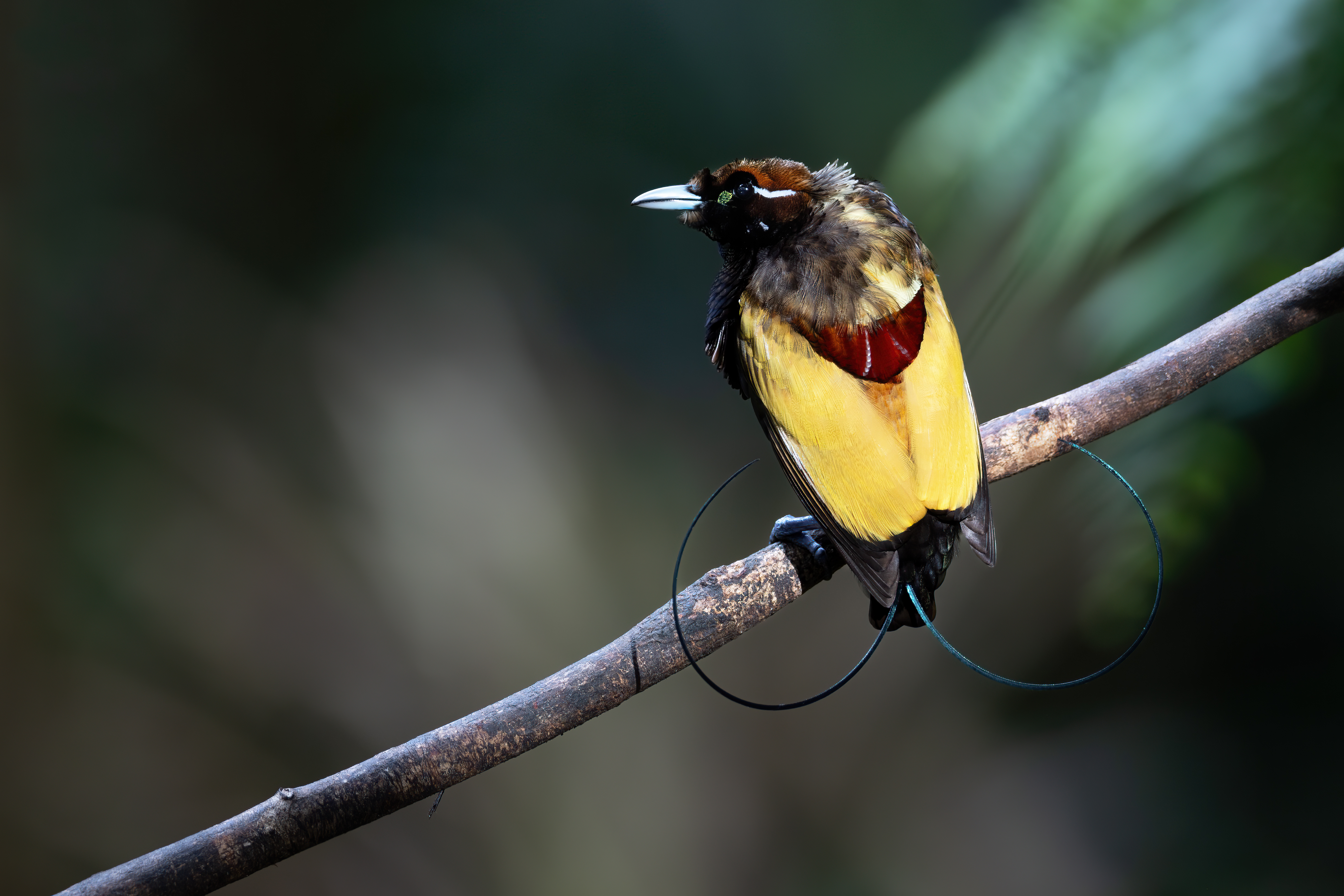
- Male

Conservation status
- Least Concern (IUCN 3.1)

Scientific classification
- Kingdom: Animalia
- Phylum: Chordata
- Class: Aves
- Order: Passeriformes
- Family: Paradisaeidae
- Genus: Diphyllodes
- Species: D. magnificus

Binomial name
- Diphyllodes magnificus (Pennant, 1781)

Synonyms
- Cicinnurus magnificus

= Magnificent bird-of-paradise =

Species of bird

The magnificent bird-of-paradise (Diphyllodes magnificus) is a species of bird-of-paradise. The magnificent bird-of-paradise is evaluated as Least Concern on the IUCN Red List of Threatened Species. They are listed in Appendix II of CITES.

== Etymology ==
The generic name Cicinnurus means "curled tail" and its specific name magnificus means magnificent or splendid. The species was formerly listed in the genus Diphyllodes, which means "Double leaf-like", referring to its "leaf-like" tail.

== Taxonomy ==
The magnificent bird-of-paradise is included in the same genus as the King and Wilson's Birds-of-paradise, though it is more closely related to the latter. The genus Cicinnurus forms a clade with the genera Paradisaea and Paradisornis, and the other closest genus is Astrapia, though it is not included in the clade.

Three subspecies are recognised:

- D. m. magnificus (Pennant, 1781) – Salawati (Raja Ampat Islands, northwest of New Guinea) and south Bird's Head Peninsula (northwest New Guinea)
- D. m. chrysopterus Elliot, DG, 1873 – Yapen (Geelvink Bay islands, northwest New Guinea) and west, central New Guinea
- D. m. hunsteini Meyer, AB, 1886 – east, southeast New Guinea

== Distribution and habitat ==
This rather common species is widespread throughout a large range, in Indonesia, New Guinea and surrounding islands. It occurs in the tropical and subtropical montane and hill forest at altitudes of around 1500 m, though it can be found around 1780 m as well.

== Description ==
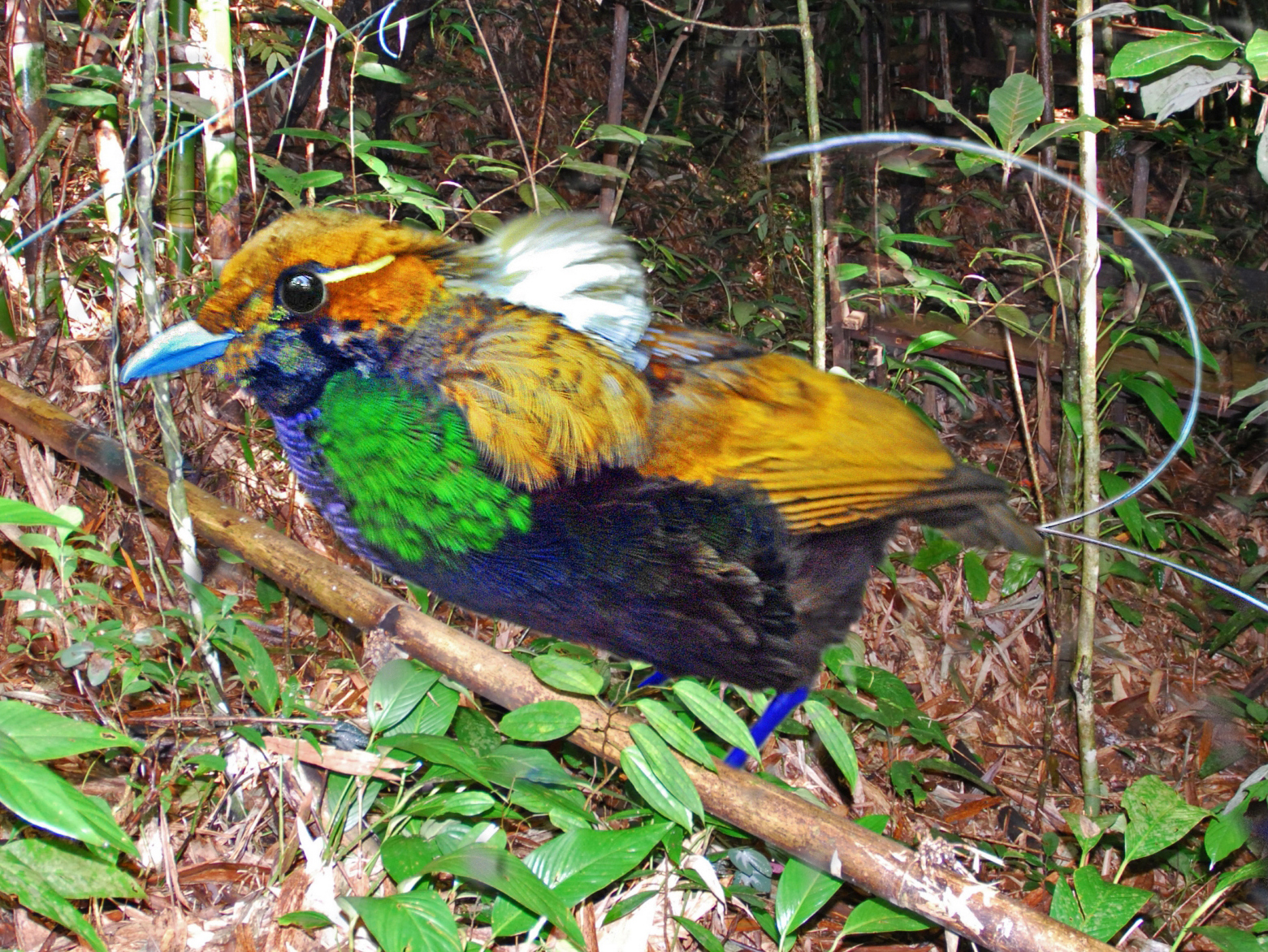
Cicinnurus magnificus from Aru Islands

The magnificent bird-of-paradise has one of the most complex plumage arrangements in the family Paradisaeidae. It reaches around 26–26.5 cm in total length, though the body is around 19 cm. The male has beautiful golden-yellow wings, which are overlapped by a sulfur-colored mantle, or cape, that deflect white to a whitish glow, with deep red feathers bordered by black beneath the cape that form a semicircle over the wings; there are also scruffy brownish feathers on the sides of the cape. The head is fairly short; it is a light brown in a scalloped pattern on the top that extends to the back of the neck, and a darker reddish-brown on the face and below the chin. It has a pale grey-bluish bill, dark brown eyes, and a thin, white line that extends behind the eyes. Below is an entirely different story; almost the entire underside consists of the large, iridescent green breast shield, which is finely decorated with lime-green to turquoise scale-like feathers that run down the middle of it. The plumage under the shield is blackish-brown. When fully extended, the breast shield is edged with shiny turquoise-greenish. The tail is blackish-brown with two long, sickle-like, partially curved central tail plumes that are colored light blue. As characteristic in the genus Cicinnurus, both sexes have colorfully blue legs and feet. The female is drastically different from the extravagant male; she is light-brown above, including the tail (which lacks the long sickles). Her head is light brown, but the chin is intercepted by brown barring and creamy feathers that extend all the way to the rump. Her bill is the same color as the males', and she also has a white line extending behind the eyes.

It is sympatric with its congener, the King Bird-of-paradise, and hybridization has been noted several times. Over 20 specimens of these hybrids exist in museums, though no wild records have ever occurred. It was once even thought to be a separate species, called King of Holland's Bird-of-paradise ("Diphyllodes gulielmitertii"); this hybrid is scarlet red above, of the King, with the golden mantle cape of the Magnificent, also sporting two long tail wires more resembling the king's, but being partially curved at the tip with no green spirals that the king sports.

== Behavior ==
These birds feed mainly on fruits, but also feed on animal matter (notably insects, reptiles, and amphibians), and possibly take nectar and flowers. They mainly feed solitarily, but may also feed in mixed-species congregations. Like most members of the family Paradisaeidae, the male is polygamous and performs an elaborate courtship display, unique in its family. These birds build their courts on rugged slopes of rocky and uneven terrain. Their courtship typically takes place on a sapling standing up from the ground. He commonly tends to his court and makes sure it stays clean and clear of fallen debris.

When a female attends his court, he is usually on his display perch. Here is where he does his display; he leans backwards to the point where his body is perpendicular to the sapling, raises his mantle cape, to where it appears like a yellow halo behind his head, expands and flexes his iridescent breast shield, and waggles his sickle-shaped tail on each side. Though this performance is comical, it is often observed by many females nearby, who do not take the male mating with the core audience member too lightly. When the male is about to copulate with the core female, other females nearby will spring from their perches to attack and shoo off the female, and the male is discouraged and may have to wait a while to perform again.

Typical of most of the bird-of-paradise family, the female takes up all parental duties, including nest-building, incubation, and chick-rearing. They lay one to two creamy yellow eggs, and incubation usually concludes within 19 days, and the chicks usually fledge in 18 days.

== Gallery ==
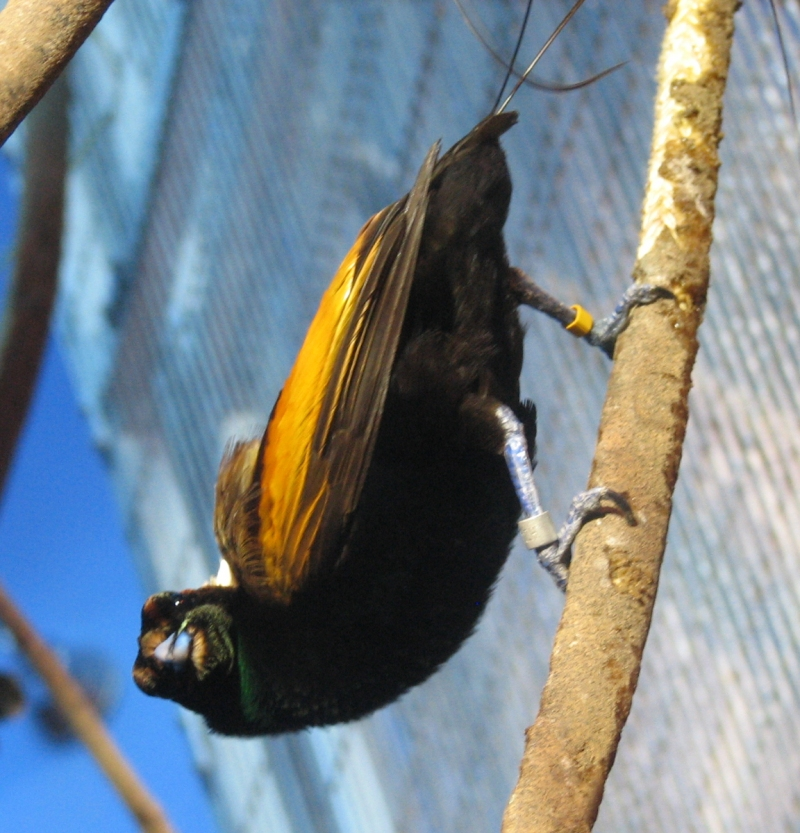
Male

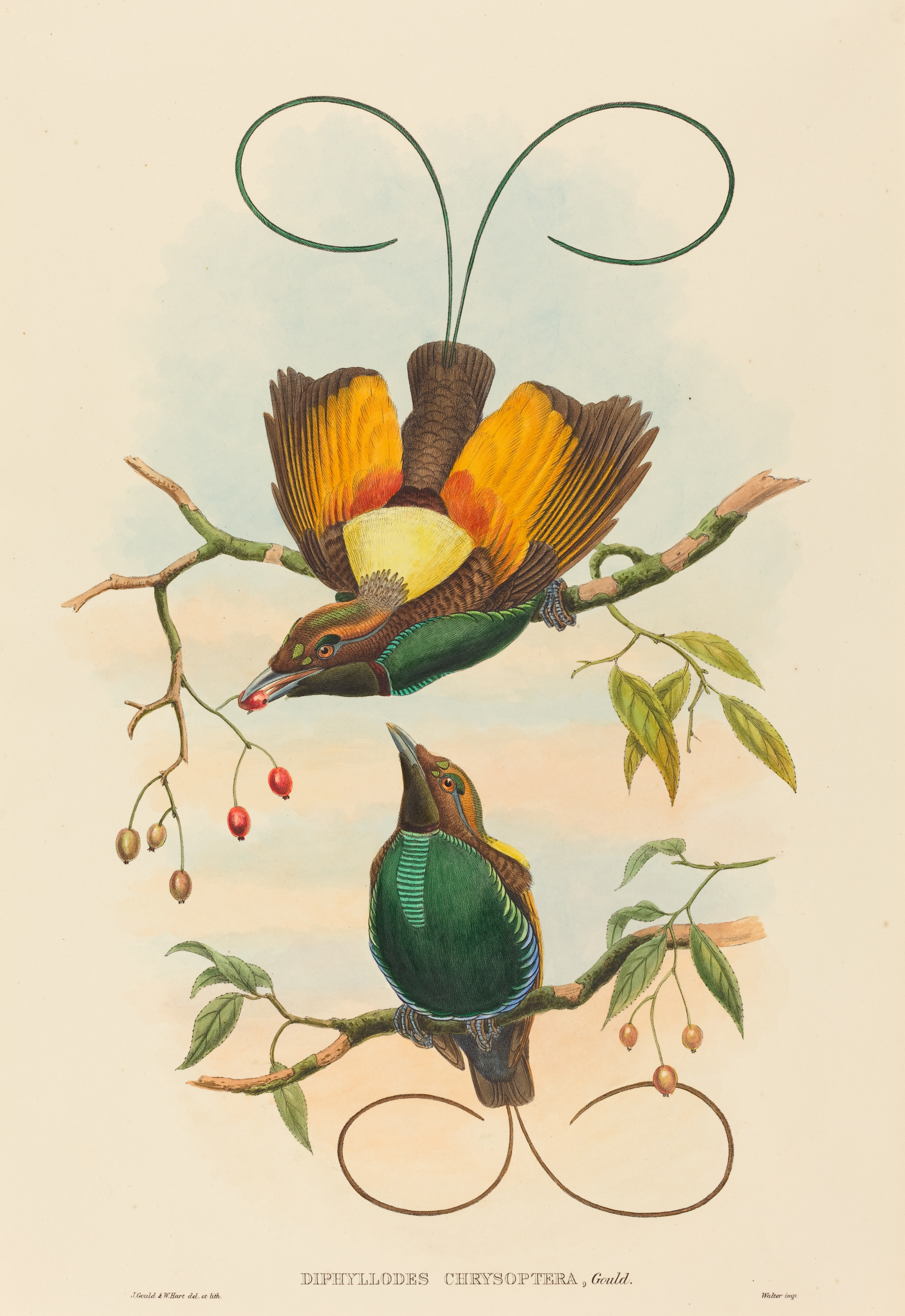
Two males (Illustration by John Gould).

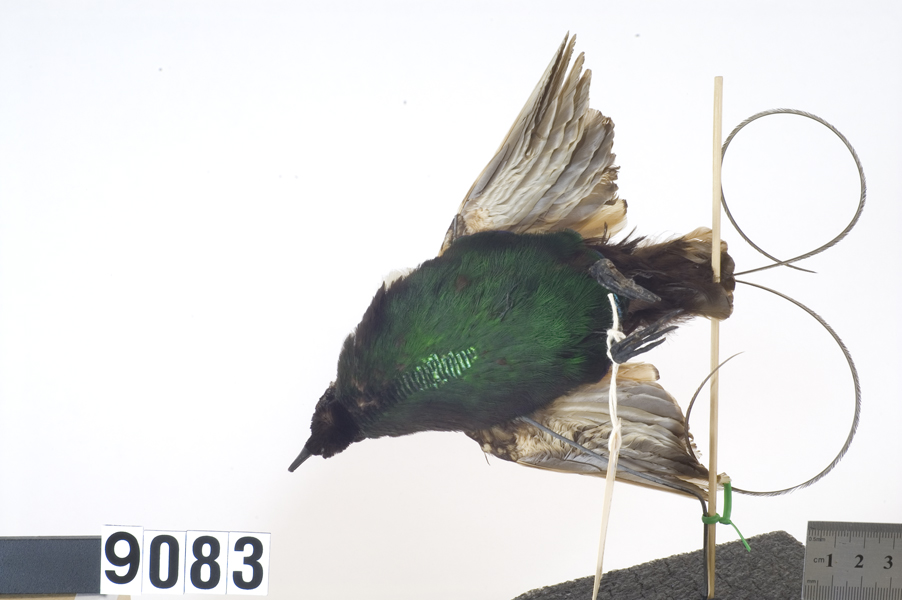
Male underside, showing the iridescent green breast shield.

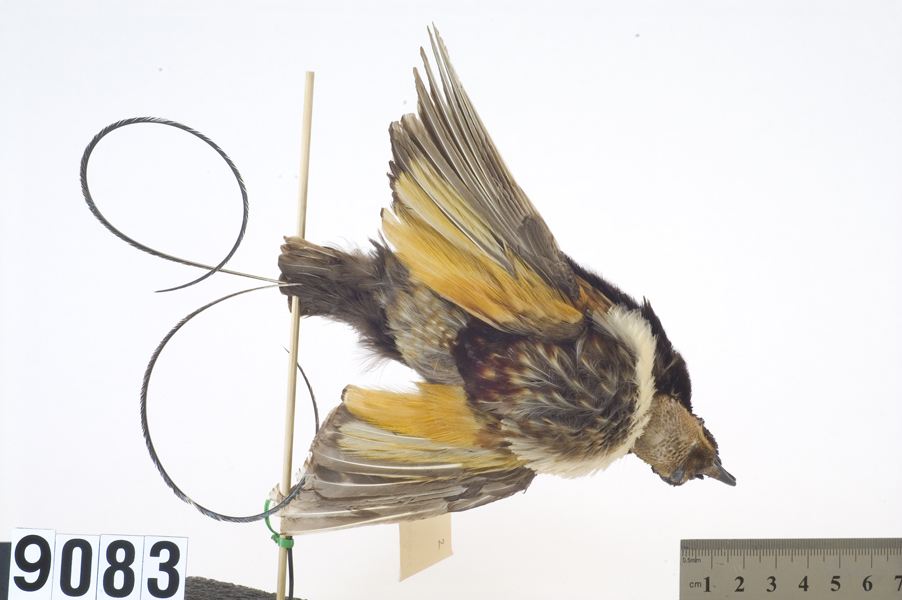
Male upperside.

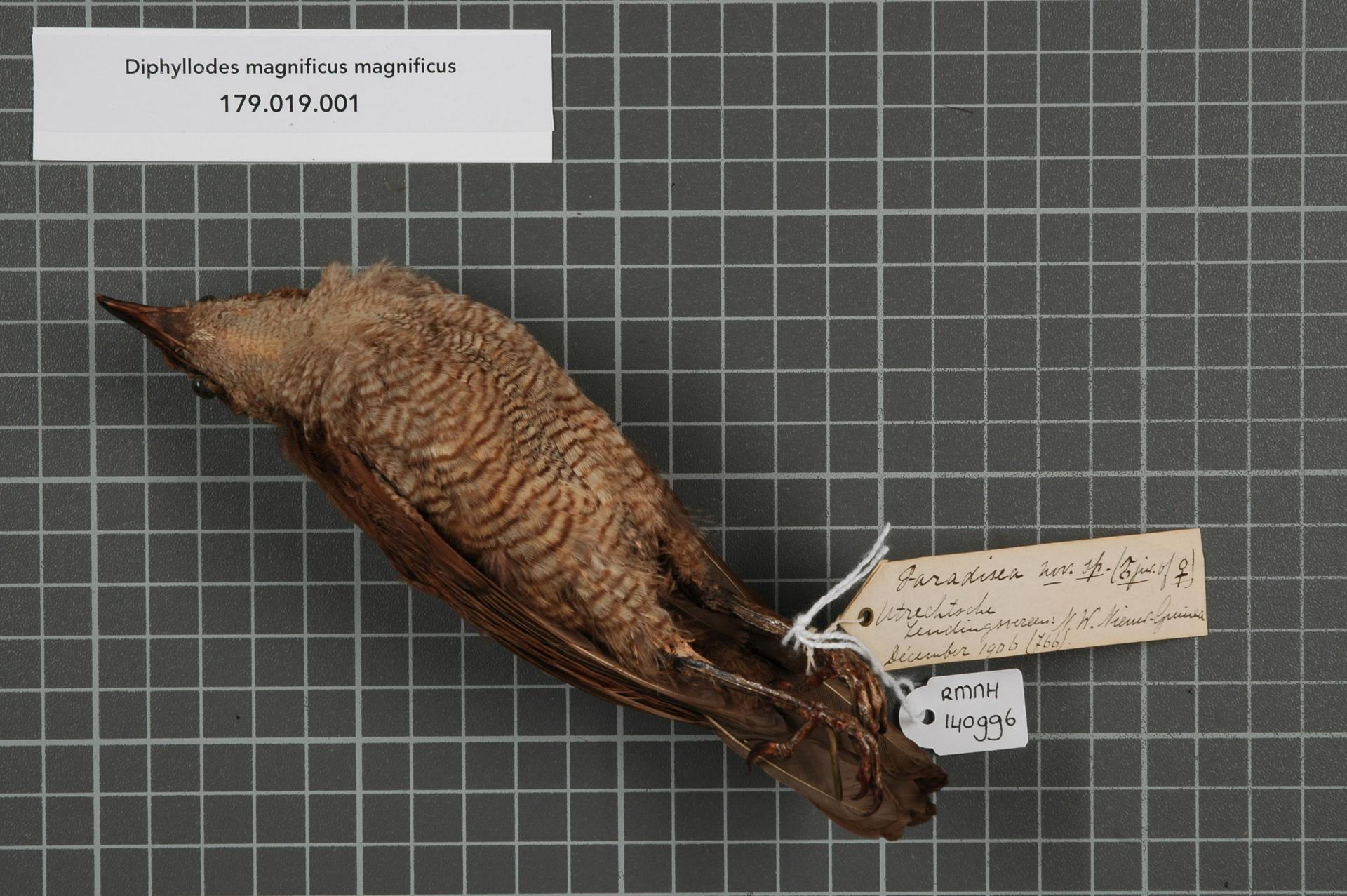
Nominate female specimen at the Naturalis Biodiversity Center.

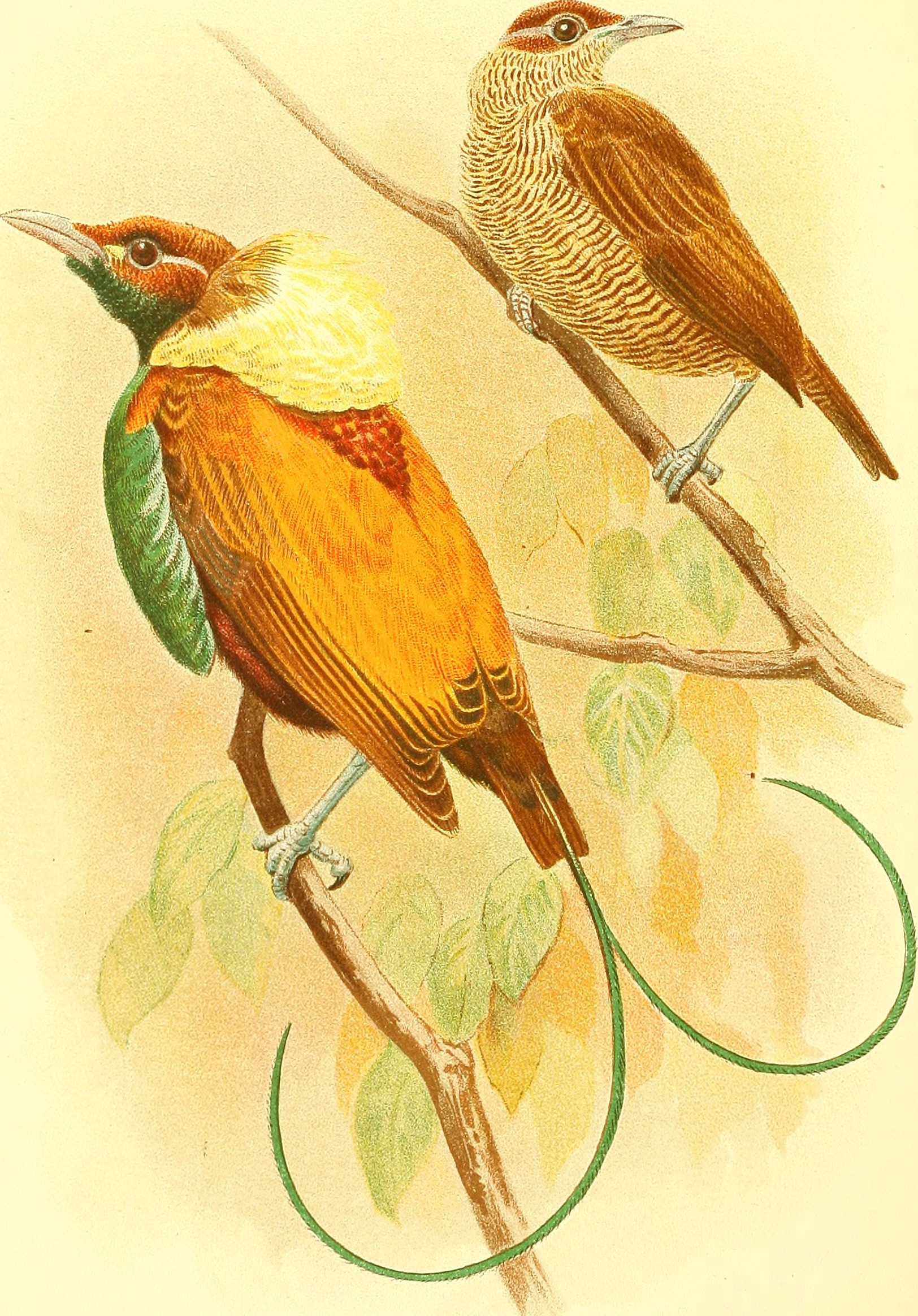
Male (left) and female (right)

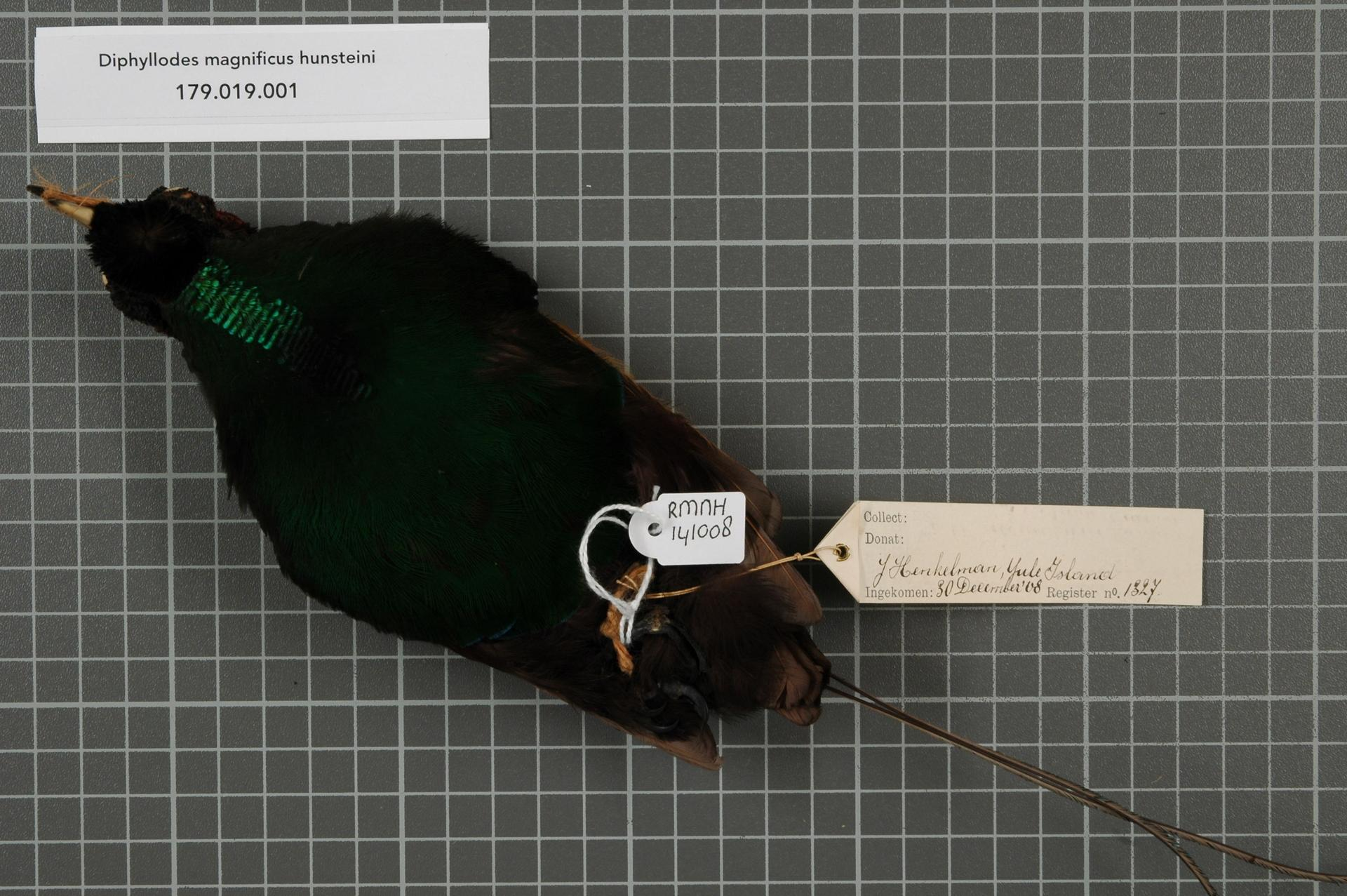
Male specimen, race hunsteini, at the Naturalis Biodiversity Center. Note the iridescent scale-like feathers going down the breast shield.

== Bibliography ==
- Beehler, B. M. (1983). Frugivory and polygamy in Birds of Paradise. The Auk 100: 1-12.
- Bruce M. Beehler, Thane K. Pratt: Birds of New Guinea. Distribution, Taxonomy, and Systematics. Princeton University Press, Princeton 2016, ISBN 978-0-691-16424-3.
- Clifford B. Frith, Bruce M. Beehler: The Birds of Paradise – Paradisaeidae. Oxford University Press, Oxford 1998, ISBN 0-19-854853-2.
- Eugene M McCarthy: Handbook of Avian Hybrids of the World. Oxford University Press, Oxford 2006, ISBN 0-19-518323-1.
- Frith, C. B. & Frith, D. W. (2009). Family Paradisaeidae (Birds of Paradise). In del Hoyo, J. Elliott, A. & Christie, D. Handbook of the Birds of the World. Bush-shrikes to Old World Sparrows. Volume 14. p. 404-459. Lynx Edicions, Barcelona.
- Gilliard, E. T. (1969). Birds of paradise and Bowerbirds. Weidenfeld & Nicolson, New York.
- Ottaviani, M. (2012). Les Oiseaux de Paradis – Histoire Naturelle et photographies, 320 pages. Éditions Prin, France.
- Thane Pratt & Bruce M Behhler. (2015): Birds of New Guinea. Princeton University Press, Princeton & Oxford, 2. Ausgabe, ISBN 978-0-691-09563-9.
