= Jungle flycatcher =

Animal set index article

Jungle flycatcher may refer to:

- all species in the genus Vauriella
- seven species in the genus Cyornis
