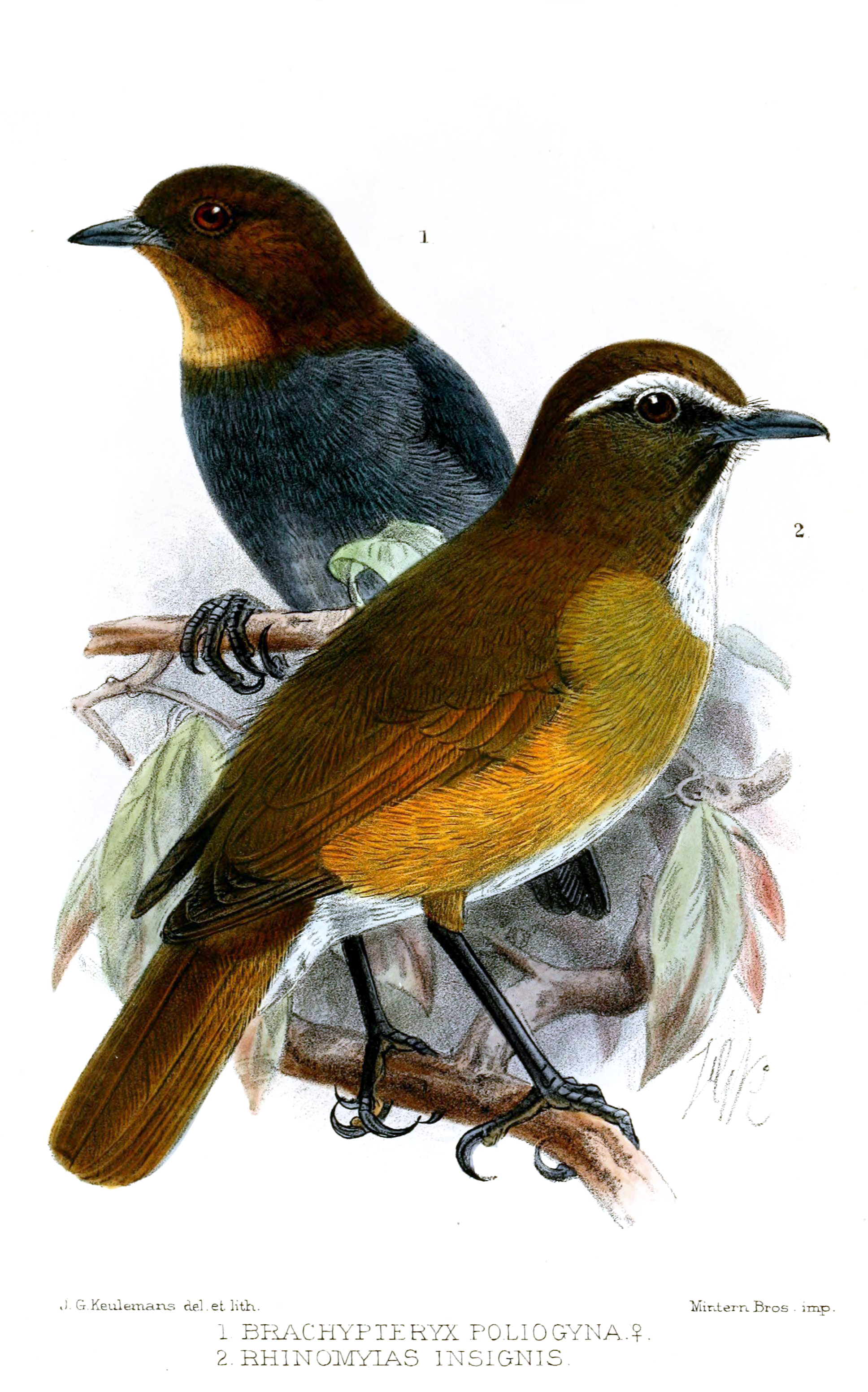

Conservation status
- Least Concern (IUCN 3.1)

Scientific classification
- Kingdom: Animalia
- Phylum: Chordata
- Class: Aves
- Order: Passeriformes
- Family: Muscicapidae
- Genus: Vauriella
- Species: V. insignis

Binomial name
- Vauriella insignis (Ogilvie-Grant, 1895)

Synonyms
- Rhinomyias insignis

= White-browed jungle flycatcher =

Species of bird

The white-browed jungle flycatcher (Vauriella insignis), also known as the Luzon jungle-flycatcher and the rusty-flanked jungle-flycatcher, is a species of bird in the Old World flycatcher family Muscicapidae. It is endemic to Luzon island, in the Philippines. The natural habitat of the white-browed jungle flycatcher is tropical moist montane forests of the Cordillera Mountain Range and possibly Sierra Madre Mountains. It is threatened by habitat loss.

== Description and taxonomy ==
Along with the West Visayas' white-throated jungle flycatcher, Mindanao's slaty-backed jungle flycatcher and Borneo's eyebrowed jungle flycatcher, this species was previously placed in the genus Rhinomyias but was moved to Vauriella when a molecular phylogenetic study published in 2010 found that Rhinomyias was polyphyletic. This study also revealed that this species is not a flycatcher but a forest robin. A proposed name for the species group is "shade-dweller"

== Ecology and behavior ==
Not much information of its diet in the wild but includes small invertebrates. Forages silently close to the forest floor, typically along forest edge.

No information at all about its breeding habits.

== Habitat and conservation status ==
It is found in tropical moist primary montane Forest above 950 meters above sea level. It is often found in the understory. All confirmed records are in the Cordillera Mountain Range but there are also three sight records in the Sierra Madre.

IUCN Red List previously assessed this bird as vulnerable with the population being estimated at 2,500 to 9,999 mature individuals but in 2024 was downlisted to a Least-concern species. This downlisting does not mean that this species is increasing but rather reflects new data that this species occurs in higher densities than originally believed. This report states that the rate of loss of montane habitat has declined. This species' main threat is habitat loss due to deforestation through mining, logging and conversion of habitat into farmland. Mossy forests of the Cordillera Central are threatened by conversion to agricultural land, primarily for vegetable production. Forest cover in the Sierra Madre has declined by 83% since the 1930s.

It occurs in a few protected areas like Mount Pulag National Park. There are two supposed records Northern Sierra Madre Natural Park but its presence in the Sierra Madres is yet to be definitively confirmed. However, most protected areas in the Philippines lack protection and enforcement from habitat conversion and logging.

Conservation actions proposed include to conduct surveys using mist-nets to determine its current distribution and status. Extend the Northern Sierra Madre Natural Park to incorporate Mt Los Dos Cuernos. Propose further known key sites (i.e. Mount Polis) for establishment as formal protected areas. Control habitat degradation in Mount Pulag National Park.
