= Walter Goodfellow =

British zoological collector

Walter Goodfellow (1866–1953) was a British zoological collector and ornithologist.

== Career ==
Goodfellow began his career as a wildlife collector by collecting specimens for museums, but later concentrated on capturing live birds for private aviaries. He took great care of his caged birds, often releasing those which appeared distressed, and refused to participate in the extensive trade in dead birds for women's fashions. Over forty years of collecting expeditions he travelled through Central and South America, Taiwan, the Philippines, New Guinea and Melville Island, off northern Australia.

=== Mikado pheasant ===
Goodfellow's best-known ornithological achievement was the scientific discovery of the Mikado pheasant in the central mountain ranges of Taiwan and its introduction to aviculture. In about 1906 he secured the type specimen, comprising two long black tail feathers obtained from one of his porters who was wearing them in a head-dress. On a later visit to Taiwan he obtained eleven live birds, eight males and three females, which were taken to Britain and bred successfully in captivity.

== Recognition ==
Birds and other animals named for Goodfellow include the Apo myna (Goodfellowia miranda), Taiwan firecrest (Regulus goodfellowi), the Taiwan shortwing (Brachypteryx goodfellowi), slaty-backed jungle-flycatcher (Rhinomyias goodfellowi), black-masked white-eye (Lophozosterops goodfellowi), Goodfellow's tuco-tuco (Ctenomys goodfellowi), and Goodfellow's tree-kangaroo (Dendrolagus goodfellowi). The lyre-tailed king bird of paradise was described by Ogilvie-Grant in 1907 with the binomen of Cicinnurus goodfellowi, though it has subsequently been found to be a hybrid.
