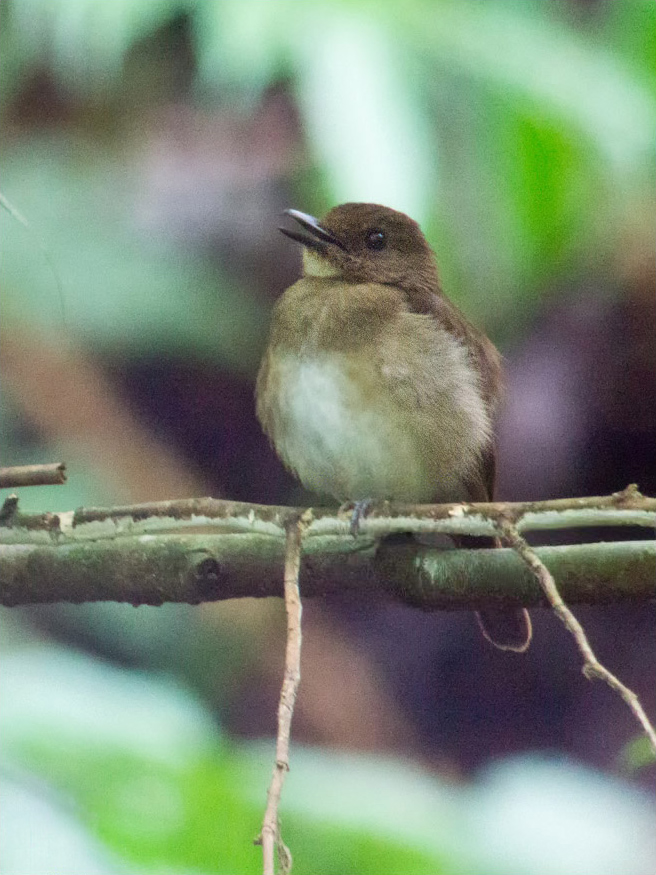

Conservation status
- Vulnerable (IUCN 3.1)

Scientific classification
- Kingdom: Animalia
- Phylum: Chordata
- Class: Aves
- Order: Passeriformes
- Family: Muscicapidae
- Genus: Vauriella
- Species: V. albigularis

Binomial name
- Vauriella albigularis (Bourns & Worcester, 1894)

Synonyms
- Rhinomyias albigularis

= White-throated jungle flycatcher =

Species of bird

The white-throated jungle flycatcher (Vauriella albigularis), also known as the Negros jungle flycatcher, is a species of bird in the Old World flycatcher family Muscicapidae. It is endemic to the Philippines (Negros and Panay islands) and formerly on Guimaras before its extirpation there. The natural habitats of the white-throated jungle flycatcher are tropical moist lowland forests and tropical moist montane forests at altitudes of up to 1,350 meters. It is threatened by habitat loss.

== Description and taxonomy ==
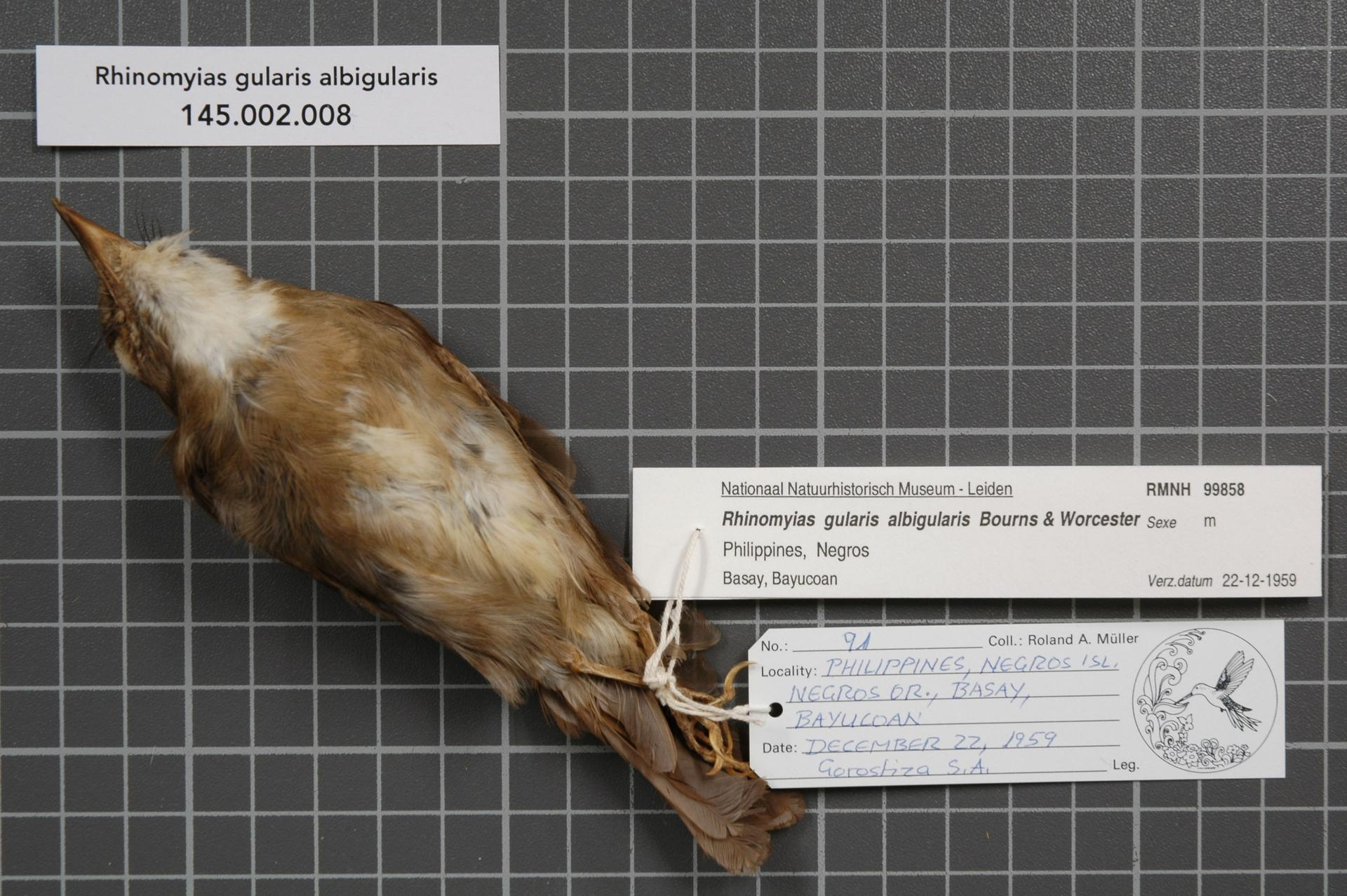
A skin from the Naturalis Biodiversity Center

This species is described as a drab bird found in the forests of Negros and Panay. Relative to other flycatchers, it is quite large at sizes of 16-17cm. It is primarily dark brown with a white throat and belly.

Its call is described as a series of descending metallic notes that rises in the end.

This species was previously placed in the genus Rhinomyias but was moved to Vauriella along with the White-browed jungle flycatcher of Luzon, the Slaty-backed jungle flycatcher of Mindanao and the Eyebrowed jungle flycatcher of Borneo after a detailed molecular phylogenetic study published in 2010 found that Rhinomyias was polyphyletic.

== Ecology and behavior ==
Not much information of its diet in the wild but includes small invertebrates. Forages silently close to the forest floor, typically along forest edge.

Breeding season is not fully known but nest seen in March and a fledgling has been seen in April. Nest is cup shaped and made of moss, fibers and roots. Nests in tree cavities and even on the sides of limestone streams.

== Habitat and conservation status ==
It is found in tropical moist lowland forests and the lower reaches of tropical moist montane forests typically below 1,000 meters above sea level, but has been recorded at up to 1,350 meters. It prefers primary forest but it has also been recorded in secondary forest and forest edge. It forages in the understorey and lower canopy usually below 10 meters above the ground.

The IUCN Red List assessed this bird as a Vulnerable species with population estimated as 2,000 to 8,000 mature individuals. It is mainly threatened by habitat loss. Negros is one of the most deforested islands in the country, owing to illegal logging and conversion of forests into sugarcane plantations. An estimated 4% of Negros and 8% of Panay remained forested in 1988, most of it above 1,000 m.

Conservation actions proposed include

- more surveys, especially on Panay, in order to fully understand the range and population of this bird
- stronger protection of remaining forest areas including securing funding to increase the number of forest rangers, as well as strengthening enforcement measures to prevent illegal logging.
