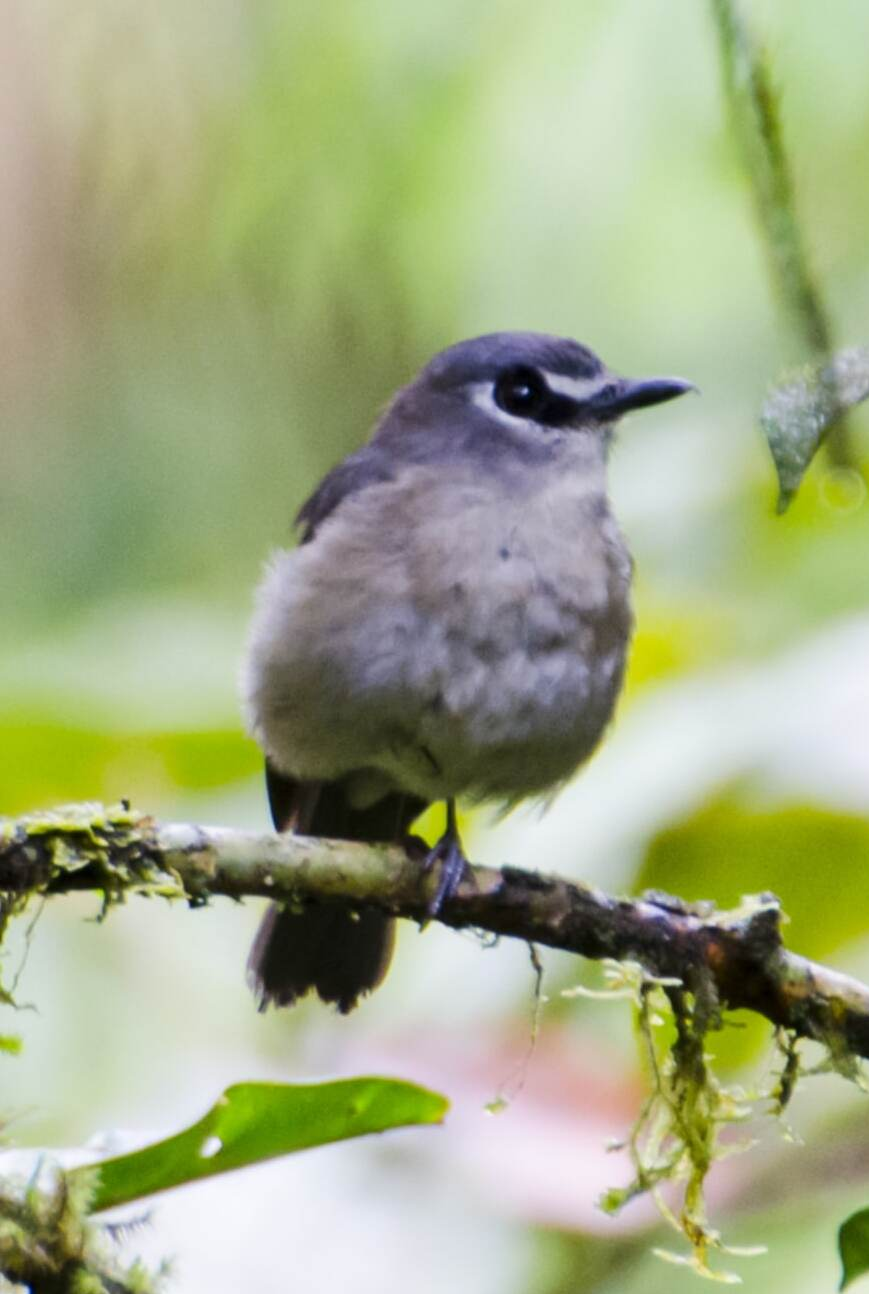

Conservation status
- Near Threatened (IUCN 3.1)

Scientific classification
- Kingdom: Animalia
- Phylum: Chordata
- Class: Aves
- Order: Passeriformes
- Family: Muscicapidae
- Genus: Vauriella
- Species: V. goodfellowi

Binomial name
- Vauriella goodfellowi (Ogilvie-Grant, 1905)

Synonyms
- Rhinomyias goodfellowi

= Slaty-backed jungle flycatcher =

Species of bird

The slaty-backed jungle flycatcher (Vauriella goodfellowi), also known as the Goodfellow's jungle flycatcher or the Mindanao jungle flycatcher, is a species of bird in the Old World flycatcher family Muscicapidae. It is endemic to the Philippines found only on the island of Mindanao. The specific epithet honours the British zoological collector Walter Goodfellow. Its natural habitat is tropical moist montane forests. It is threatened by habitat loss

== Description and taxonomy ==
This species is described as a medium sized bird found in the montane forests of Midnanao. Relative to other flycatchers, it is quite large at sizes of 17-18cm. It is primarily pale gray brown with a lighter belly and throat. It has white spectacles and forehead with a dark eyering and lores. It has pink legs and a black bill with a hooked bill tip.

Its call is described as a series of rapid, high pitched and repeated notes that initially accelerate and decelerates t the end.

This species was previously placed in the genus Rhinomyias but was moved to Vauriella along with the White-browed jungle flycatcher of Luzon, the White-throated jungle flycatcher of West Visayas and the Eyebrowed jungle flycatcher of Borneo after a detailed molecular phylogenetic study published in 2010 found that Rhinomyias was polyphyletic.

== Ecology and behavior ==
Not much information of its diet in the wild but includes small invertebrates. Forages silently close to the forest floor, typically along forest edge.

Birds in breeding condition and fledged young seen from February to October. No published comprehensive information at all about its breeding habits but this species is currently being studied by the Robert S. Kennedy Bird Conservancy and nests have been recorded in July.

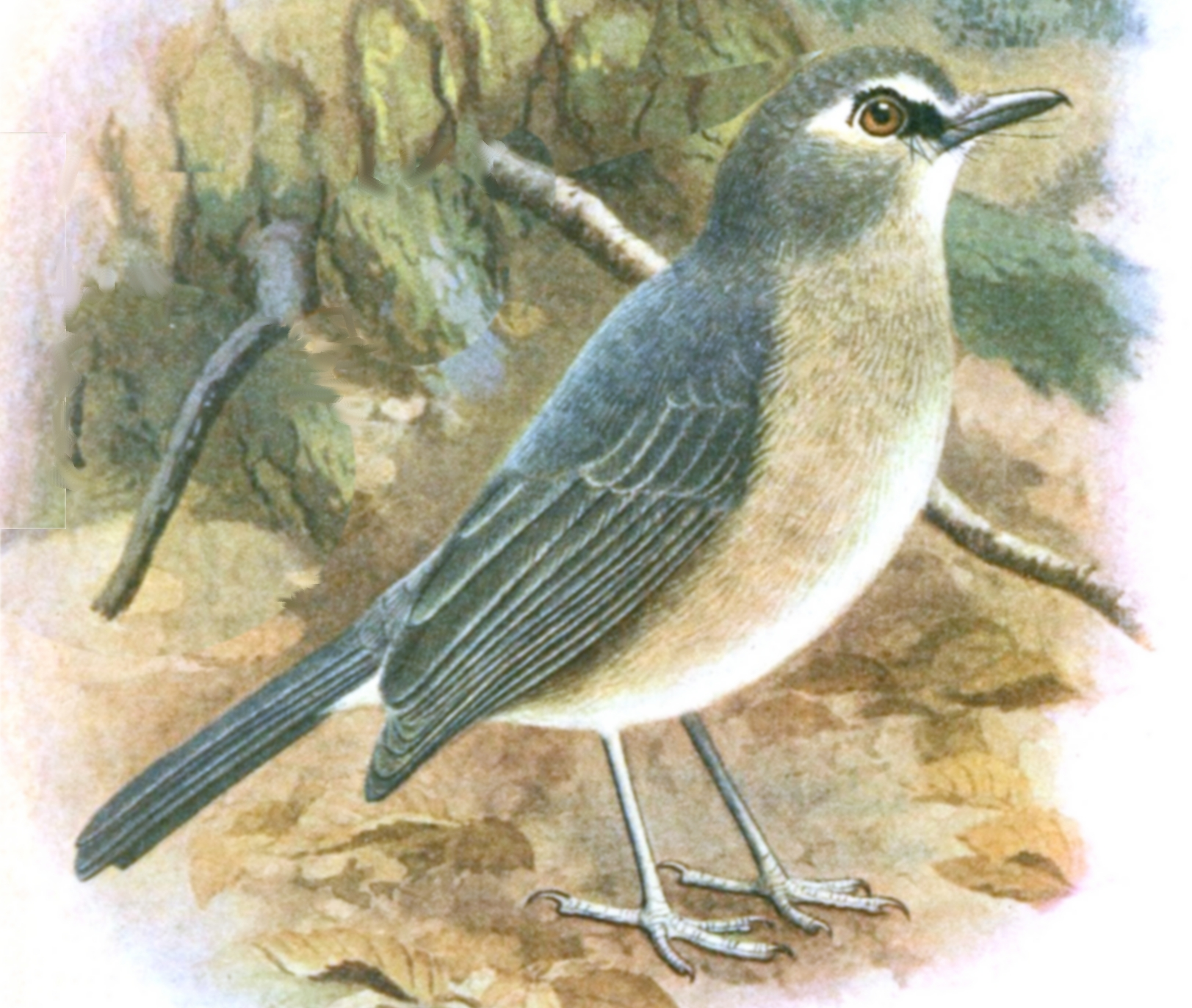
An illustration by Gould, 1906

== Habitat and conservation status ==
It occupies montane mossy forest above 1,000 meters above sea level where they are seen usually solitary o in pairs. It is unobtrusive as it typically sits motionless on the forest understorey usually close to the ground.

IUCN has assessed this bird as near threatened and the population is believed to be declining. It is rare within its range but may possibly be overlooked due to its sedentary habits. Its main threat is habitat loss through deforestation, mining, land conversion and slash-and-burn.

It is found in multiple protected areas such as Mount Apo and Kitanglad Mountain Range but like all areas in the Philippines protection is lax.

There are no species specific conservation plans at the moment but conservation actions proposed by the IUCN Red List are to do surveys to better understand population and range and to better protect its habitat.
