= Goodfellow's tuco-tuco =

Conservation status
- Least Concern (IUCN 3.1)

Scientific classification
- Kingdom: Animalia
- Phylum: Chordata
- Class: Mammalia
- Order: Rodentia
- Family: Ctenomyidae
- Genus: Ctenomys
- Species: C. goodfellowi

Binomial name
- Ctenomys goodfellowi Thomas, 1921

Species of rodent

Goodfellow's tuco-tuco (Ctenomys goodfellowi) is a species of rodent in the family Ctenomyidae. It is endemic to Bolivia, where it is found in the Chiquitano dry forest ecoregion, bordering on the cerrado. Its karyotype has 2n = 46 and FN = 68. The species is named after British collector Walter Goodfellow.
