= Lyre-tailed king bird-of-paradise =

Scientific classification
- Domain: Eukaryota
- Kingdom: Animalia
- Phylum: Chordata
- Class: Aves
- Order: Passeriformes
- Superfamily: Corvoidea
- Family: Paradisaeidae
- Hybrid: Diphyllodes magnificus × Cicinnurus regius

Synonyms
- Cicinnurus lyogyrus Currie, 1900; Cicinnurus goodfellowi Ogilvie-Grant, 1907

Hybrid bird

The lyre-tailed king bird-of-paradise, also known as the lyre-tailed king, lonely little king or crimson bird-of-paradise, is a bird in the family Paradisaeidae that is a hybrid between a king bird-of-paradise and magnificent bird-of-paradise.

== King of Holland's bird-of-paradise ==
The King of Holland's bird of paradise, also known as King William III's bird of paradise or the exquisite little king, is a bird in the family Paradisaeidae that is a hybrid between a magnificent bird of paradise and king bird of paradise.

=== History ===
At least 26 adult male specimens of this hybrid exist in various collections, including the American Museum of Natural History and the Manchester Museum, coming mainly from north coastal New Guinea or unknown localities. It was described as a new species by Adolf Bernard Meyer in 1875 and diagnosed as a hybrid by Jacques Berlioz in 1927.

== History ==
At least three adult male specimens are known of this hybrid, coming from an altitude of 1000 m in the Cyclops Mountains, near Humboldt Bay on the northern coast of New Guinea, as well as unknown localities.
