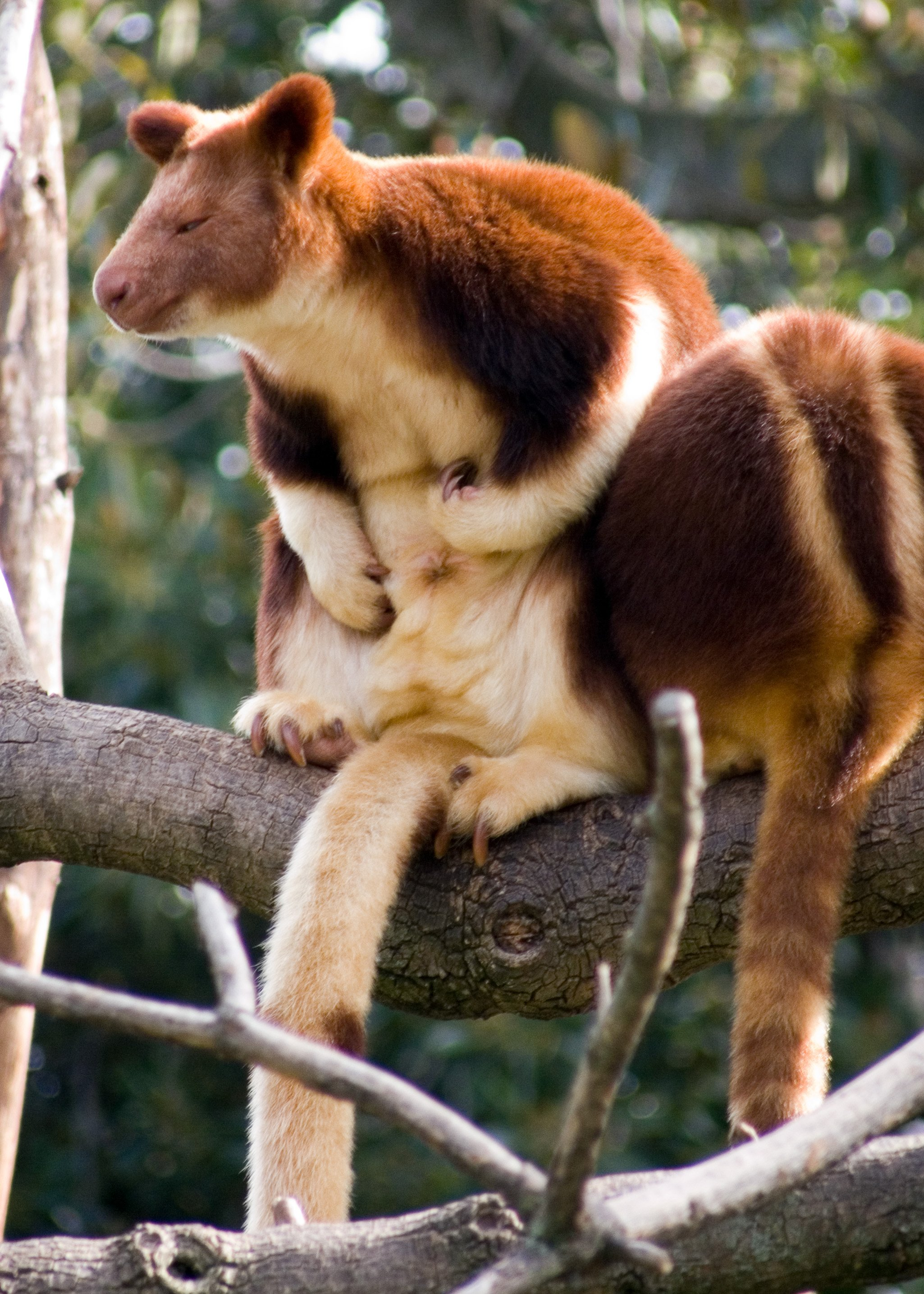

Conservation status
- Endangered (IUCN 3.1)

Scientific classification
- Kingdom: Animalia
- Phylum: Chordata
- Class: Mammalia
- Infraclass: Marsupialia
- Order: Diprotodontia
- Family: Macropodidae
- Genus: Dendrolagus
- Species: D. goodfellowi

Binomial name
- Dendrolagus goodfellowi Thomas, 1908
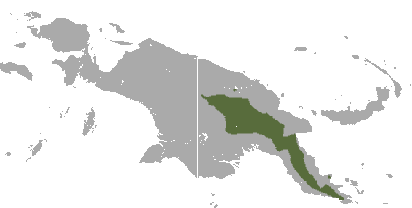
- Goodfellow's tree-kangaroo range

= Goodfellow's tree-kangaroo =

Species of marsupial

Goodfellow's tree-kangaroo (Dendrolagus goodfellowi), also called the ornate tree-kangaroo, is an endangered, long-tailed mammal native to rainforests of New Guinea. Like most tree-kangaroos (genus Dendrolagus), it lives in the treetops and feeds on leaves or other plant matter. It belongs to the macropod family (Macropodidae) along with kangaroos, and carries its young in a pouch like other marsupials. Its main threats are habitat loss and hunting. There are two subspecies: D. g. goodfellowi and D. g. buergersi (known as Buergers' tree-kangaroo).

== Name and taxonomy ==
The species name goodfellowi is in honour of British zoological collector Walter Goodfellow.

There are two subspecies of the Goodfellow's tree-kangaroo:

- Dendrolagus goodfellowi goodfellowi
- Dendrolagus goodfellowi buergersi – Buergers' tree-kangaroo

== Description ==
Like other tree-kangaroos, Goodfellow's tree-kangaroo is quite different in appearance from terrestrial kangaroos. Unlike its land dwelling cousins, its legs are not disproportionately large in comparison to the forelimbs, which are strong and end in hooked claws for grasping tree limbs, and it has a long tail for balance. All of these features help the species with a predominantly arboreal existence. It has short, woolly fur, usually chestnut to red-brown in colour, a grey-brown face, yellow-coloured cheeks and feet; a pale belly, a long, golden brown tail, and two golden stripes on its rear. It weighs approximately 7 kg (15 lb).

== Habitat ==
Goodfellow's tree-kangaroo lives in dense tropical rainforests and deciduous forests over mountain ranges, ranging from the border of central Irian Jaya in Indonesia to central and eastern Papua New Guinea.

== Behaviour ==
Goodfellow's tree-kangaroos prefer to spend their time in trees. On the ground, their tail requires them to lean forward to balance and they cannot move quickly. They climb trees by jumping while their forelimbs slide up the trunk of the tree. They have been known to jump to the ground from heights of 9 metres (30 ft) without harm.

=== Diet ===
Goodfellow's tree-kangaroo is a herbivore. Although they feed mainly on the leaves of the silkwood tree (Flindersia pimenteliana), other food is eaten when available, including various fruits, cereals, flowers and grasses. Goodfellow's tree-kangaroos have large stomachs that function as fermentation vats, similar to the stomachs of cattle and other ruminant herbivores, where bacteria break down fibrous leaves and grasses.

== See also ==
- Fauna of New Guinea
- Fauna of Indonesia
