= Schodde's bird-of-paradise =

Schodde's bird of paradise

Scientific classification
- Kingdom: Animalia
- Phylum: Chordata
- Class: Aves
- Order: Passeriformes
- Superfamily: Corvoidea
- Family: Paradisaeidae
- Hybrid: Parotia lawesii × Paradisaea rudolphi margaritae

Hybrid bird

Schodde's bird of paradise is a bird in the family Paradisaeidae that is an intergeneric hybrid between a Lawes's parotia and blue bird-of-paradise.

== History ==
Only one specimen, an adult female, is known of this hybrid. It is held in the Australian Museum and comes from Trepikama in the Baiyer Valley of Papua New Guinea. It was named by Clifford and Dawn Frith after Australian ornithologist Richard Schodde.
