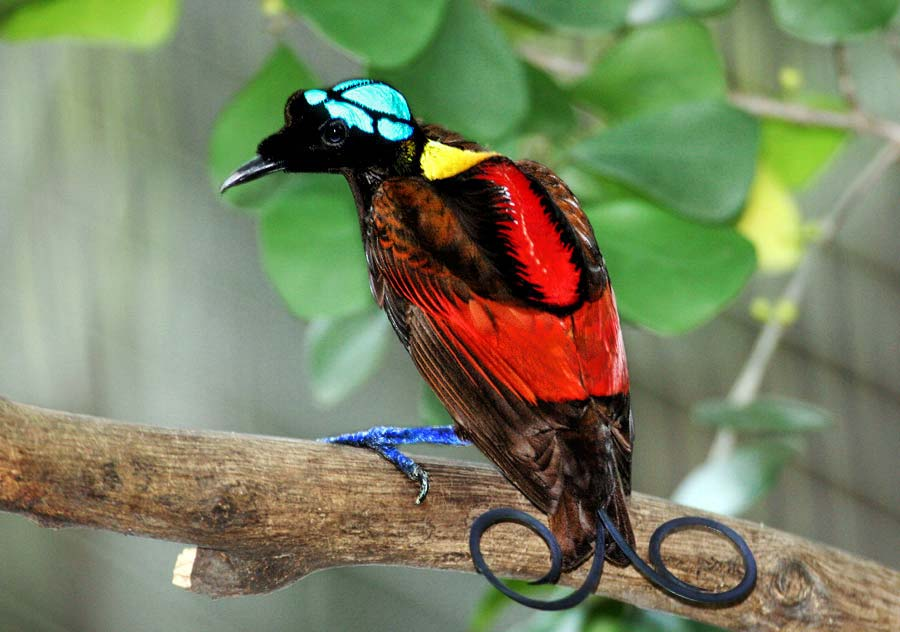
- Wilson's bird-of-paradise (Diphyllodes respublica)

Scientific classification
- Kingdom: Animalia
- Phylum: Chordata
- Class: Aves
- Order: Passeriformes
- Family: Paradisaeidae
- Genus: Diphyllodes; Lesson, RP, 1834

= Diphyllodes =

Genus of birds

Diphyllodes is a genus of birds-of-paradise. Established by René-Primevère Lesson in 1834, it contains two species: the magnificent bird-of-paradise and Wilson's bird-of-paradise. Both species are endemic to New Guinea, where they are found in forested uplands. The genus is sometimes subsumed into the genus Cicinnurus.

== Species ==
| Image | Scientific name | Common name | Distribution |
|---|---|---|---|
| | Diphyllodes magnificus (Pennant, 1781) | Magnificent bird-of-paradise | New Guinea |
| | Diphyllodes respublica (Bonaparte, 1850) | Wilson's bird-of-paradise | Raja Ampat Islands |
