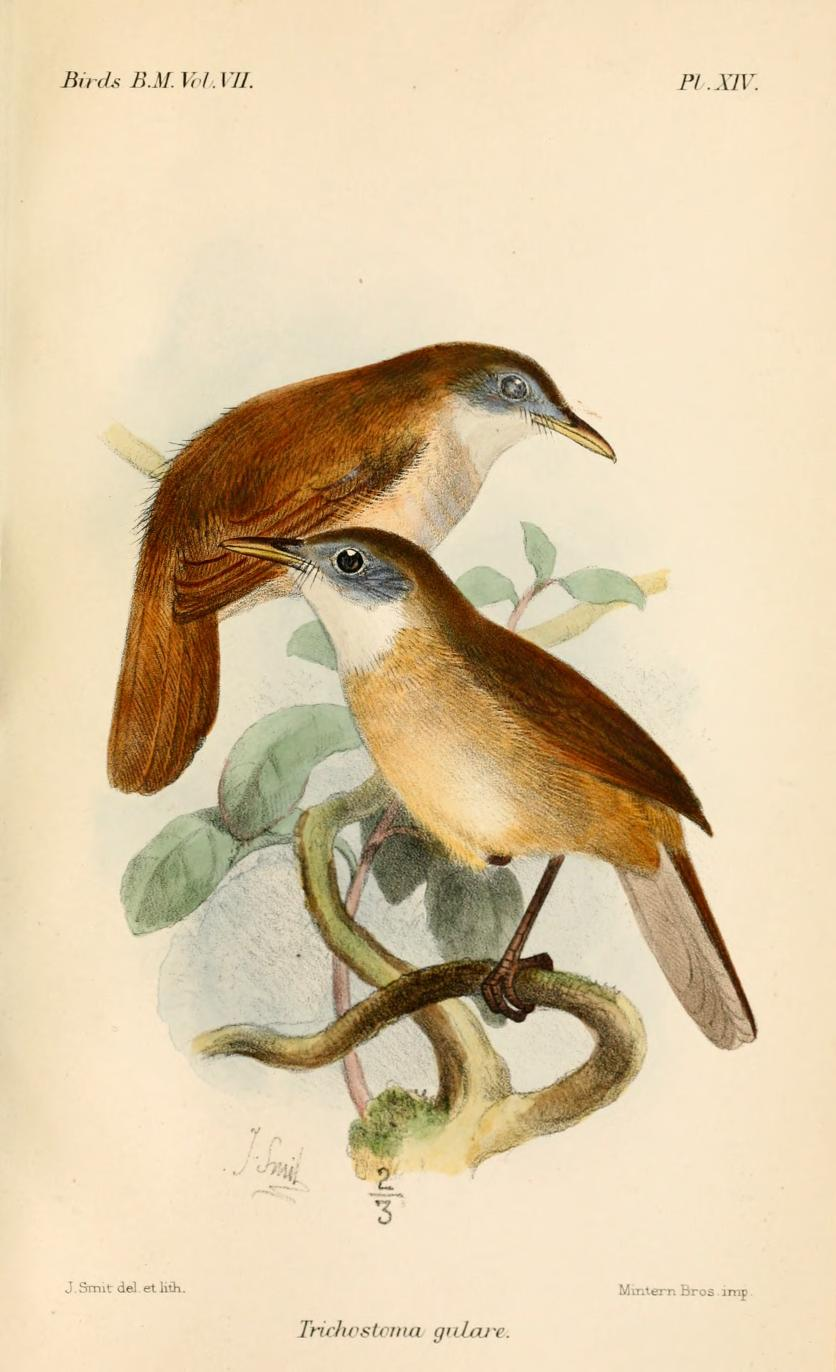
- Eyebrowed jungle flycatcher (Vauriella gularis)

Scientific classification
- Kingdom: Animalia
- Phylum: Chordata
- Class: Aves
- Order: Passeriformes
- Family: Muscicapidae
- Subfamily: Saxicolinae
- Genus: Vauriella; Wolters, 1980

Type species
- Rhinomyias insignis Ogilvie-Grant, 1895

= Vauriella =

Genus of birds

Vauriella is a genus of birds in the Old World flycatcher family Muscicapidae that occur in Borneo and the Philippines.

The species were previously placed in the genus Rhinomyias but were moved to Vauriella when a detailed molecular phylogenetic study published in 2010 found that Rhinomyias was polyphyletic. The genus Vauriella had been introduced by the German ornithologist Hans Wolters in 1980 with the type species as Rhinomyias insignis Ogilvie-Grant, 1895, the white-browed jungle flycatcher. The genus name is a diminutive honouring the French/US ornithologist Charles Vaurie.

The genus contains four species:

Image	Common name	Scientific name	Distribution
	Eyebrowed jungle flycatcher	Vauriella gularis	mountains of northern Borneo (Mount Kinabalu and adjacent mountains)
	White-browed jungle flycatcher	Vauriella insignis	montane forest of northern Luzon (northern Philippines)
	White-throated jungle flycatcher	Vauriella albigularis	Philippines (lowlands of Negros and Guimaras)
	Slaty-backed jungle flycatcher	Vauriella goodfellowi	montane forest of Mount Apo on Mindanao (southern Philippines)

There are also several species called "jungle flycatcher" in the genus Cyornis.
