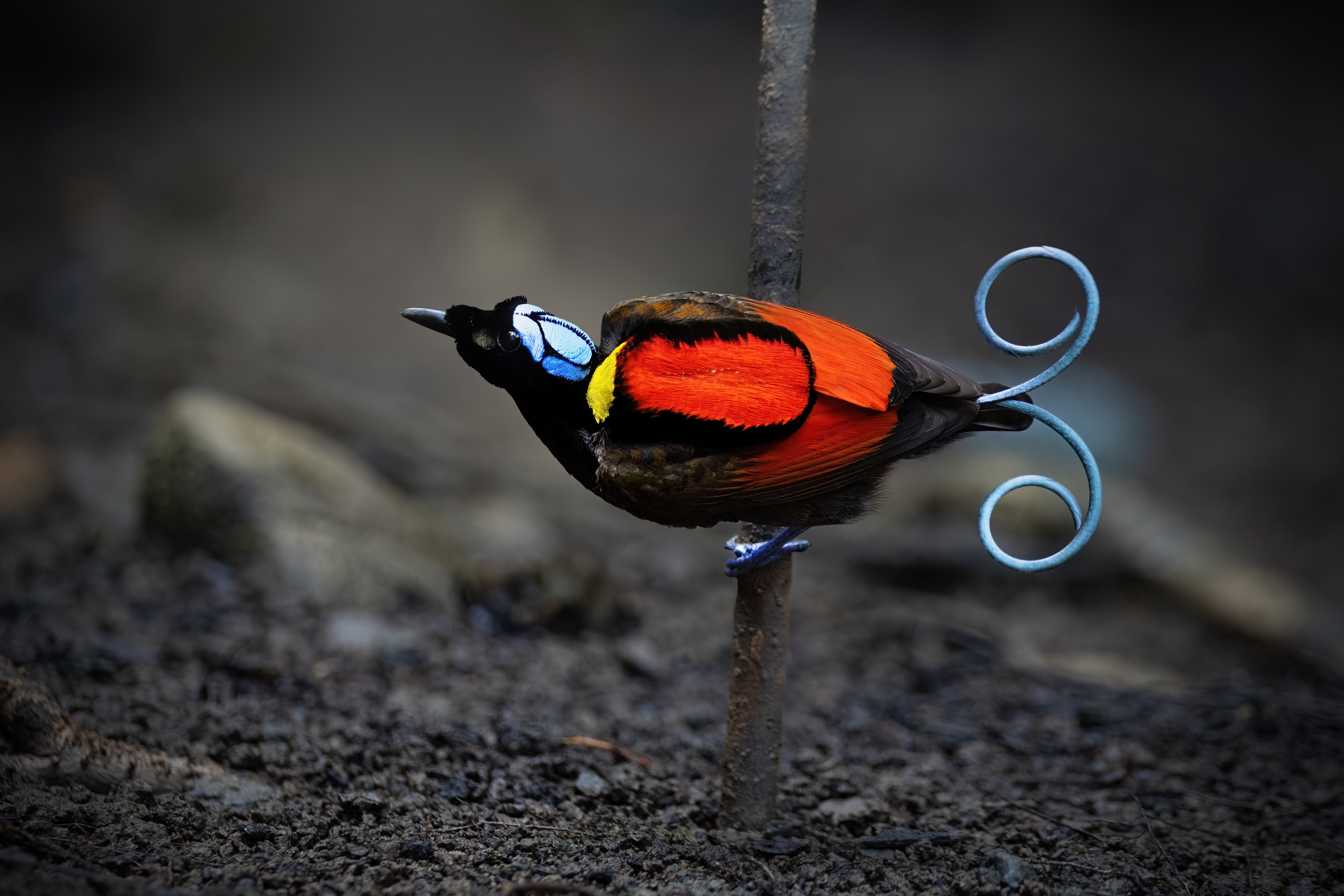
- Male

Conservation status
- Near Threatened (IUCN 3.1)

Scientific classification
- Kingdom: Animalia
- Phylum: Chordata
- Class: Aves
- Order: Passeriformes
- Family: Paradisaeidae
- Genus: Diphyllodes
- Species: D. respublica

Binomial name
- Diphyllodes respublica (Bonaparte, 1850)

Synonyms
- Cicinnurus respublica (Bonaparte, 1850); Cicinnurus respublika (misspelling)

= Wilson's bird-of-paradise =

Species of bird

Wilson's bird-of-paradise (Diphyllodes respublica) is a species of passerine bird of the family Paradisaeidae.

The first footage of the Wilson's bird-of-paradise ever to be filmed was recorded in 1996 by David Attenborough for the BBC documentary Attenborough in Paradise. He did so by dropping leaves on the forest floor, which irritated the bird into clearing them away.

== Nomenclature ==
The controversial scientific name respublica of this species was given by Charles Lucien Bonaparte, Napoleon's nephew and a republican idealist. The habit of zoologists at that time to dedicate newly discovered species to some king, queen, or aristocrat deeply irritated him. In order to assert his convictions, he chose to name this species respublica to honour the republic and not the royalty.

Charles Lucien Bonaparte described the bird from a badly damaged trade specimen purchased by British ornithologist Edward Wilson. In doing so, he beat John Cassin, who wanted to name the bird in honour of Wilson, by several months. Thirteen years later, in 1863, the German zoologist Heinrich Agathon Bernstein discovered the home grounds of the Wilson's bird-of-paradise on Waigeo Island.

== Distribution ==
An Indonesian endemic, the Wilson's bird-of-paradise is distributed to the hill and lowland rainforests of Waigeo and Batanta Islands off West Papua.

Due to ongoing habitat loss, limited range, and exploitation, the Wilson's bird-of-paradise is evaluated as Near Threatened on the IUCN Red List of Threatened Species. It is listed in Appendix II of the Convention on International Trade in Endangered Species of Wild Fauna and Flora (CITES).

== Habitat ==
Its preferred habitat is the hill forest at 300 m of altitude, more rarely the lowland rainforest and the middle mountain forest.

== Description ==
Wilson's bird-of-paradise is rather small. Males can reach a length of 16 centimetres (6.3 in) (21 cm including central rectrices) and a weight of 53–67 g., while females can reach a length of 16 cm, but a weight of 52–60 g. The male is a red and black bird-of-paradise, with a yellow mantle on its neck, light green mouth, rich blue feet, and two curved violet tail feathers. The head is naked blue, with a black double cross pattern on it. The female is a brownish bird with a bare blue crown.

In the field, the blue bare skin on the crown of the bird's head is so vivid that it is clearly visible by night; the deep scarlet back and velvet green breast are lush, the curlicue tail gleaming bright silver.

== Diet ==
Their diet consists of fruits, insects, arthropods, and other small invertebrates.

== Rituals of seduction ==
Males of this species clear an area of rainforest to create a 'display court'. Here, they perform an elaborate mating dance to impress a potential mate. The male usually exhibits its breast shield and accompanies the mating dance with vocalizations described as "squeaky twittering interspersed with guttural notes."

== Courtship behavior ==
Male Wilson's birds-of-paradise are the most colorful of all the species within the family, possessing a veritable rainbow of color. This remarkable example of hue and iridescence possesses all of the primary colors (and more) in different ways. The baby blue hue of its head is skin, not feathers, and is the result of structural color absent in any other member of birds-of-paradise. Yellow on the nape of its neck, followed by the crimson on its back are consistent, pigmented colors, present year-round. Its quirky, "handlebar-mustache-shaped" tail feathers are brilliantly iridescent, reflecting light to produce intense color to the eye of the beholder.

The sexual dimorphism of the species leaves the female very drab in comparison. Sexual dimorphism, or the difference in physical appearance between the sexes, is the result of female selection, in which females select males based upon indirect genetic benefits which increase offspring fitness. Because this species is polygynous, where one male mates with multiple females, the female is left on her own to raise young, forcing her to assess these indirect genetic benefits through courtship rituals, details of which are in the following section.

=== Dance ===
While these birds are difficult to locate in the wild and have not been studied in-depth, footage of the few mating rituals that have been witnessed for this species tells all. This species territorially defends a "court" in which it performs its vocalizations and physical maneuvers. Males will continually work to keep this area free of debris, making sure that nothing on the ground will distract from their displays. Males will perch on a vertical branch in the middle of their court, flexing their brilliant green fluorescent collar and calling out to females to attract them to their site. Females who are interested will perch above the male on the branch and watch as he weaves back and forth, calling to her and flexing the fluorescent collar. From the female's perspective, the male appears to be a brilliant green disc as he displays, and he will display his fluorescent inner mouth for additional coloration. This phenomenal display of color demonstrates the power of female sexual selection over male appearance and behavior in the animal kingdom.

== Bibliography ==
- Beehler, B.M., T.K. Pratt & D.A.Zimmerman 1986. Birds of New Guinea. Princeton University Press. ISBN 0-691-02394-8.
- Frith, C. B. & Frith, D. W. (2009). Family Paradisaeidae (Birds of Paradise). In del Hoyo, J. Elliott, A. & Christie, D. Handbook of the Birds of the World. Bush-shrikes to Old World Sparrows. Vol. 14. pp. 404–459. Lynx Edicions, Barcelona.
- Morten Strange. A Photographic Guide to the Birds of Indonesia. — Princeton University Press, 2003. — С. 382. — 416 с. — ISBN 978-0691114958.
- Ottaviani, M. (2012). Les Oiseaux de Paradis – Histoire Naturelle et photographies, 320 pages. Editions Prin, France.
