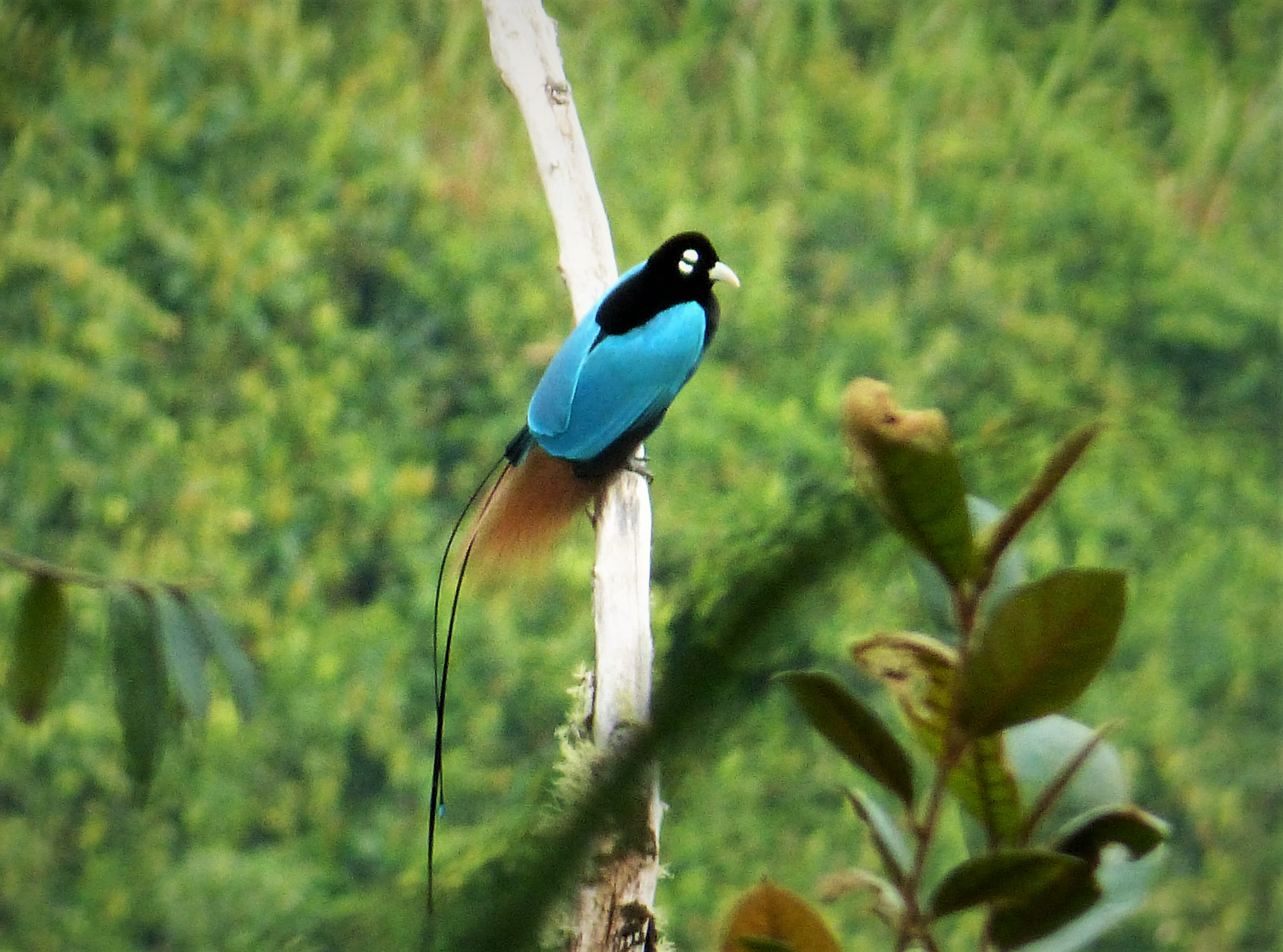

Conservation status
- Near Threatened (IUCN 3.1)

Scientific classification
- Kingdom: Animalia
- Phylum: Chordata
- Class: Aves
- Order: Passeriformes
- Family: Paradisaeidae
- Genus: Paradisornis; Finsch & Meyer, A.B., 1886
- Species: P. rudolphi

Binomial name
- Paradisornis rudolphi Finsch & Meyer, AB, 1886
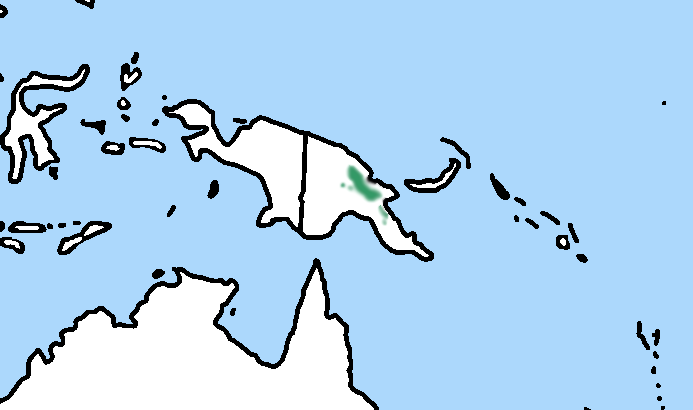
- Range of P. rudolphi

Synonyms
- Paradisaea rudolphi (Finsch & A.B. Meyer, 1885)

= Blue bird-of-paradise =

Species of bird

The blue bird-of-paradise (Paradisornis rudolphi) is a large species of bird-of-paradise. It is the only species in the genus Paradisornis, but was previously included in the genus Paradisaea.

It has flank feathers present only in males and the two long wires also only found in the males.

== Taxonomy ==
The blue bird-of-paradise was formally described in 1886 by the German naturalists Otto Finsch and Adolf Bernhard Meyer. They placed the bird in a new genus Paradisornis and coined the binomial name Paradisornis rudolphi. The genus name Paradisornis combines the Ancient Greek paradeisos meaning "paradise" with ornis meaning "bird". The specific epithet rudolphi was chosen to honour Archduke Rudolf Franz Karl Joseph, the Crown-Prince of Austria, who was deeply interested in ornithology. This species was formerly placed in the genus Paradisaea.

Two subspecies are recognised:

- P. r. margaritae (Mayr & Gilliard, 1951) – east central New Guinea
- P. r. rudolphi Finsch & Meyer, AB, 1886 – southeast New Guinea

The blue bird-of-paradise is known to have hybridized with Lawes's parotia (Parotia lawesii), which is called "Schodde's bird-of-paradise", and also with the Raggiana bird-of-paradise (Paradisaea raggiana).

== Description ==
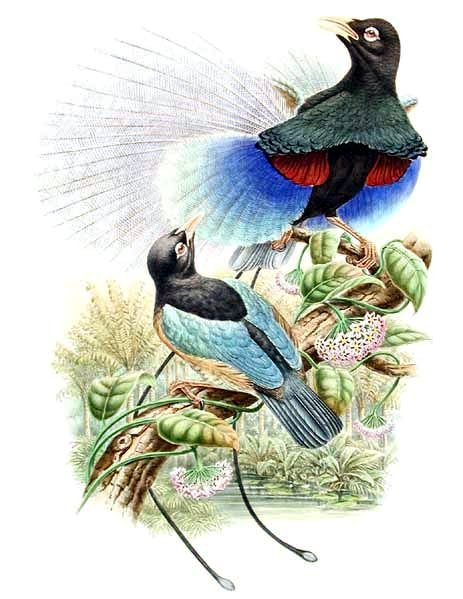
19th century illustration by Richard Bowdler Sharpe

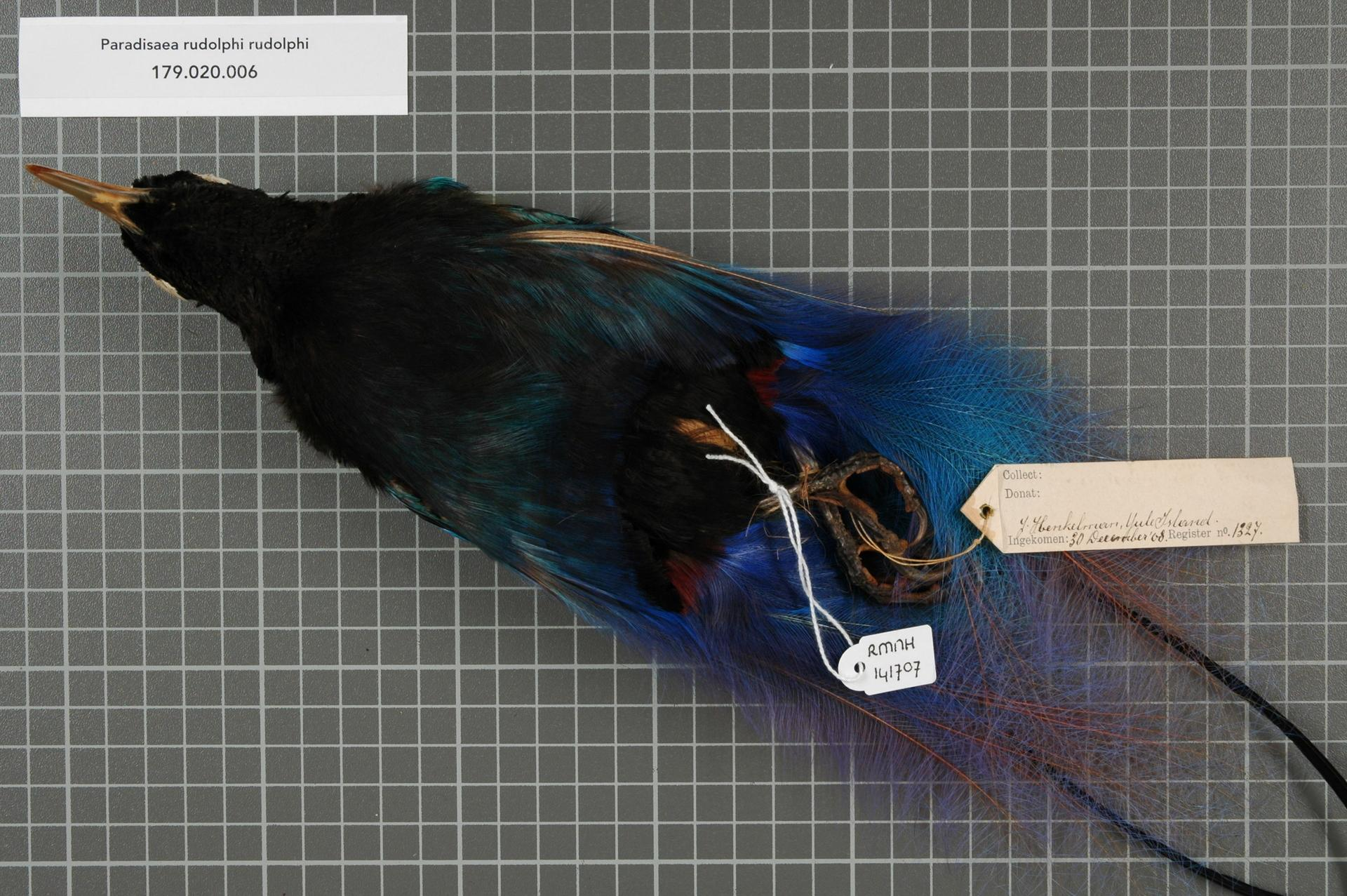
Nominate male specimen at the Naturalis Biodiversity Center. More of its sexual ornamentation can be seen ventrally.

The blue bird-of-paradise is around 30 cm (12 in) in length (excluding the long tail wires), rivaling some of the Paradisaea and Manucodia species. It typically weighs between 124 and 166 g (4.4 and 5.9 oz). Males tend to be larger than females. This species is sexually dimorphic, though maintains a lot of similarities between the two sexes. Males are glossy black from their heads to mantle with silver-white crescents surrounding the eyes. These feathers are iridescent, ranging from a red gloss on the neck to blues on the mantle. They have a blackish-blue underbelly. Their wings and tails are blue, commonly being a light blue, but can aqua or a sky-baby blue. Unique to the males are its two elongated central tail feathers which are blue-black with iridescent, whitish spatulate tips. These 'wires' are 64 cm (25 in) long. They also sport fine and silky elongated flank plumes that are a dull amber colour on the upper side, a light blue below, and are based by two dark crimson lines on each side of the lower belly. Females are similar in coloration to males; however, their plumage is less iridescent and their underbellies are a chestnut brown. Juvenile females have black barring on their underbelly. Both sexes have a very crow-like, light grey bill. They have purplish-grey legs and feet and greyer claws.

== Behaviour and ecology ==
=== Diet ===
The blue bird-of-paradise is mainly a frugivorous species, feeding on a good variety of fruits like figs, drupes, and berries, but animal prey is also present in the diet; it not only includes insects, but also some vertebrates like reptiles. They typically feed alone, though females and juveniles are more likely to feed in trees in association with other birds or other species. They are shown to search high in the canopy when seeking fruits and apparently forage at lower altitudes when in search of their animal prey.

=== Breeding ===
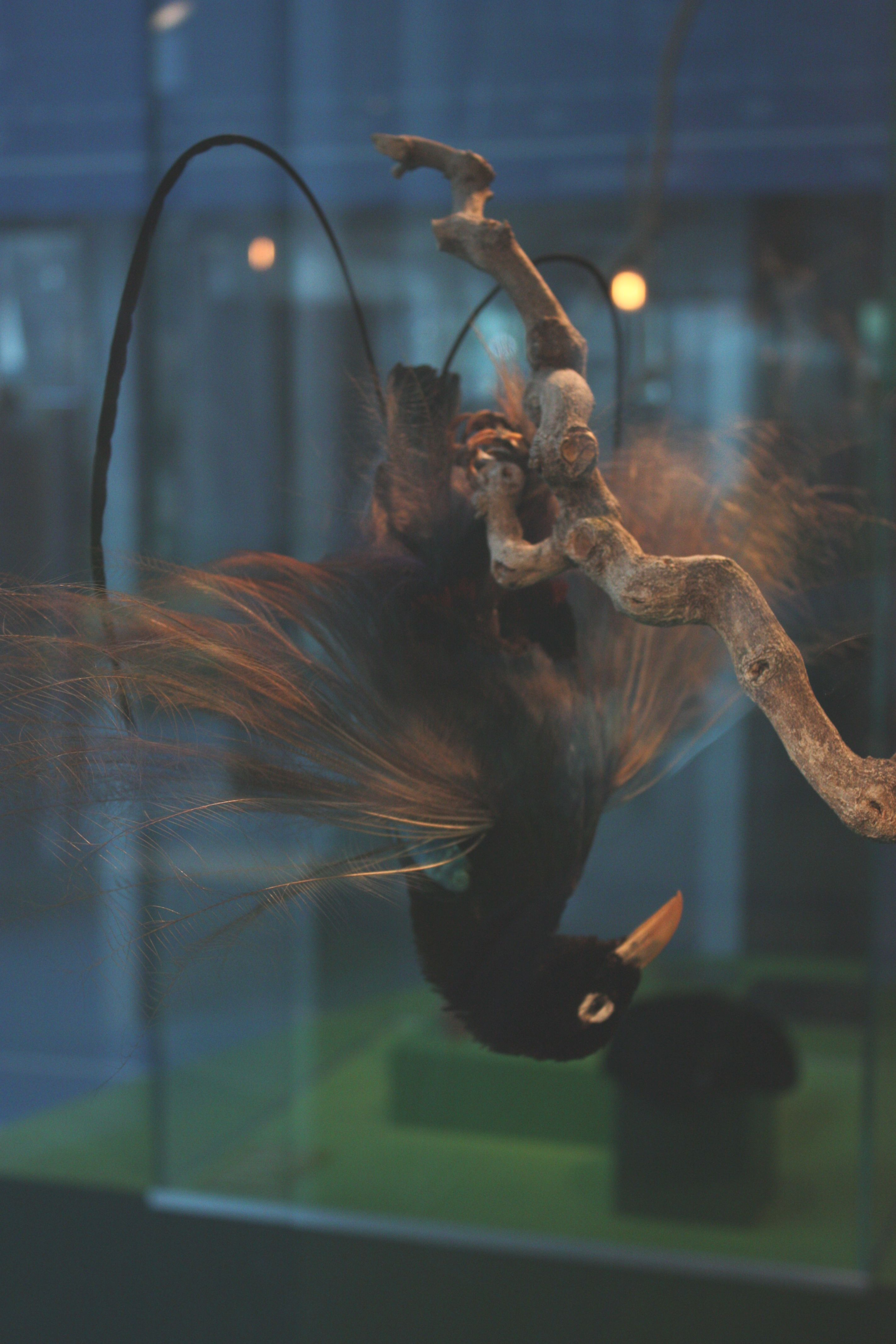
A male specimen preserved in its display posture. The bird arranges itself upside down and spreads out its glorious "fountain" of blue flank plumes, with a black and red-edged oval in or near the center of the figure, and two elongated, bulbous-tipped tail wires flailing around its body.

The male is polygamous and performs a breathtaking courtship display. But unlike most other birds of paradise species, he performs solitary on a preferably thin branch, while an attending female observes nearby. In the display, the male hangs from a branch upside down. The black oval with a red margin at the center of his chest is rhythmically enlarged and contracted. His violet-blue plumes spread out in a fan, looking like an apron, swaying its body back and forth while the black wires form two impressive arches down to either side. During this display, he continuously makes a soft, insect-like buzzing noise, mixed with a chittering or chattering noise to rope the female back in if she moves away.

The nesting and parental duties are covered only by the females; she builds her nest with stems, twigs, palm leaves, vines, and other materials all by herself, usually in a flat cup-like shape. They mostly lay one egg, but two are less occasional, and the mother is very defensive of her brood. The eggs are described to be a salmon-type color, with the ends being ringed with flecks of cinnamon-rufous to tawny.

== Status and conservation ==
Due to ongoing habitat loss, limited range, small population size, and, in some areas, hunting for its highly prized plumes, the rare blue bird-of-paradise is classified as Near Threatened on the IUCN Red List of Threatened Species. It is listed in Appendix II of CITES. Its population is thought to have a decreasing trend, estimated to be anywhere from 2,500 to 10,000 individuals.

== Gallery ==
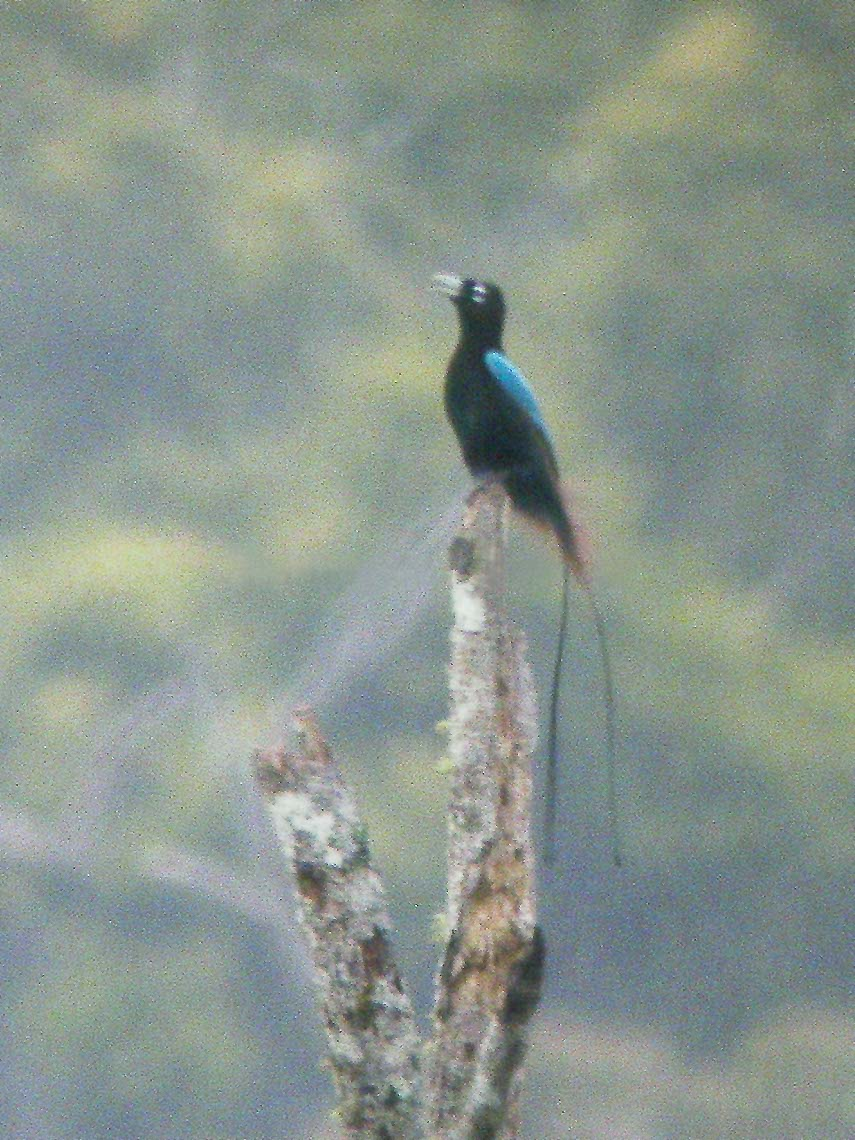
Perched male.

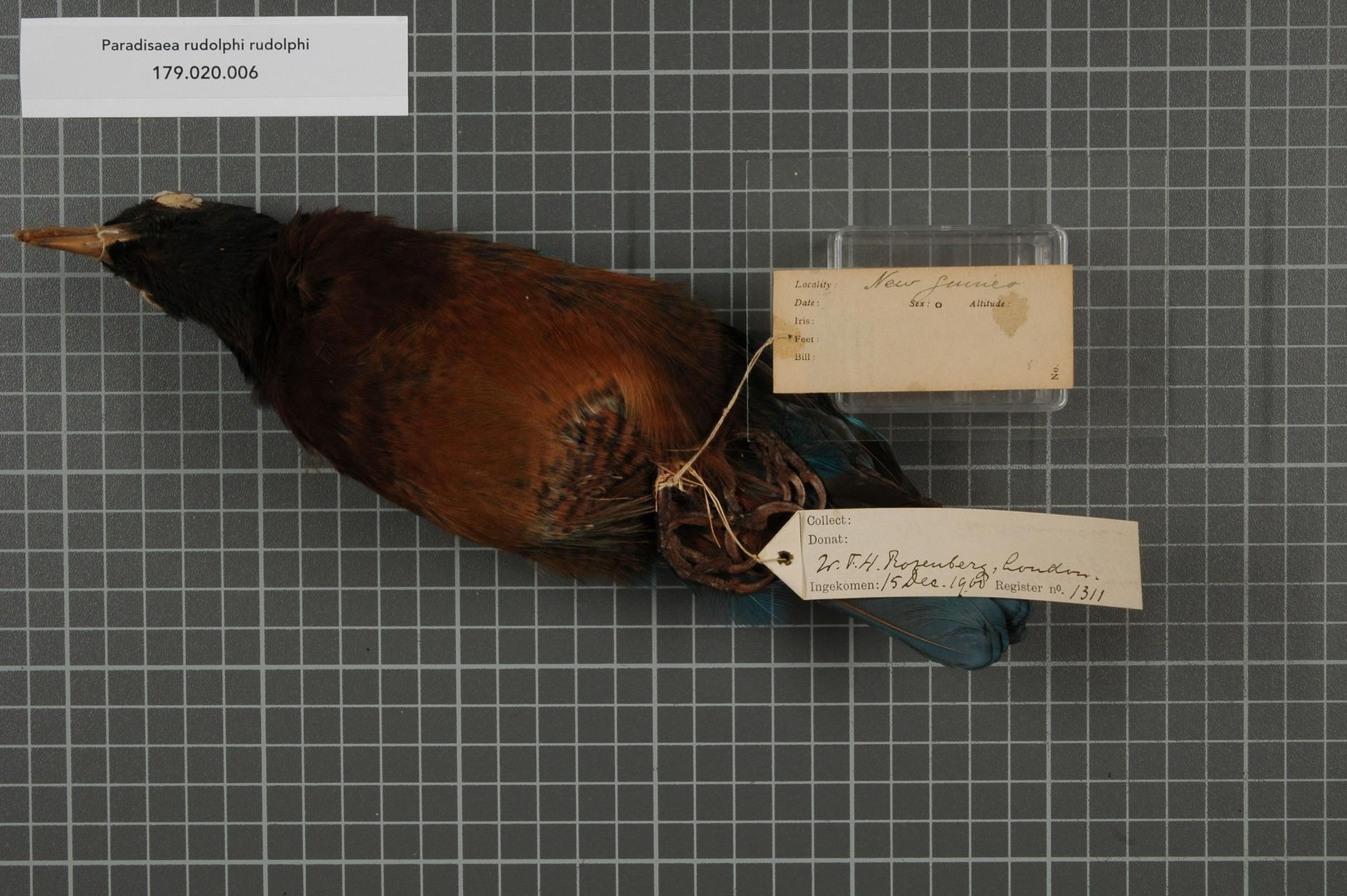
Ventral view of a nominate female specimen. Note its lack of flank plumes and tail wires that the male sports.

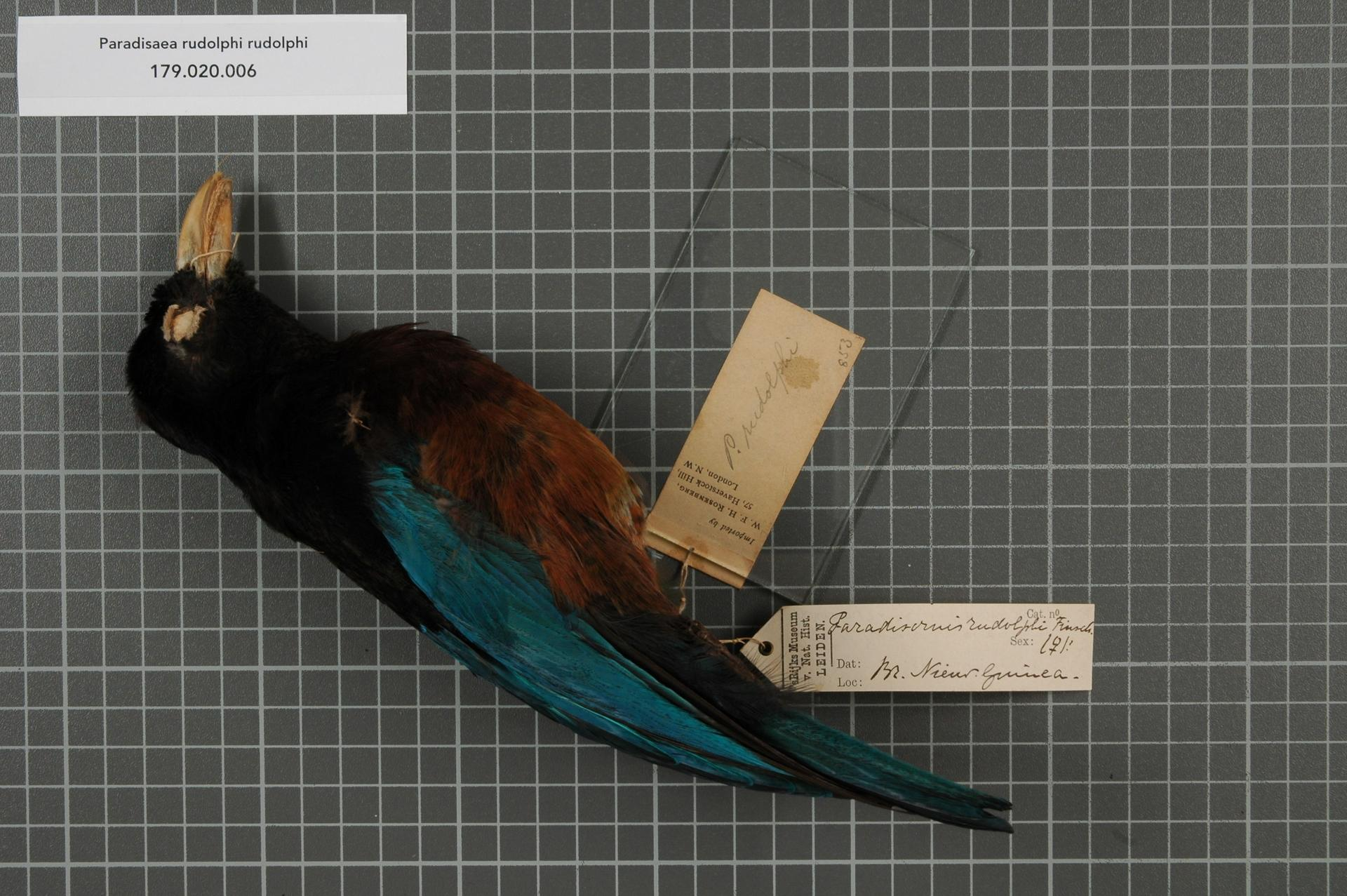
Side view of a female specimen. The female, like the male, has blue wings and tail.

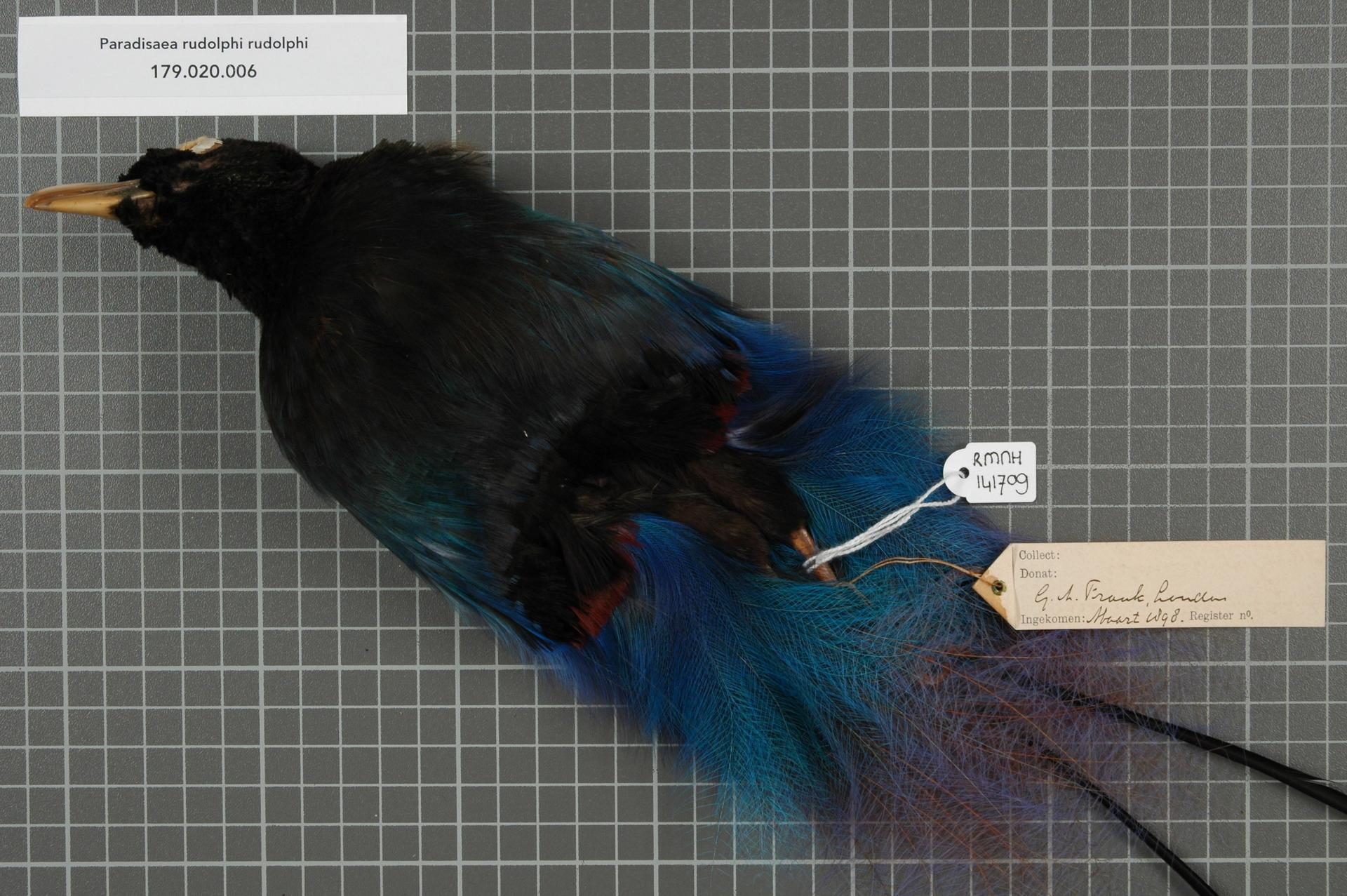
Male specimen.

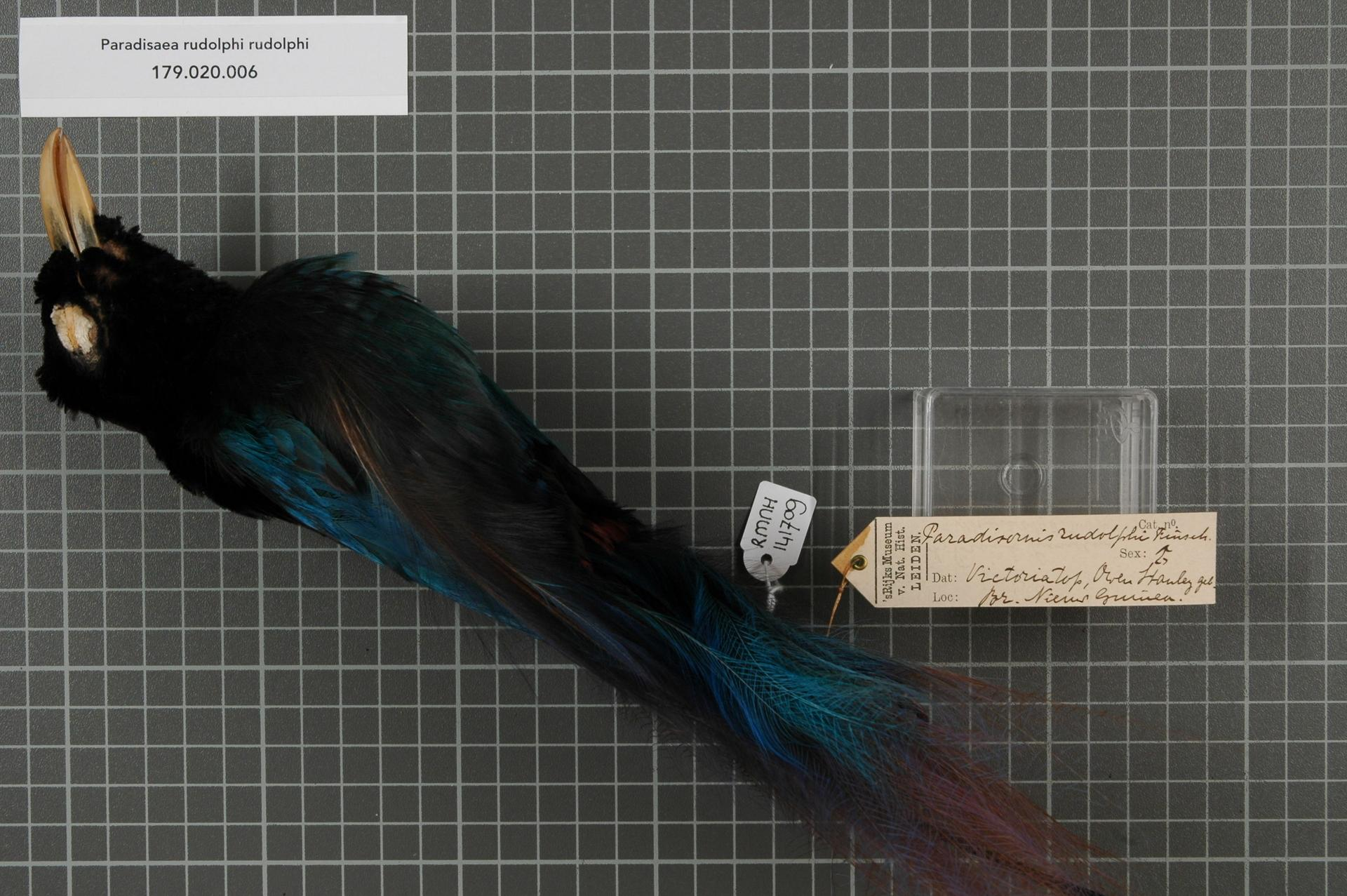
Side view of a male specimen.

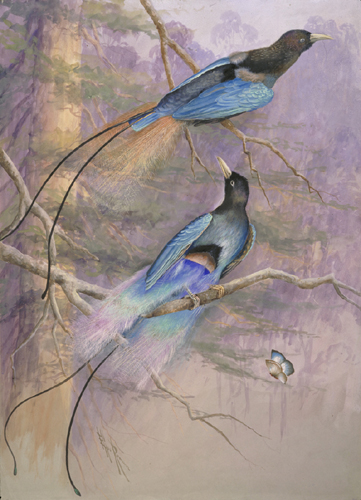
Illustration of two male blue birds-of-paradise.

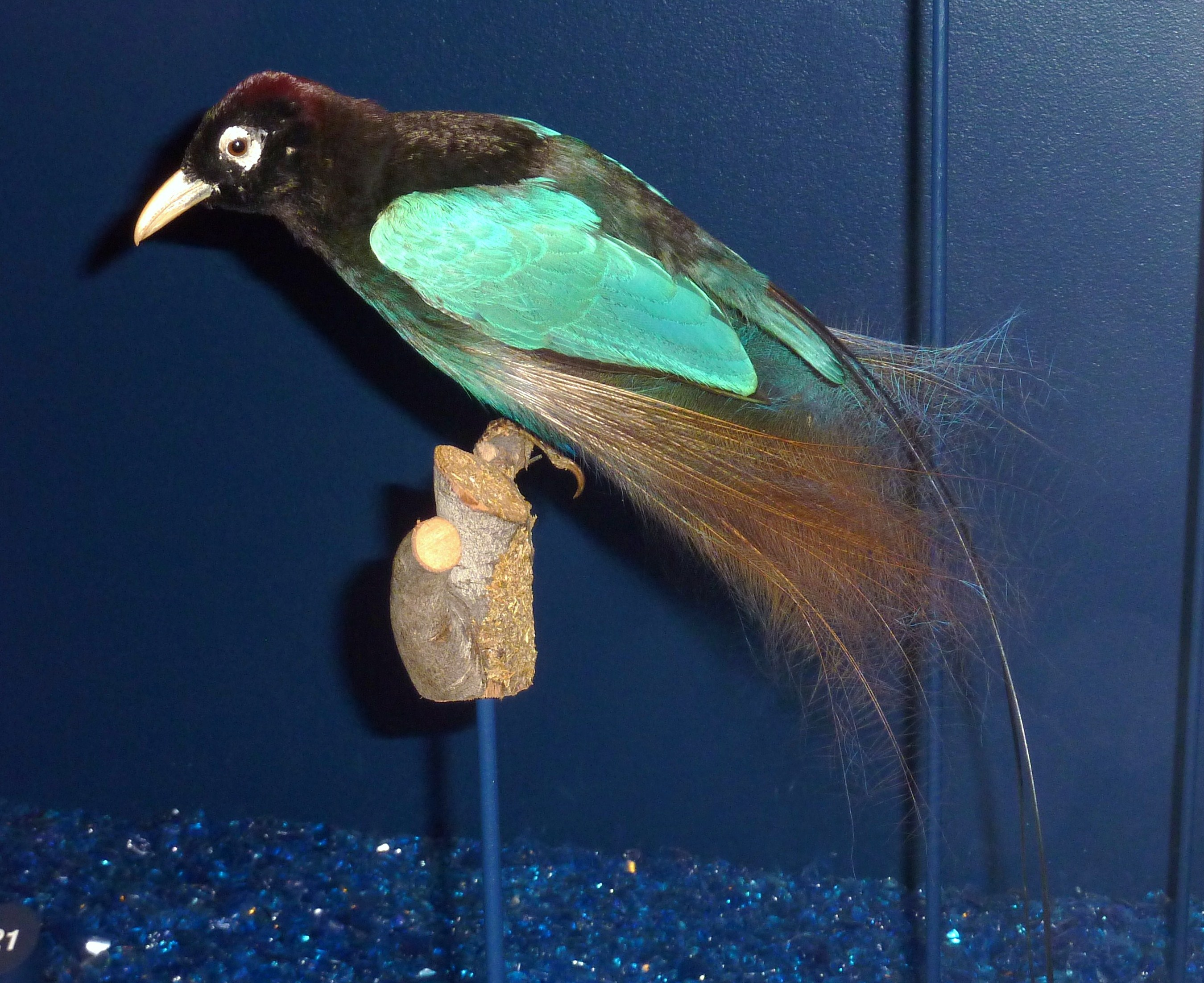
Male specimen in a perched position.

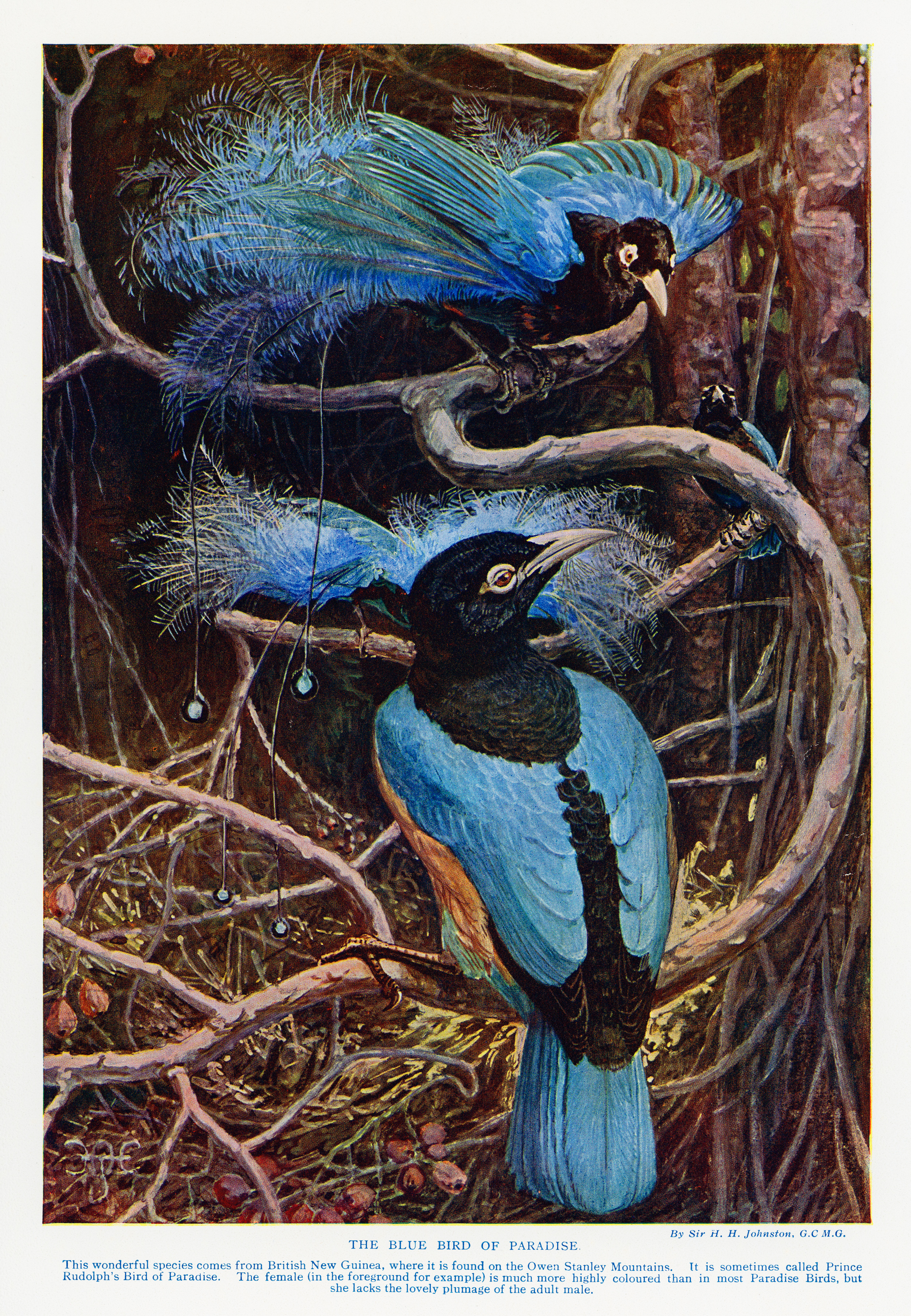
Illustration of two male and a female, most likely an early conception of the species.
