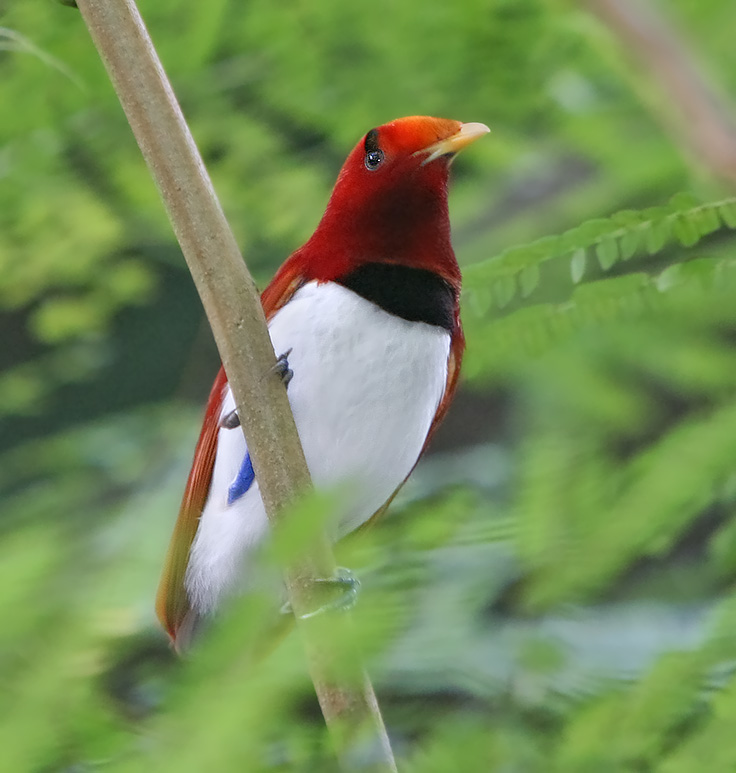
- Male

Conservation status
- Least Concern (IUCN 3.1)

Scientific classification
- Kingdom: Animalia
- Phylum: Chordata
- Class: Aves
- Order: Passeriformes
- Family: Paradisaeidae
- Genus: Cicinnurus; Vieillot, 1816
- Species: C. regius

Binomial name
- Cicinnurus regius (Linnaeus, 1758)

Synonyms
- Paradisaea regia Linnaeus, 1758

= King bird-of-paradise =

Species of bird

The king bird-of-paradise (Cicinnurus regius) is a passerine bird of the Paradisaeidae (bird-of-paradise) family. It is considered by the IOC checklist to be the only member of the genus Cicinnurus, although the genus Diphyllodes is closely related and is subsumed under Cicinnurus by many other authorities.

The king bird-of-paradise is a common and wide-ranging species, distributed throughout lowland forests of New Guinea and western satellite islands. Some populations range quite high into the hills and lower mountains, and these are poorly known as yet.

The first captive breeding of this species was by Sten Bergman of Sweden in 1958. He was awarded a commemorative medal by the Foreign Bird League to mark this achievement.

== Taxonomy ==
The king bird-of-paradise was formally described in 1758 by the Swedish naturalist Carl Linnaeus in the tenth edition of his Systema Naturae under the binomial name Paradisaea regius. The type locality is the Aru Islands. It is now the only species placed in the genus Cicinnurus that was introduced in 1816 by the French ornithologist Louis Pierre Vieillot. The genus name combines the Ancient Greek κικιννος/kikinnos meaning "ringlet" or "curled lock of hair" with ουρα/oura meaning "tail. The specific epithet regius is Latin meaning "kingly".

Two subspecies are recognised:

- C. r. regius (Linnaeus, 1758) – south New Guinea, west Papuan islands and Aru Islands (southwest of New Guinea)
- C. r. coccineifrons Rothschild, 1896 – north, central, and east New Guinea, and Yapen Island (off northwest New Guinea)

== Description ==
This so-called "living gem" is the smallest and most vividly colored among birds-of-paradise.

The king bird-of-paradise is small, measuring approximately 6.3–7.5 inches (16–19 cm) long, but 12.2 inches (31 cm) if central rectrices of adult males included. Females weigh about 0.08–0.13 pounds (36–59 g), males 0.10–0.14 pounds (45–64 g).

The adult male has an overall metallic crimson color, slightly orange under certain lights, and more particularly so in the crown. They have a narrow, dark green iridescent breast band with whitish lower breast, and green-tipped fan-like plumes on the shoulder. The feathers of the undertail and mantle are olive-brown, with iridescent green tips, and violet legs. Bills are ivory-yellow. Females have dull olive heads and upperparts with yellowish underparts and violet legs.

== Distribution and habitat ==
The king bird-of-paradise is distributed throughout the majority of lowland New Guinea mainland, and on the surrounding islands, including Aru, Salawati, Missol, and Yapen, inhabiting mostly lowland rainforests, gallery forests, forest edges, and disturbed and tall secondary forests.

== Ecology and behaviour ==
There is little information available about this species' behavior. They are inconspicuous and may be hard to locate, except for males at their display trees.

=== Courtship and breeding ===
The species is polygynous, with the promiscuous adult males displaying in isolation at exploded leks and in groups at traditional arboreal courts. They are perhaps more persistent callers than any other birds of paradise. Courtship involves complex vocalizations, feather manipulations, and a variety of body posturing and movements, including hanging fully inverted and pendulum-like swinging. An extraordinary courtship display is performed by the male with a series of tail swinging, fluffing of the white abdominal feathers that makes the bird look like a cotton ball, and acrobatic movements of their elongated tail wires.

Breeding occurs at least during March through October. The open cup nest is built into a tree cavity (unique within the family), within which two eggs are laid. The female builds the nest and cares for the young without male assistance. In captivity, incubation lasted 17 days and the nestling period was 14 days.

=== Feeding and diet ===
The diet consists mainly of fruits and arthropods. Foraging occurs at all forest levels, where birds often join mixed-species foraging flocks to seek arthropods in the lower forest.

== Conservation status ==
The species is tentatively assessed as being in decline due to habitat loss and unsustainable levels of hunting. However, despite the fact that the population trend appears to be decreasing, being a widespread and abundant species throughout their large habitat range, the king bird-of-paradise is evaluated as Least Concern on the IUCN Red List of Threatened Species. It is listed in Appendix II of CITES.
