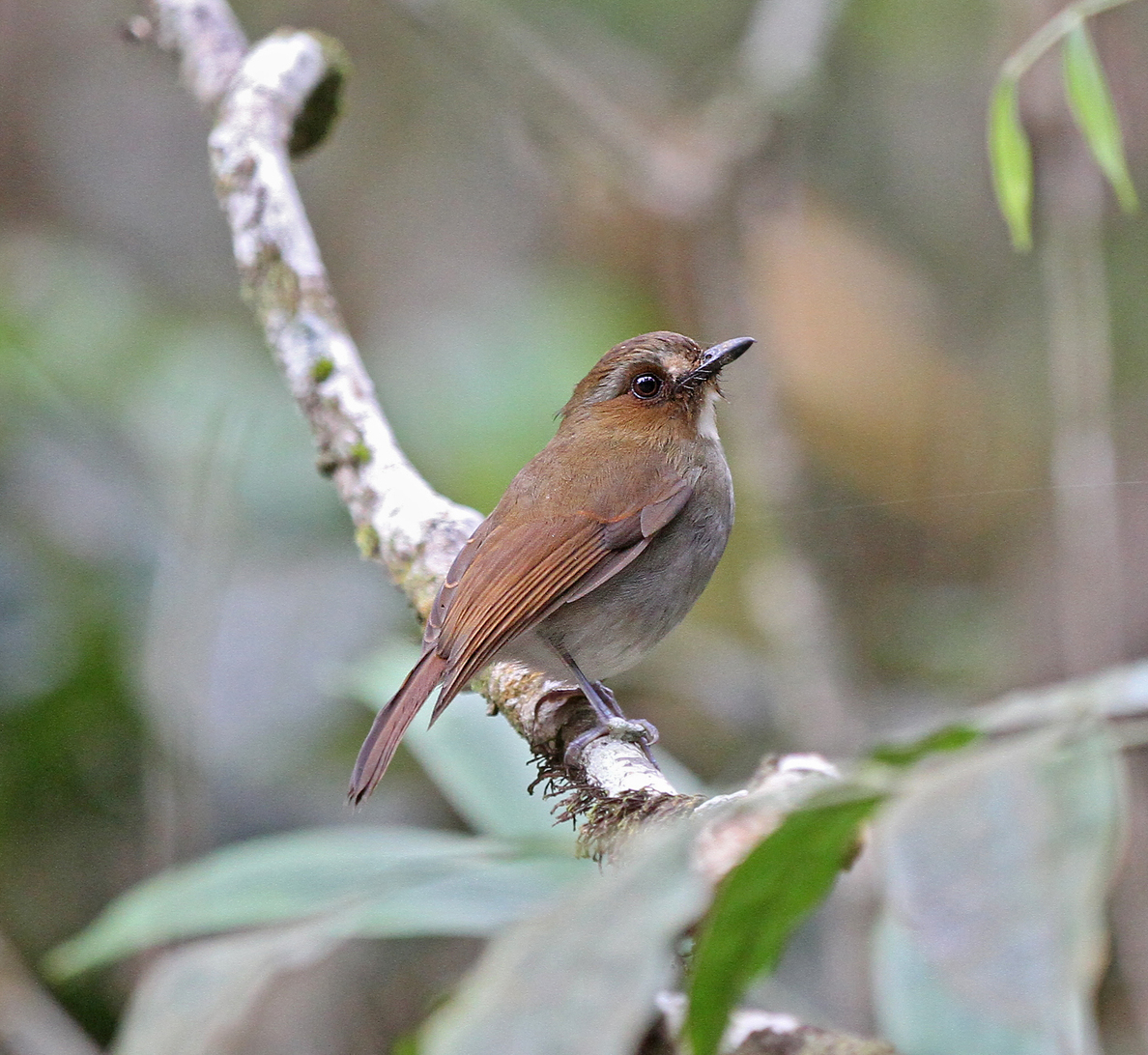

Conservation status
- Least Concern (IUCN 3.1)

Scientific classification
- Kingdom: Animalia
- Phylum: Chordata
- Class: Aves
- Order: Passeriformes
- Family: Muscicapidae
- Genus: Vauriella
- Species: V. gularis

Binomial name
- Vauriella gularis (Sharpe, 1888)

Synonyms
- Trichostoma gulare; Rhinomyias gulare

= Eyebrowed jungle flycatcher =

Species of bird

The eyebrowed jungle flycatcher (Vauriella gularis) is a species of bird in the Old World flycatcher family Muscicapidae. It is endemic to the island of Borneo (elevated areas, including the Meratus Mountains). The natural habitat of the eyebrowed jungle flycatcher is subtropical or tropical moist montane forests. It builds an open, mossy cup nest, generally in epiphytes or spiny palms.

This species was previously placed in the genus Rhinomyias but was moved to Vauriella when a molecular phylogenetic study published in 2010 found that Rhinomyias was polyphyletic.
