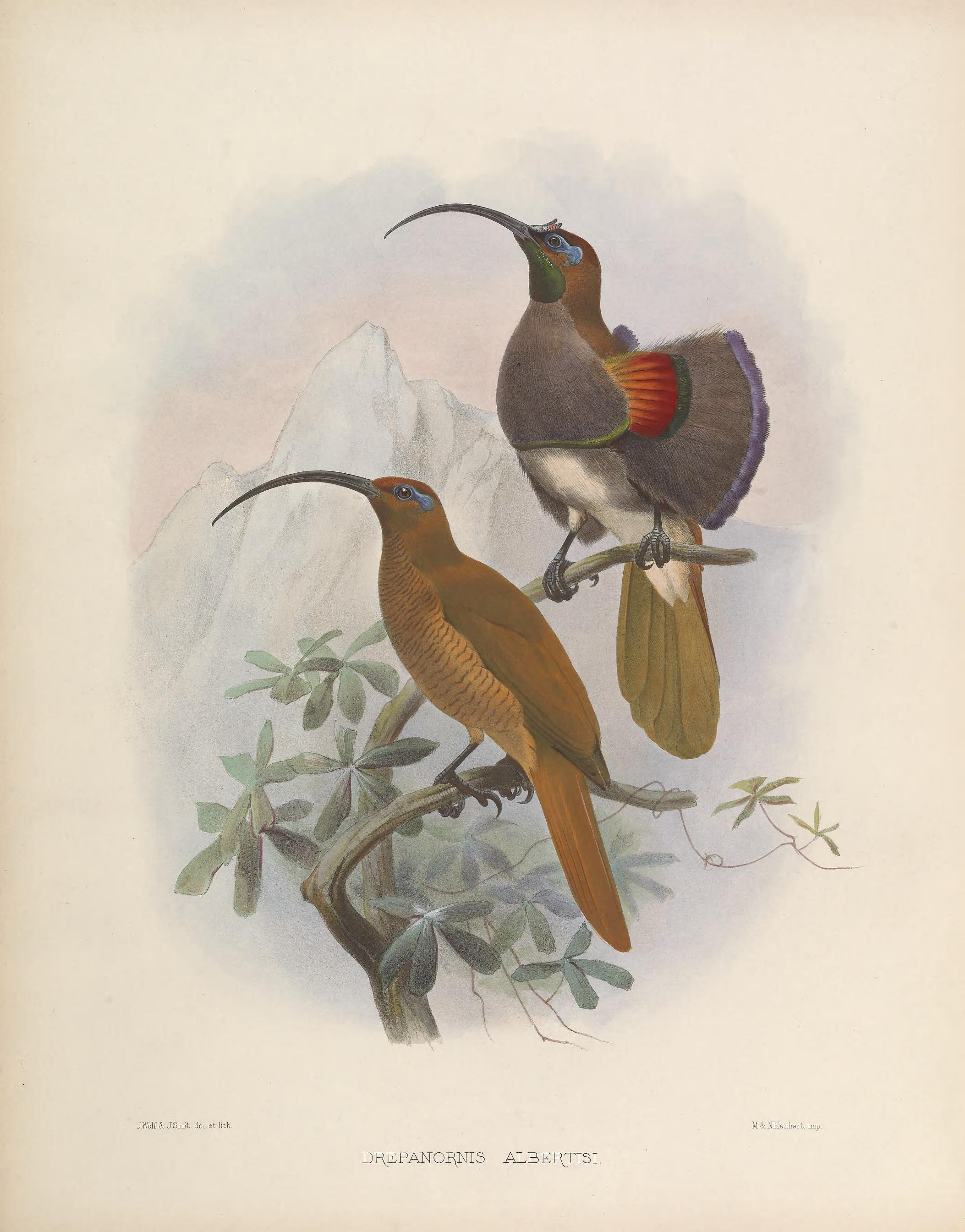
- Illustration of male (above) and female (below)
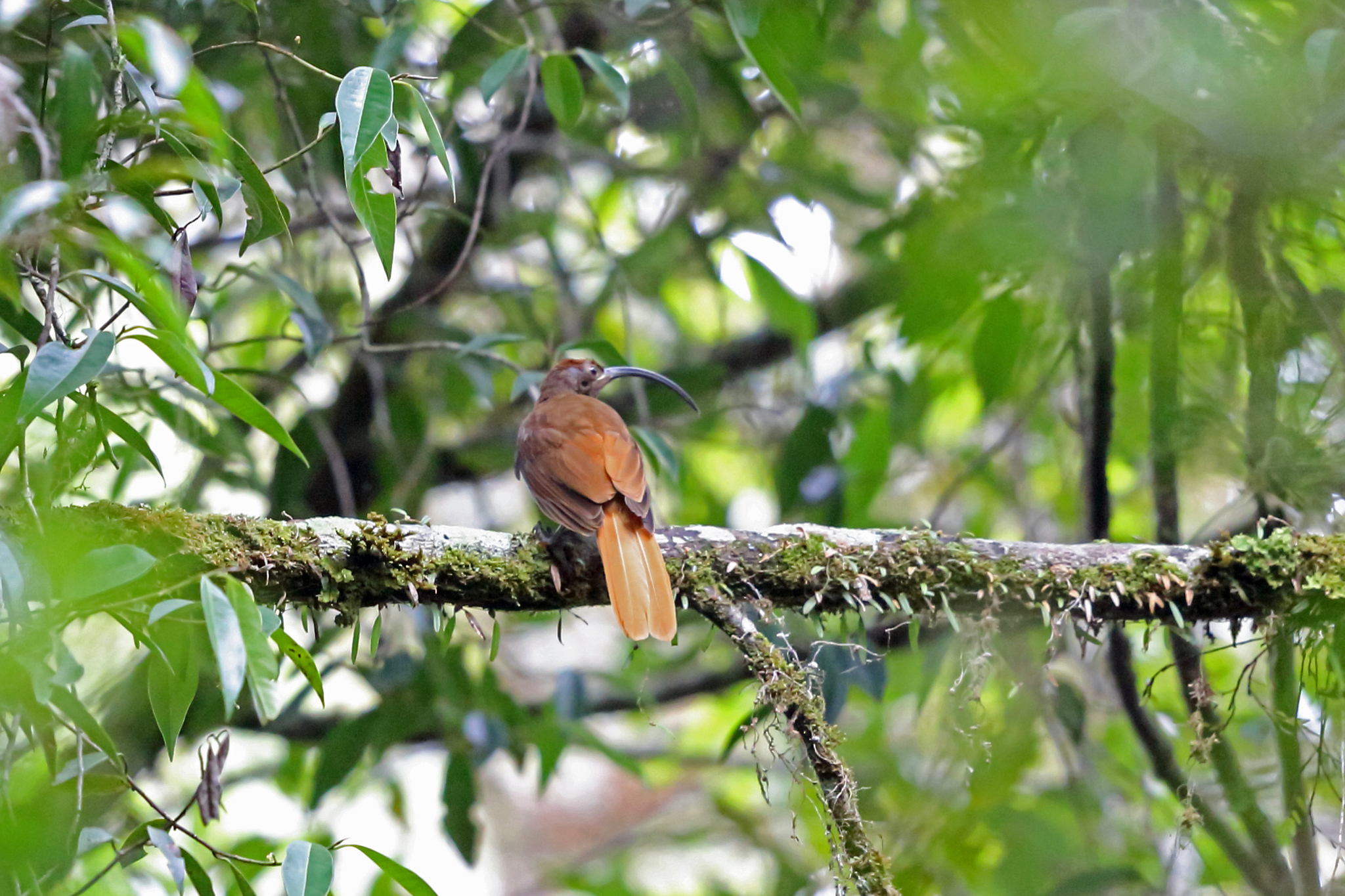

Conservation status
- Least Concern (IUCN 3.1)

Scientific classification
- Kingdom: Animalia
- Phylum: Chordata
- Class: Aves
- Order: Passeriformes
- Family: Paradisaeidae
- Genus: Drepanornis
- Species: D. albertisi

Binomial name
- Drepanornis albertisi (Sclater, PL, 1873)

Synonyms
- Epimachus albertisi

= Black-billed sicklebill =

Species of bird

The black-billed sicklebill (Drepanornis albertisi), also referred to as the buff-tailed sicklebill (resulting in common confusion with the hummingbird of the same name), is a species of bird-of-paradise. It, along with its congener, are the only members of the genus Drepanornis.

== Conservation status ==
Widespread throughout its large range, the black-billed sicklebill is evaluated as being of least concern on the IUCN Red List of Threatened Species. It is listed on Appendix II of CITES.

== Etymology ==
The generic name Drepanornis consists of the words Drepane for "sickle" and ornis for "bird", so the genus name literally means "sickle bird", referring to their sickle-shaped bill; the specific name commemorates the Italian naturalist Luigi Maria d'Albertis, who discovered this species in 1872. The race cervinicauda's subspecific name consists of cervinus for "stag-colored" and "cauda" for tail, geisleri honors Bruno Geisler, a German ornithologist who described this subspecies, and inversus means "overturned".

== Subspecies and taxonomy ==
Though they share similar features and the same English name, the Drepanornis sicklebills are only distantly related to the Epimachus sicklebills. In fact, they are more closely allied with the twelve-wired and standardwing birds-of-paradise. There are two agreeable subspecies, though races geisleri from the Huon Peninsula and inversus from the Weyland Mountains and nearby highlands require more detail to be considered valid subspecies or not.

- Drepanornis albertisi albertisi (Sclater, 1873)
- Drepanornis albertisi cervinicauda (Sclater, 1884)

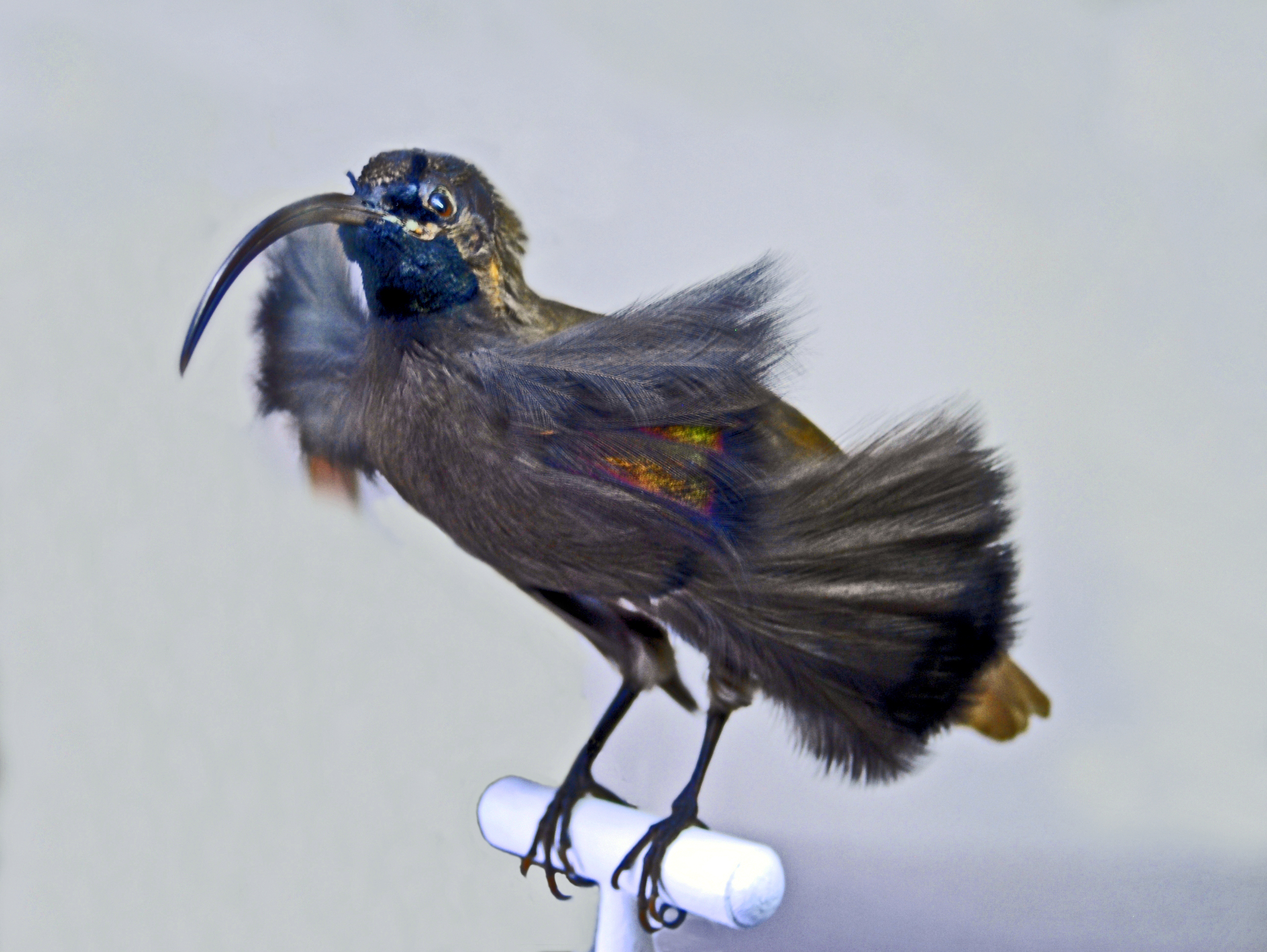
Drepanornis albertisi cervinicauda, museum specimen

== Description ==
The black-billed sicklebill is medium-sized, about 35 cm long, brown. The male has a bare maroon-grey skin around its eye, buff-colored tail, dark-brown iris, yellow mouth and black sickle-like bill. It is adorned with dark, horn-like forecrown feathers, an erectile fan-like bronze neck plumes and elongated purple-tipped flank plumes. The unadorned brown female is smaller, with bill longer than male and dark-barred below.

== Biology ==
Its diet consists mainly of fruit and arthropods. The female lays one to two pale cream eggs with brown and grey spots.

== Distribution ==
The black-billed sicklebill is found in mountainous areas with a scattered range of presence across western, central and eastern New Guinea. The species is mostly distributed in tropical montane forests at altitudes of 1100 to 1900 m above sea level. It overlaps with Drepanornis brujini only barely, but no hybridization has ever been recorded, though it is possible to occur.

== Gallery ==
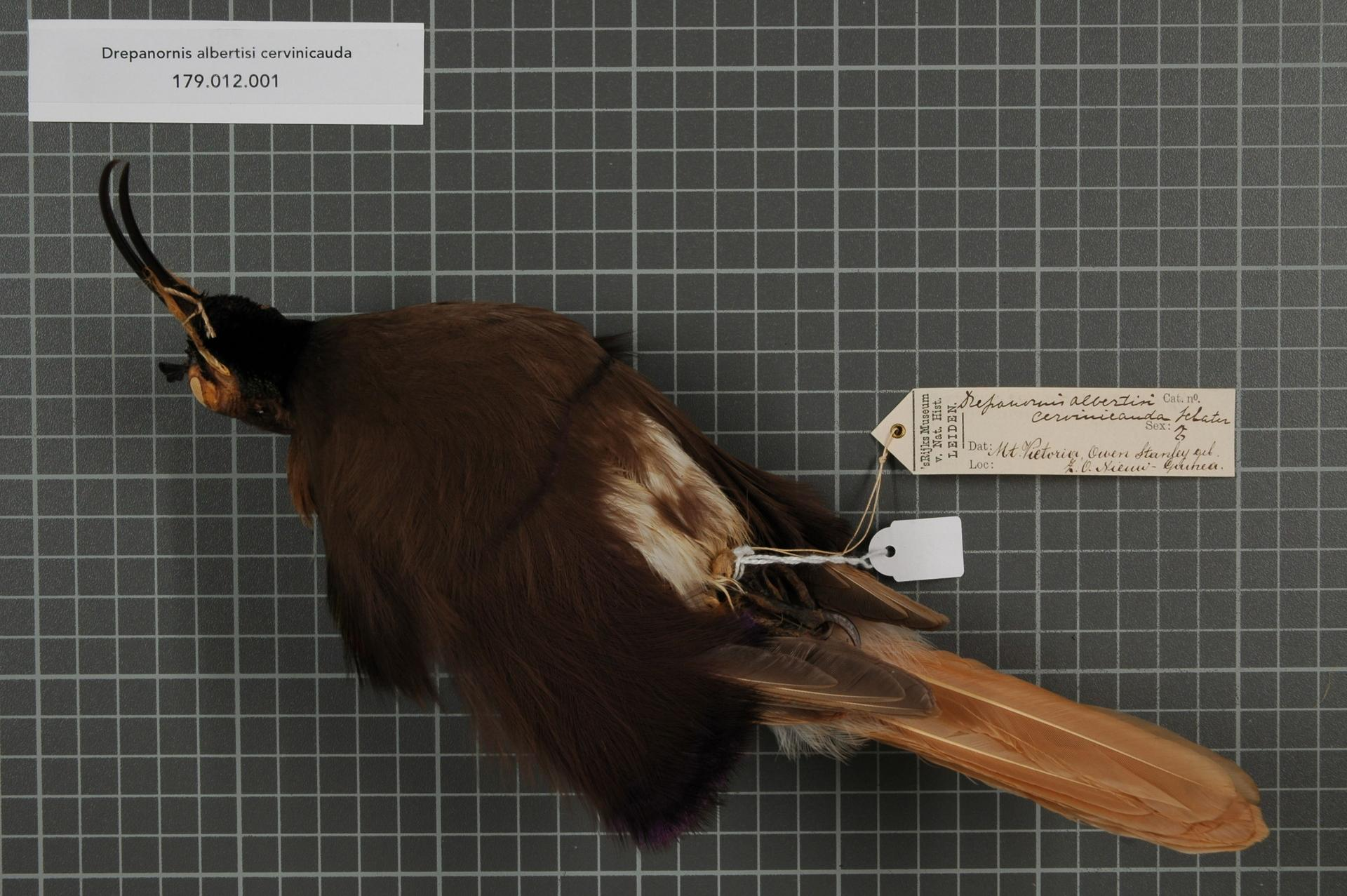
Race cervinicauda male specimen at the Naturalis Biodiversity Center.

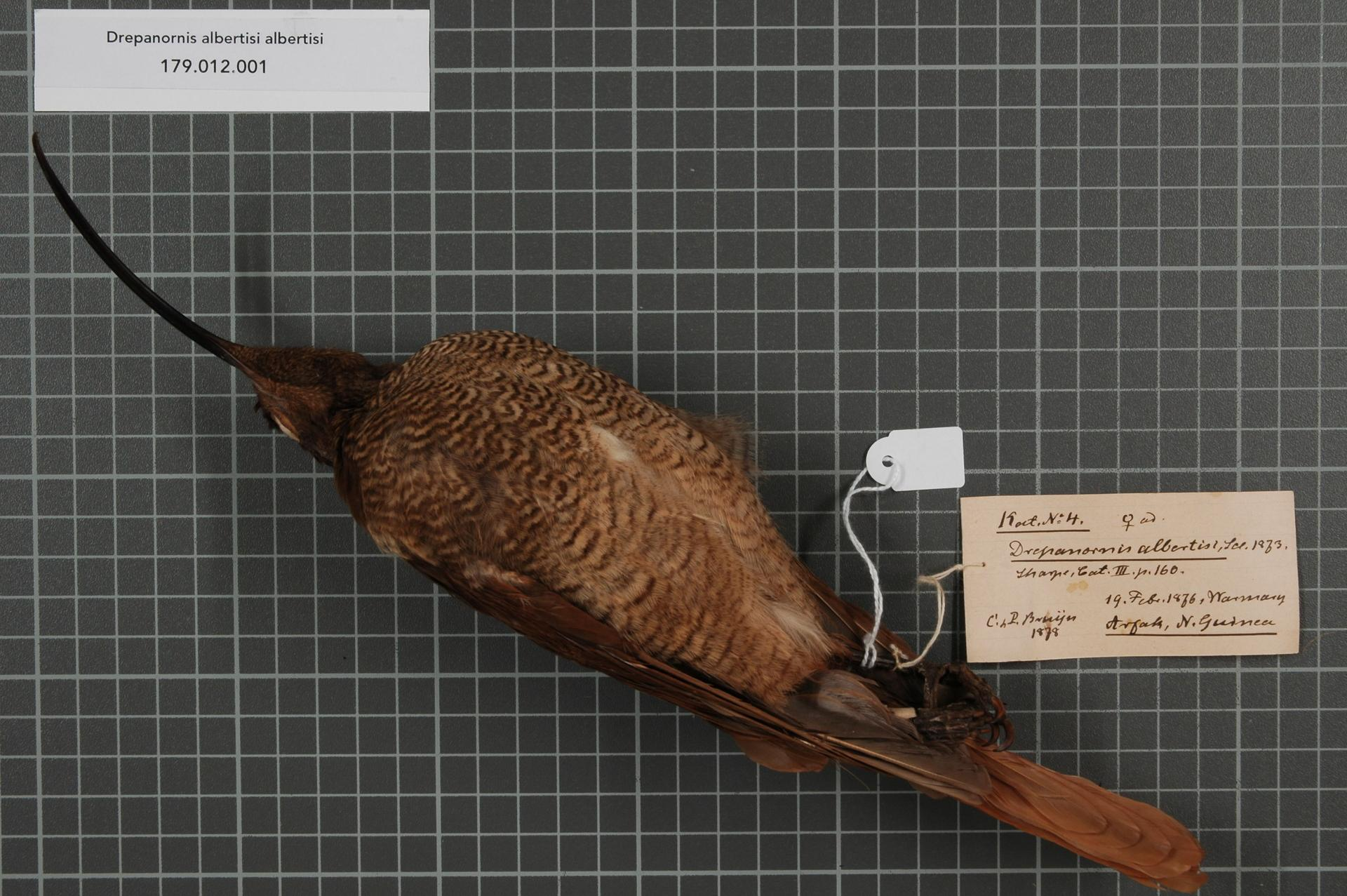
Nominate female specimen.

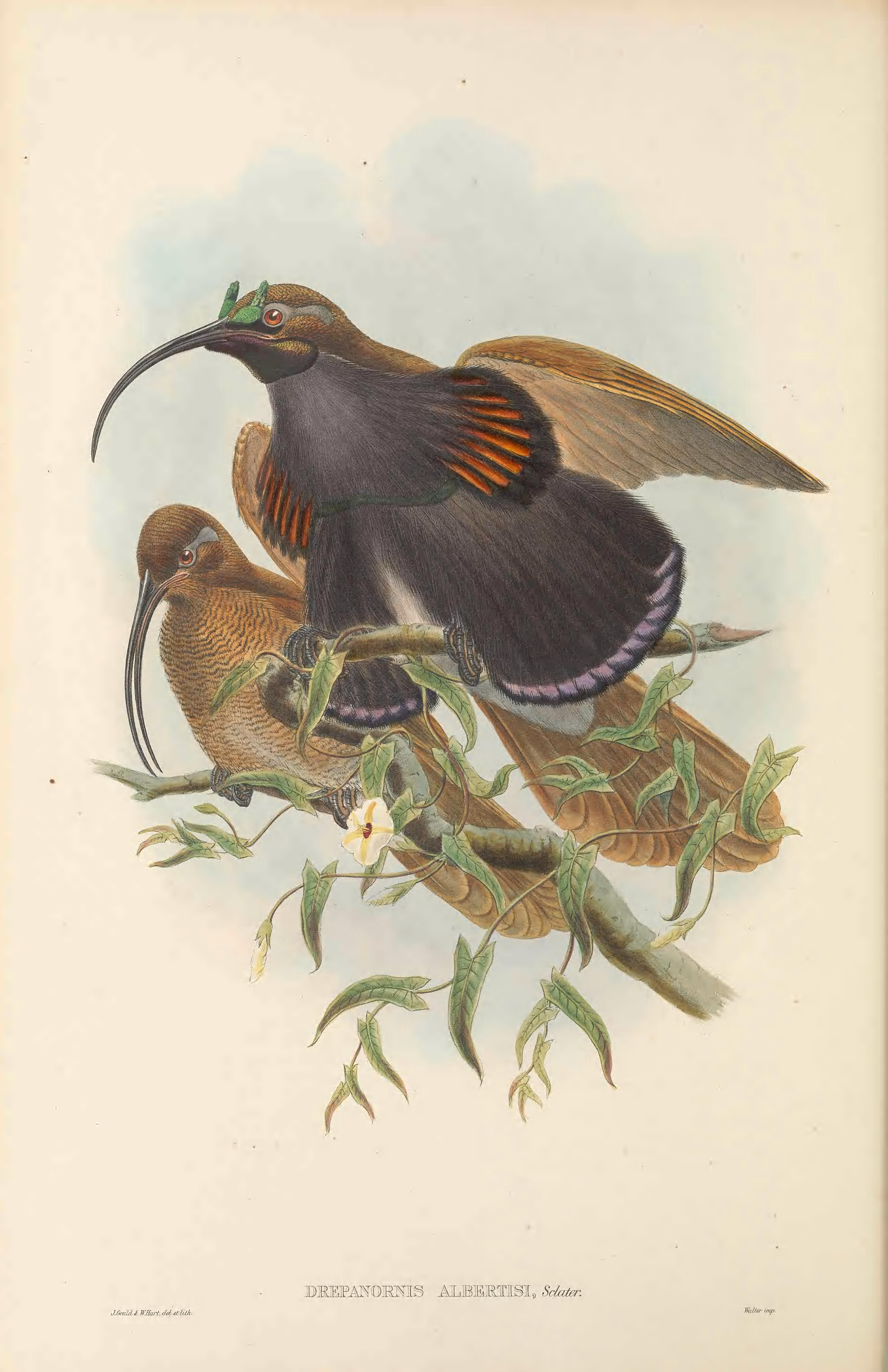
Early preconception of Drepanornis albertisi. Male front, female to the left.

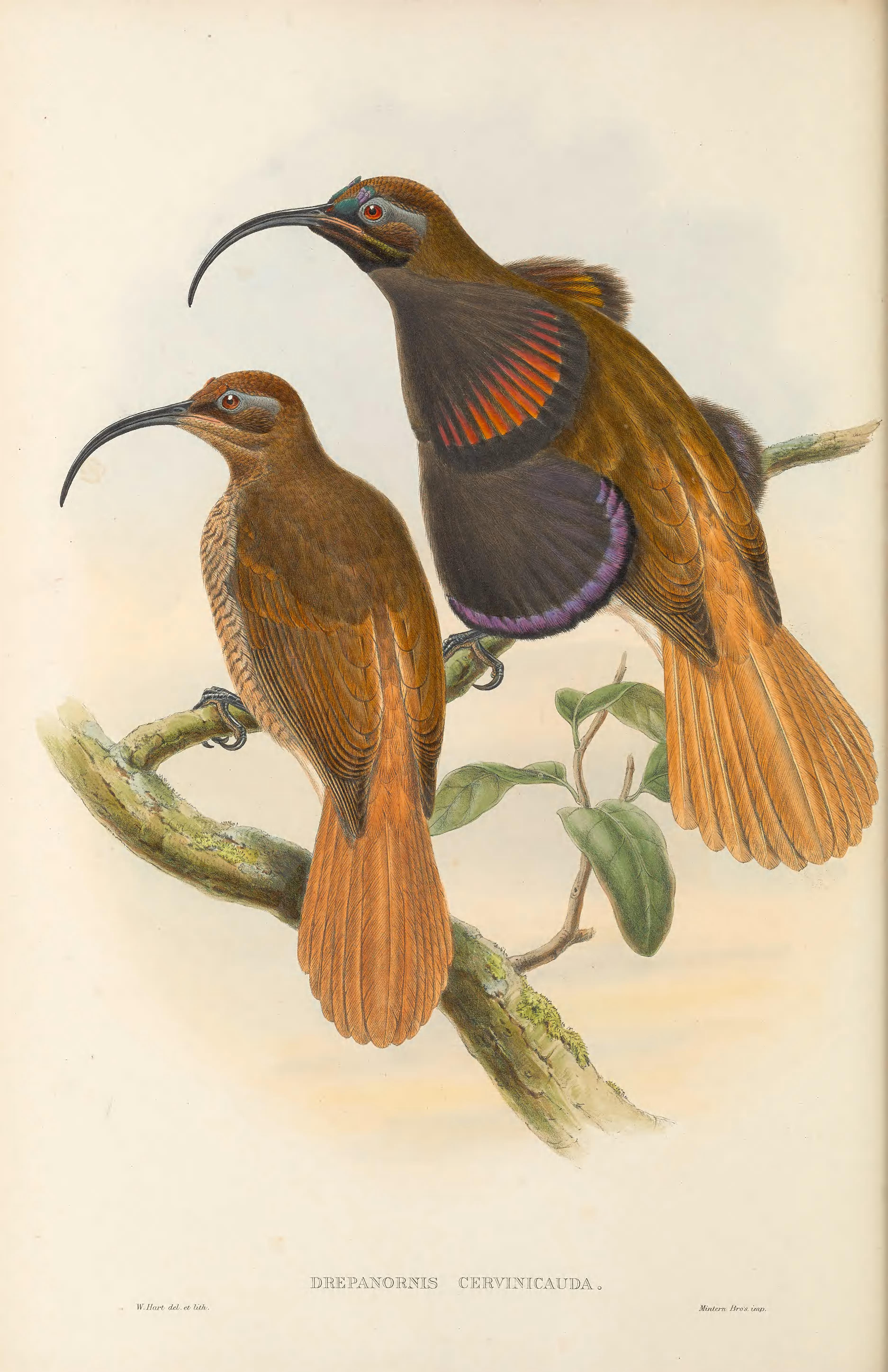
Another early illustration of Drepanornis albertisi.

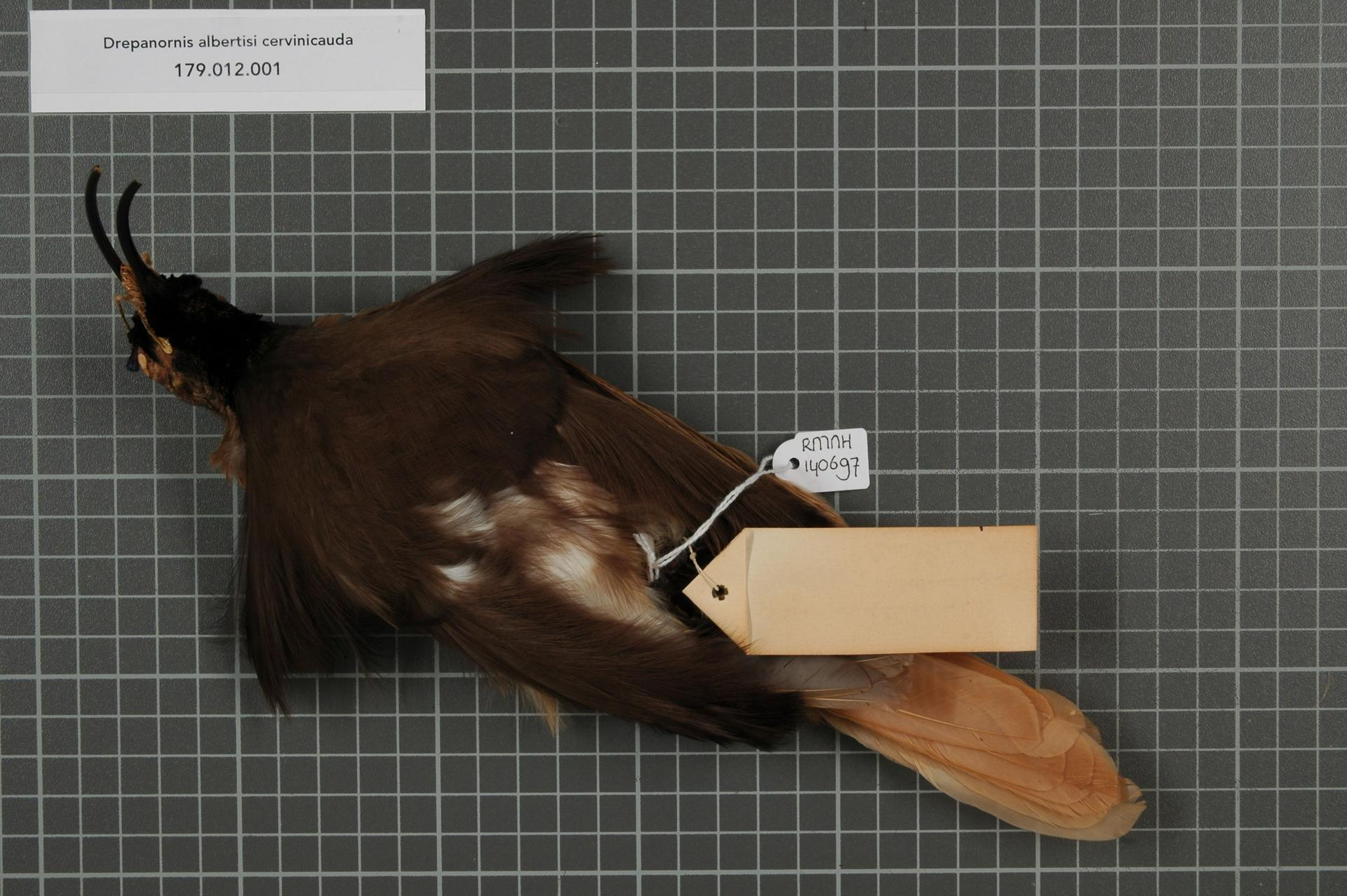
Race cervinicauda male specimen with upper pectoral feathers partially expanded.
