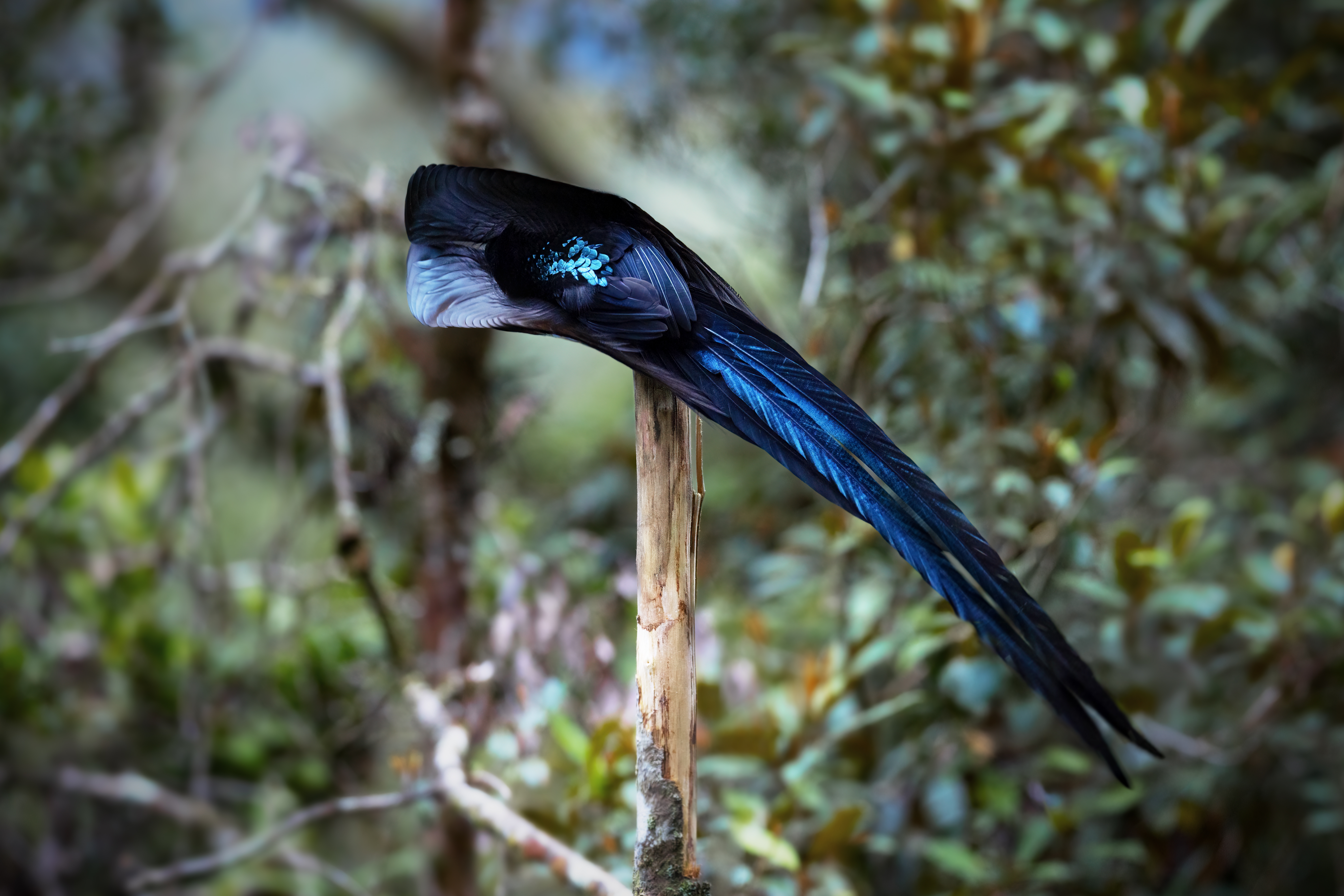
- A male displaying
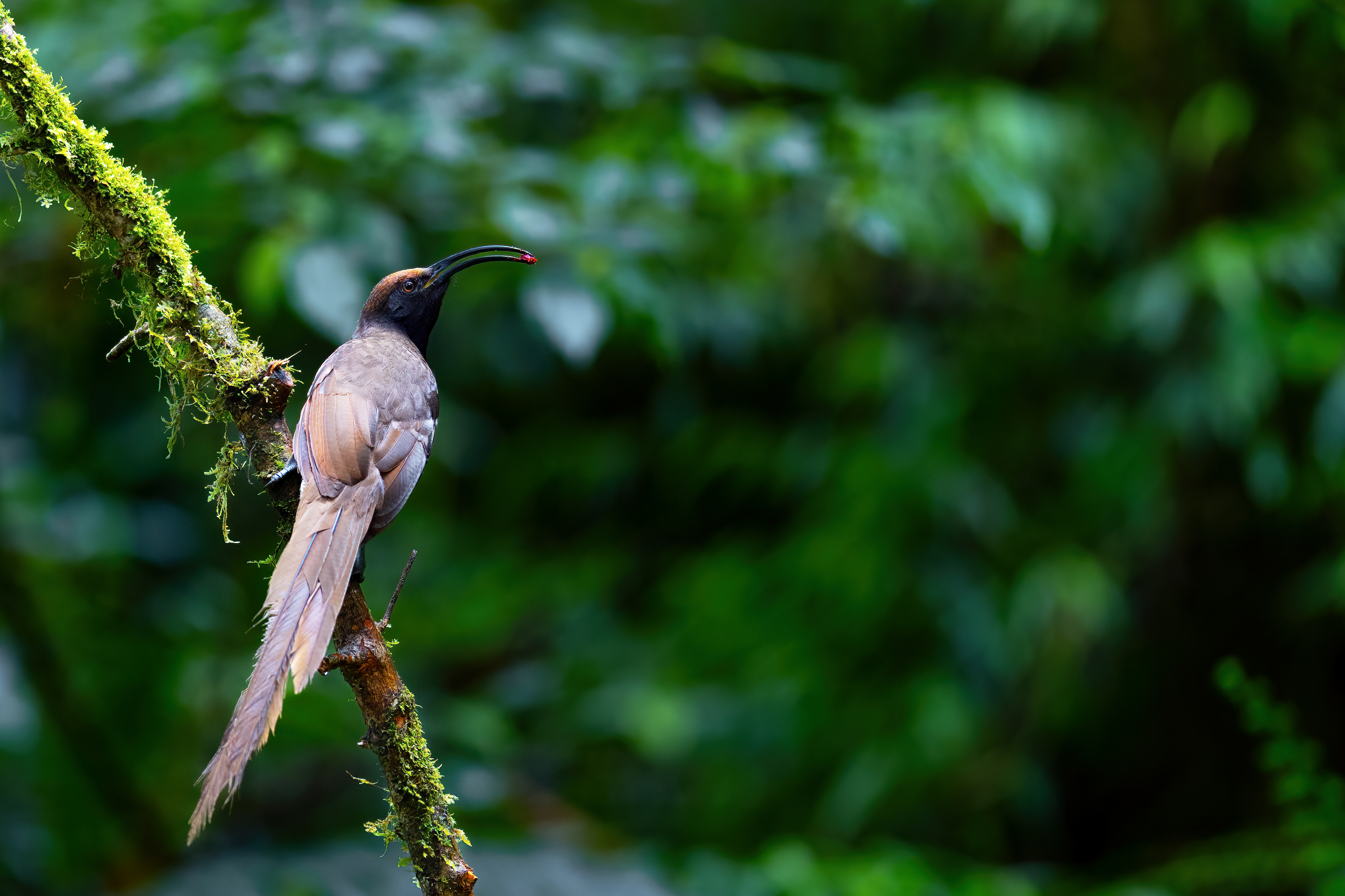
- female

Conservation status
- Least Concern (IUCN 3.1)

Scientific classification
- Kingdom: Animalia
- Phylum: Chordata
- Class: Aves
- Order: Passeriformes
- Family: Paradisaeidae
- Genus: Epimachus
- Species: E. fastosus

Binomial name
- Epimachus fastosus (Hermann, 1783)

= Black sicklebill =

Species of bird

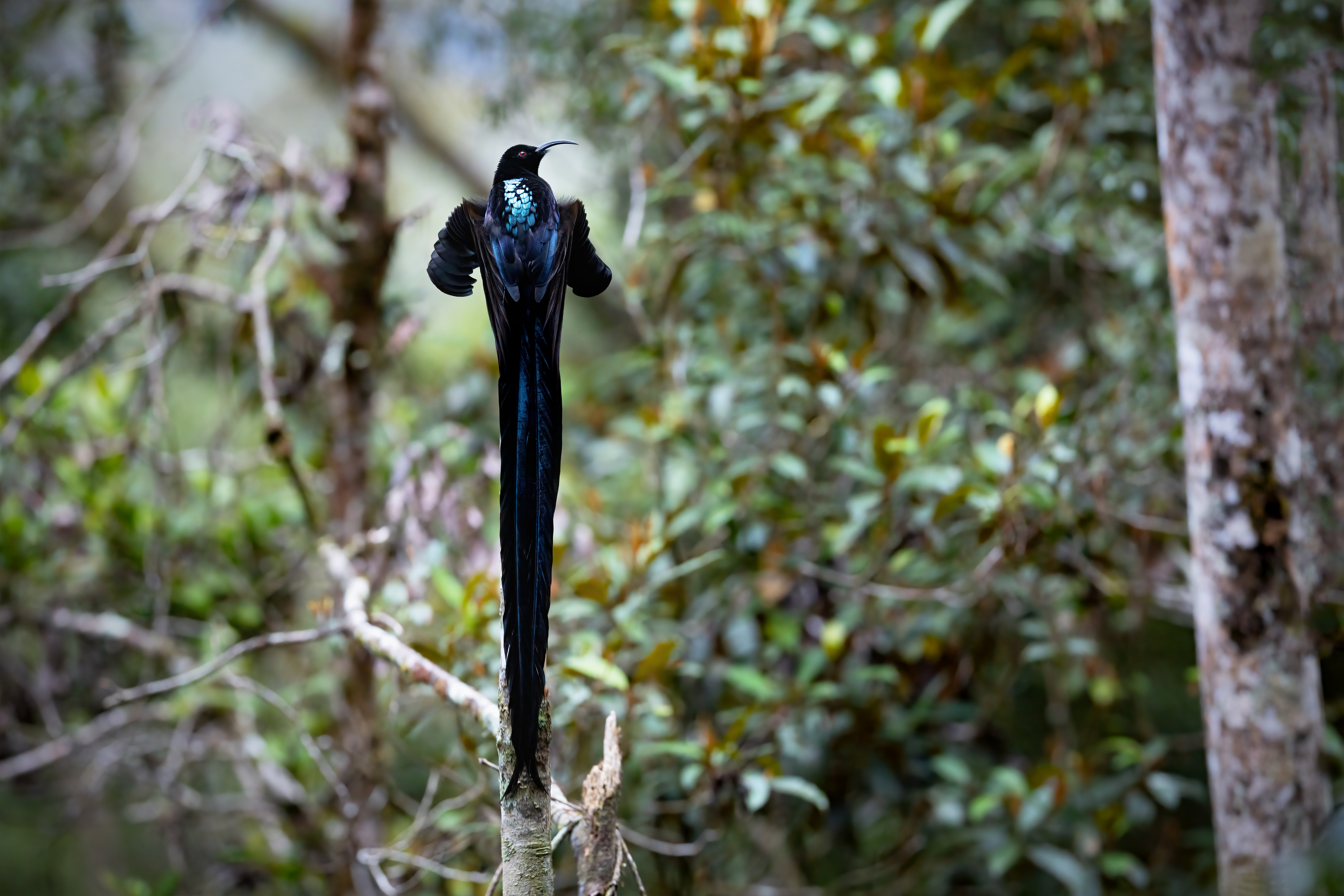
Black Sicklebill male

The black sicklebill (Epimachus fastosus) is a large member of the birds of paradise family, Paradisaeidae. This species is found throughout most of central New Guinea and the Vogelkop region to the northwest in montane forests at altitudes from 1,800 to 2,150 m (5,900 to 7,100 ft).

== Etymology ==
The species' scientific name is Epimachus fastosus. Epimachus, its generic name, means "equipped for battle", referring to this genus' machine gun-sounding calls. Its specific name, fastosus, means "proud". For its subspecies, atratus means "black", ultimus means "final" (probably referring to this subspecies as the last one discovered for this species), and stresemanni honors the German naturalist, Erwin Stresemann.

== Description ==
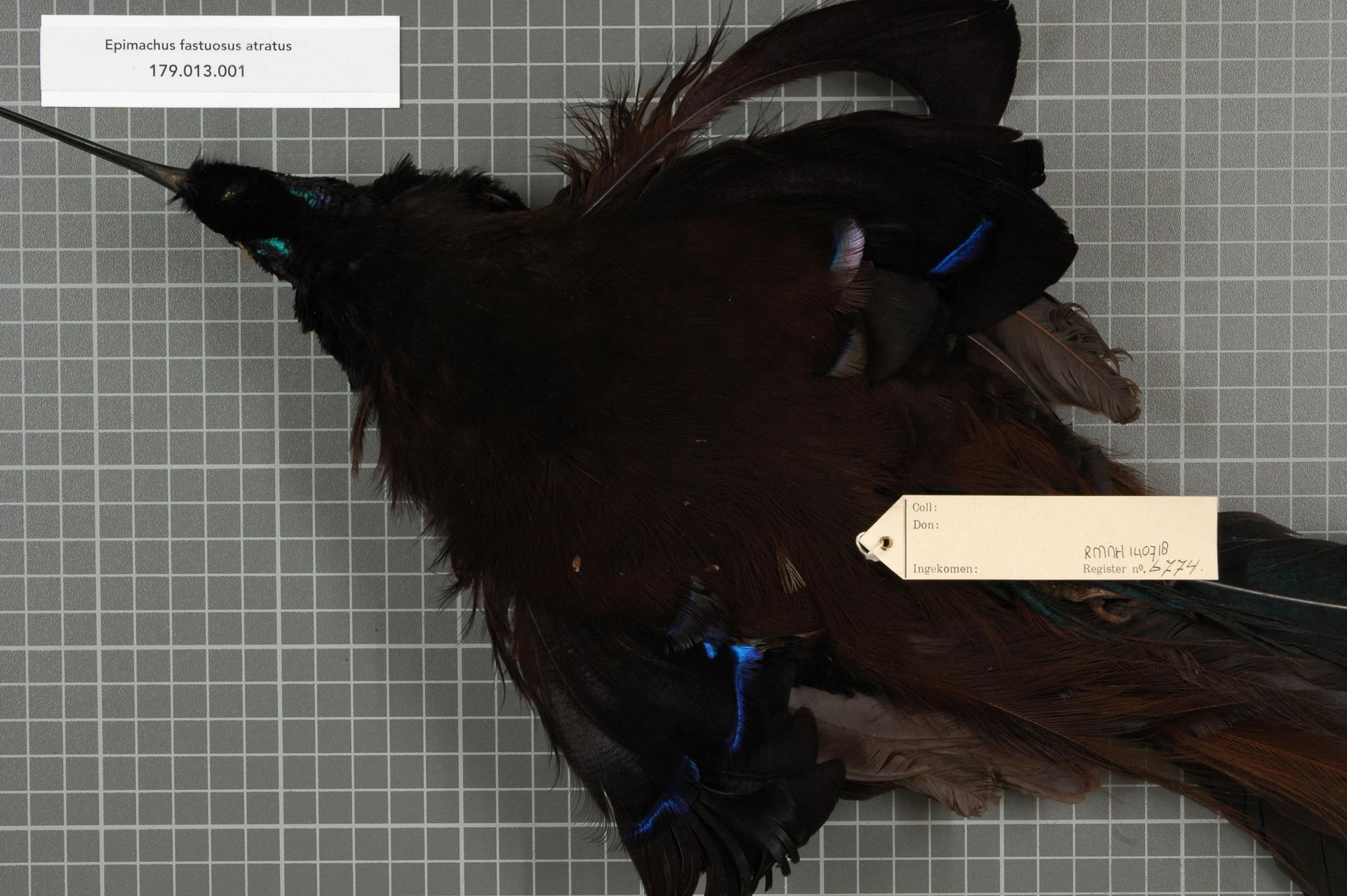
Male specimen of race atratus at the Naturalis Biodiversity Center.

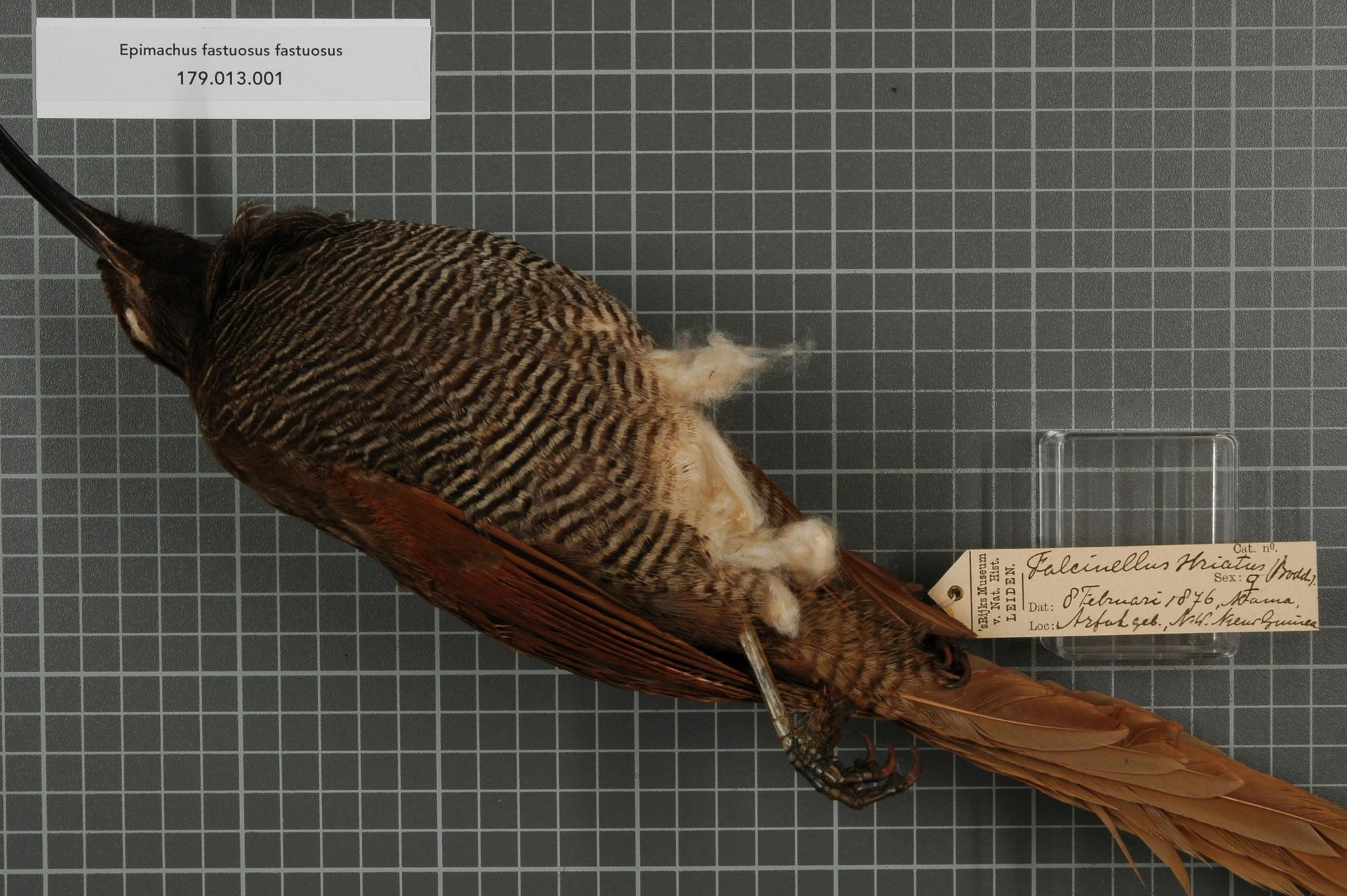
Nominate female specimen at the Naturalis Biodiversity Center.

As the second-longest bird of paradise species (behind the ribbon-tailed astrapia), the black sicklebill measures about 110 cm (43 in) in length if the tail is included, and around 24 in (61 cm) without the tail. The female is around 21 in (53 cm) in length. The black sicklebill is a very bizarre species of bird of paradise. The male has a black head with a long, silver, slightly downcurved bill (not as downcurved as Drepanornis sicklebills), a bright yellow mouth, and scarlet-red eyes which are surrounded by iridescent scaly feathers of typically blue-greenish color that cover most of the front of the face. The rest of the head, including the neck, is jet black. The back is jet black, but is mostly covered with iridescent scale-like feathers with metallic blue color, but can be concluded as greenish-blue in some lights. His wings are black with a less conspicuous bluish iridescence. The greatly exaggerated tail is jet black with a more visible blue iridescence, more notable at the center. On its underside, he has very soft, almost silky brownish-black plumage that ends in relatively elongated flank plumes that extend slightly past the tail, but these plumes are more pronounced in the brown sicklebill. Typically hidden when perched, the males' most splendid ornaments are two glorious pectoral fans on each side of the breast. These large feathers are almost entirely black, but an outstanding feature is that each feather is intricately tipped and iridescent blue-greenish. These fans are used in their courtship displays when they bring them up over their head to form an overall comet shape edged with a stroking narrow, blue line. The female, however, is generically unimpressive. She is an olive-light brown above with more of an orange-brown crown. She is creamy on the belly, which is covered with black barring. She still has a long tail, but not nearly as long as her male counterpart. She differs from the female brown sicklebill by her brown eyes vs. the white eyes of the latter species. The tail is a dull olive. Both sexes have grey-blackish legs and feet.

=== Call ===
Long-tailed sicklebills have very un-birdly calls. The male of this species produces a powerful, far-carrying, bubbling "kwit-it kwit-it", a characteristic sound in its range. The true unusual call is found in the brown sicklebill (see that species). Listen to the call here.

=== Hybridisation ===
In the wild, the bird has hybridised with Arfak astrapia to create offspring that were once considered two distinct species, Elliot's sicklebill (Epimachus ellioti) and the astrapian sicklebill (Astrapimachus astrapioides). Both species are generally viewed by most mainstream ornithologists as hybrids, but a minority of ornithologists believe ellioti may be a valid species. There have also been records of hybrids with the long-tailed paradigalla (Paradigalla carunculata), superb bird-of-paradise (Lophorina superba), and perhaps the crescent-caped lophorina (Lophorina niedda).

== Ecology and behaviour ==
=== Feeding ===
Black sicklebills, like many of their relatives, are primarily omnivorous, feeding on fruits, insects, and other animal prey. Unlike most mostly frugivorous cousins, it tends to feed on both items at an equal proportion. It typically feeds solitarily, but mixed foraging flocks are not abnormal.

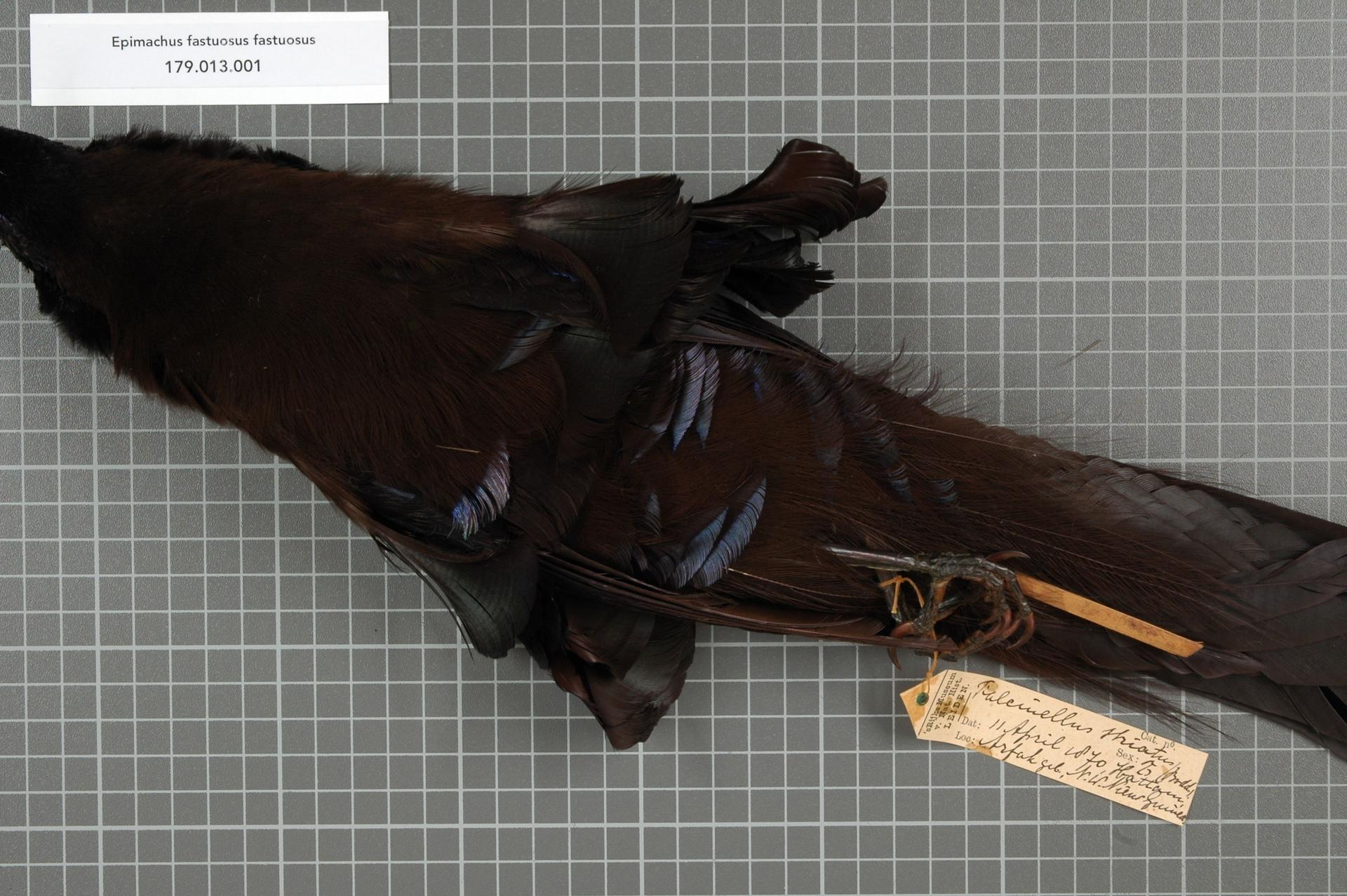
Nominate male specimen at the Naturalis Biodiversity Center. Note the pectoral fans, which are folded on this specimen.

=== Courtship and breeding ===
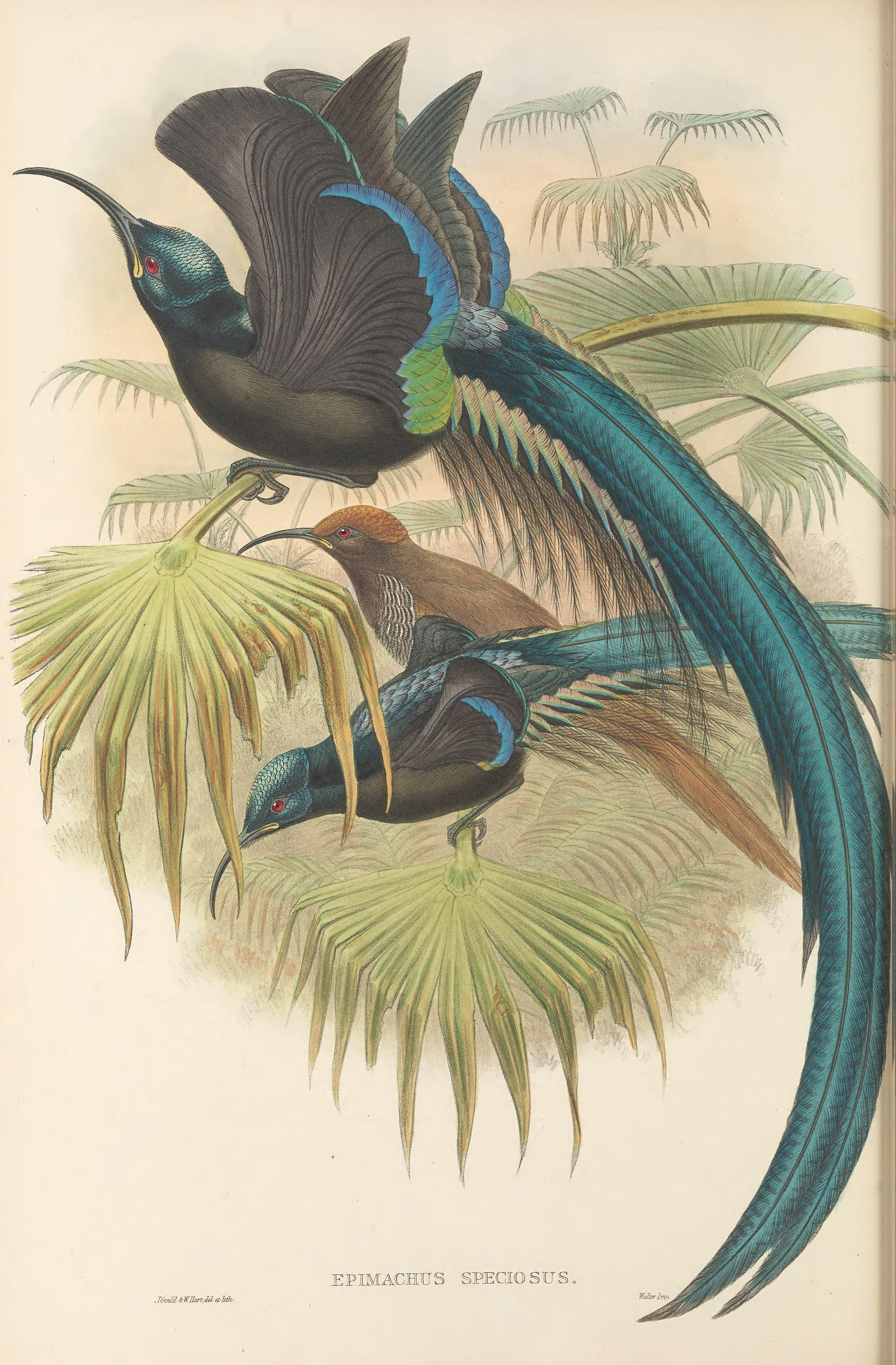
Illustration of male and female.

Male black sicklebills display anywhere from September to October and February to April. Like nearly all members in Paradisaeidae, they are polygynous, mating with several females in a single season. The male chooses a pole-like, upstanding branch for his display. He may practice for days on end; once he's ready to display, he advertises with his loud call to attract a female. When a female lands on his pole, he fluffs up his pectoral fans to make a comet shape, leaning and bending horizontally. After his intro, he rises upward and perpendicular to the ground and repeatedly rubs the rachides of his flight feathers together to make woodpecker-like beating sounds, all while slowly orbiting around the female's inquisitive face. Once she's been impressed, the two birds copulate. The female tends to all parental duties; she builds the nest and cares for the eggs and chicks. However, as custom with the family, very little is known about the actual breeding process of this species.

== Subspecies and taxonomy ==
The Black sicklebill has been classified as Promerops fastuosus, and was first thought to be a species of sugarbird (from the family Promeropidae) upon discovery; of course, this was proved false and it now sits in the family Paradiseidae. The "long-tailed" sicklebills are actually not closely related to the "short-tailed" birds of the same genus, Drepanornis; they in fact belong to a clade that includes the Paradigalla and Astrapia. Of course, its closest relative is the brown sicklebill (Epimachus meyeri). The black sicklebill has three subspecies:

- Epimachus fastosus atratus- the disputed subspecies stresemanni is synonymized with atratus.
- Epimachus fastosus fastosus
- Epimachus fastosus ultimus

== Status and conservation ==
With a population estimated at around 2,000-10,000 individual birds, the habitat Due to ongoing habitat loss, small population size, and hunting in some areas for food and its tail feathers, the black sicklebill is declining in a relatively relevant portion of its distribution. It is classified as Least Concern on the IUCN Red List of Threatened Species and is listed in Appendix II of CITES.
