= Sicklebill =

Sicklebill can refer to:

- Drepanornis, a genus of birds of paradise.
- Epimachus, a genus of birds of paradise.
- Eutoxeres, a genus of hummingbirds.
