= Papyrus Oxyrhynchus 239 =

Greek papyrus fragment

Papyrus Oxyrhynchus 239 (P. Oxy. 239 or P. Oxy. II 239) is a declaration on oath addressed to the "scribe of the Oxyrhynchite nome," written in Greek. It was discovered in Oxyrhynchus. The manuscript was written on papyrus in the form of a sheet. It is dated 19 September 66. Currently it is housed in the University of Pennsylvania Museum of Archaeology and Anthropology in Philadelphia, Pennsylvania.

== Description ==
The document is a declaration on oath by Epimachus stating that he had not raised any irregular contributions (λογεία) in the village of Psôbthis and that he would not do so in the future. The word "λογεία" refers to local contributions as opposed to regular taxes. The measurements of the fragment are 157 by 98 mm.

It was discovered by Grenfell and Hunt in 1897 in Oxyrhynchus. The text was published by Grenfell and Hunt in 1899.

== Text ==
To the scribe of the Oxyrhynchite nome from Epimachus, son of Pausiris, son of Ptolemaeus, whose mother is Heraclea, daughter of Epimachus, an inhabitant of the village of Psôbthis in the lower toparchy. I swear by Nero Claudius Caesar Augustus Germanicus Imperator that I have levied no contributions for any purpose whatever in the said village and that henceforward I shall not become headman of a village; otherwise let me be liable to the consequences of the oath.

== See also ==
- Oxyrhynchus Papyri
