= Ali Wallace =

Ali Wallace may refer to:

- Ali (Alexis) Wallace, a winner of Miss Oregon in 2015
- Ali Wallace (naturalist), a Malay naturalist who assisted Alfred Russel Wallace on his travels
