= Short-tailed paradigalla =

Conservation status
- Least Concern (IUCN 3.1)

Scientific classification
- Kingdom: Animalia
- Phylum: Chordata
- Class: Aves
- Order: Passeriformes
- Family: Paradisaeidae
- Genus: Paradigalla
- Species: P. brevicauda

Binomial name
- Paradigalla brevicauda Rothschild & Hartert, 1911

Species of bird

The short-tailed paradigalla (Paradigalla brevicauda) is a species of bird-of-paradise.

Formerly presumed to have been monogamous, it is now considered to breed polygynously. It inhabits the New Guinea Highlands forests. The diet consists mainly of fruits, seeds and insects.

The short-tailed paradigalla is evaluated as Least Concern on the IUCN Red List of Threatened Species. It is listed on Appendix II of CITES.

== Description ==
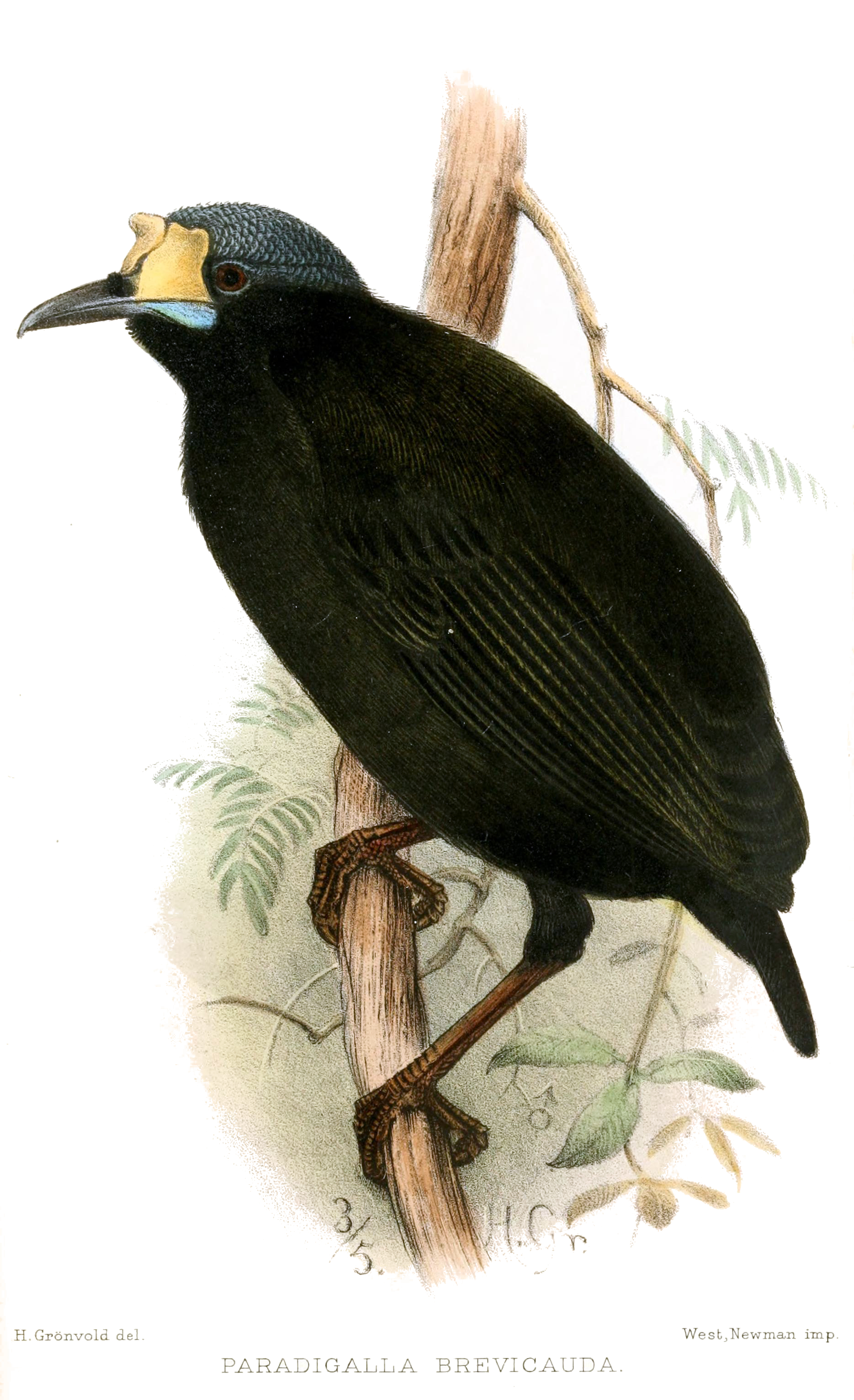
Illustration of a male

The short-tailed paradigalla is medium-sized, approximately 23 cm long, stocky black plumaged with slender black bill and bright yellow and blue wattles in front of each eye. The sexes are almost similar in appearance: the female is smaller than the male with a duller plumage and smaller wattles. The short-tailed paradigalla is distinguished from its nearest relative, the long-tailed paradigalla, by its smaller size, shorter tail feathers and lack of red on the wattles.
