= Carl Hunstein =

German ornithologist and plant collector

Carl Hunstein (1843 – March 13, 1888) was a German ornithologist and plant collector.

Hunstein was born in Homberg, Germany. He emigrated to America, then relocated to New Zealand. From 1885 until his death, he was employed by the German New Guinea Company.

He was a successful discoverer of new species of birds-of-paradise, such as the:

- Brown sicklebill (Epimachus meyeri Finsch), named in honor of Adolf Bernard Meyer.
- Stephanie's astrapia (Astrapia stephaniae Finsch & A.B. Meyer), named in honor of Princess Stéphanie of Belgium.
- Blue bird-of-paradise (Paradisaea rudolphi Finsch), named in honor of Crown Prince Rudolf of Austria.
- Emperor bird-of-paradise (Paradisaea guilielmi Cabanis).

Hunstein died when a tsunami, caused by a submarine volcano, hit the coast of New Britain of the Bismarck Archipelago.

He is commemorated in New Guinea by the Hunstein Mountains and the Hunstein Forest, and in plants and animals including the Hunstein's mannikin (Lonchura hunsteini), Cyathea hunsteiniana and Araucaria hunsteinii.

== See also ==
- Ritter Island
