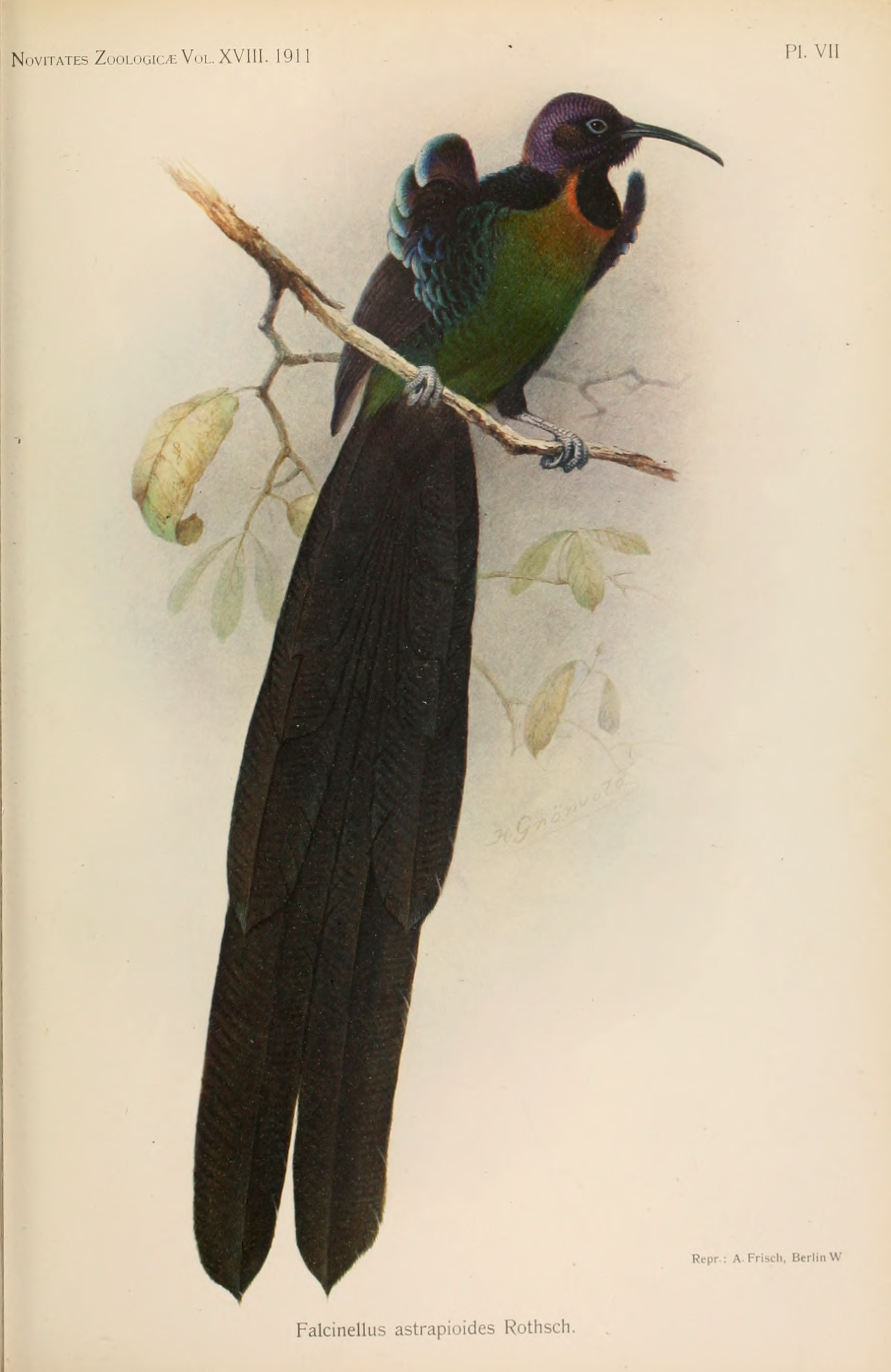

Scientific classification
- Kingdom: Animalia
- Phylum: Chordata
- Class: Aves
- Order: Passeriformes
- Superfamily: Corvoidea
- Family: Paradisaeidae
- Hybrid: Astrapia nigra × Epimachus fastosus

Synonyms
- Epimachus astrapioides Rothschild, 1897; Astrapimachus astrapioides

= Astrapian sicklebill =

Hybrid bird

The astrapian sicklebill, also known as the green-breasted riflebird, is a bird in the Paradisaeidae family that was proposed by Erwin Stresemann to be an intergeneric hybrid between an Arfak astrapia and black sicklebill, an identity since confirmed by DNA analysis.

== History ==
Only one adult male specimen of this hybrid is known, held by the American Museum of Natural History, and presumably deriving from the Vogelkop Peninsula of north-western New Guinea.
