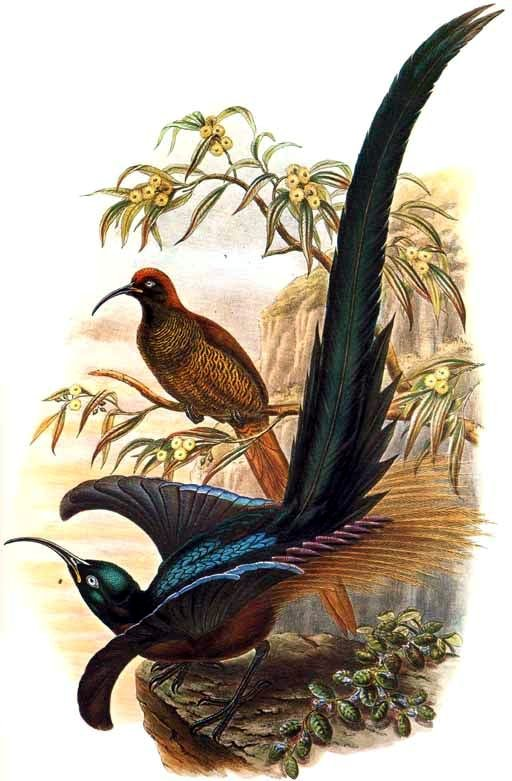

Conservation status
- Least Concern (IUCN 3.1)

Scientific classification
- Kingdom: Animalia
- Phylum: Chordata
- Class: Aves
- Order: Passeriformes
- Family: Paradisaeidae
- Genus: Epimachus
- Species: E. meyeri

Binomial name
- Epimachus meyeri Finsch & Meyer, 1886

= Brown sicklebill =

Species of bird

The brown sicklebill (Epimachus meyeri) is a species of bird-of-paradise that is found in the mountain forests of New Guinea.

Its appearance resembles the closely related and larger black sicklebill. In areas where these two large sicklebills met, the brown sicklebill replaced the latter species in higher altitudes. Its diet consists mainly of fruits, arthropods and small animals. The male has a staccato, burst-like call which resembles a burst of automatic gunfire.

The brown sicklebill is evaluated as Least Concern on the IUCN Red List of Threatened Species. It is listed on Appendix II of CITES.

== Taxonomy ==
A female specimen of the brown sicklebill was collected in New Guinea by the German collector Carl Hunstein in 1884. This specimen was formally described in 1886 by the German naturalists Otto Finsch and Adolf Bernhard Meyer under the current binomial name Epimachus meyeri. The genus name is from the Ancient Greek επιμαχος (epimakhos) meaning "equipped for battle" (from makhomai meaning "to fight"). The specific epithet meyeri is named after Meyer, one of the authors of the description. Although several subspecies have been described, these are no longer recognised and the brown sicklebill is considered to be monotypic.

== Description ==
The brown sicklebill is large, up to 96 cm long, dark blue and green with highly iridescent plumages, a sickle-shaped bill, pale blue iris and brown underparts. The male is adorned with ornamental plumes on the sides of its rear and a huge sabre-shaped central tail feathers that are highly prized by natives. The female is a reddish-brown bird with buff barred black below.

== Gallery ==
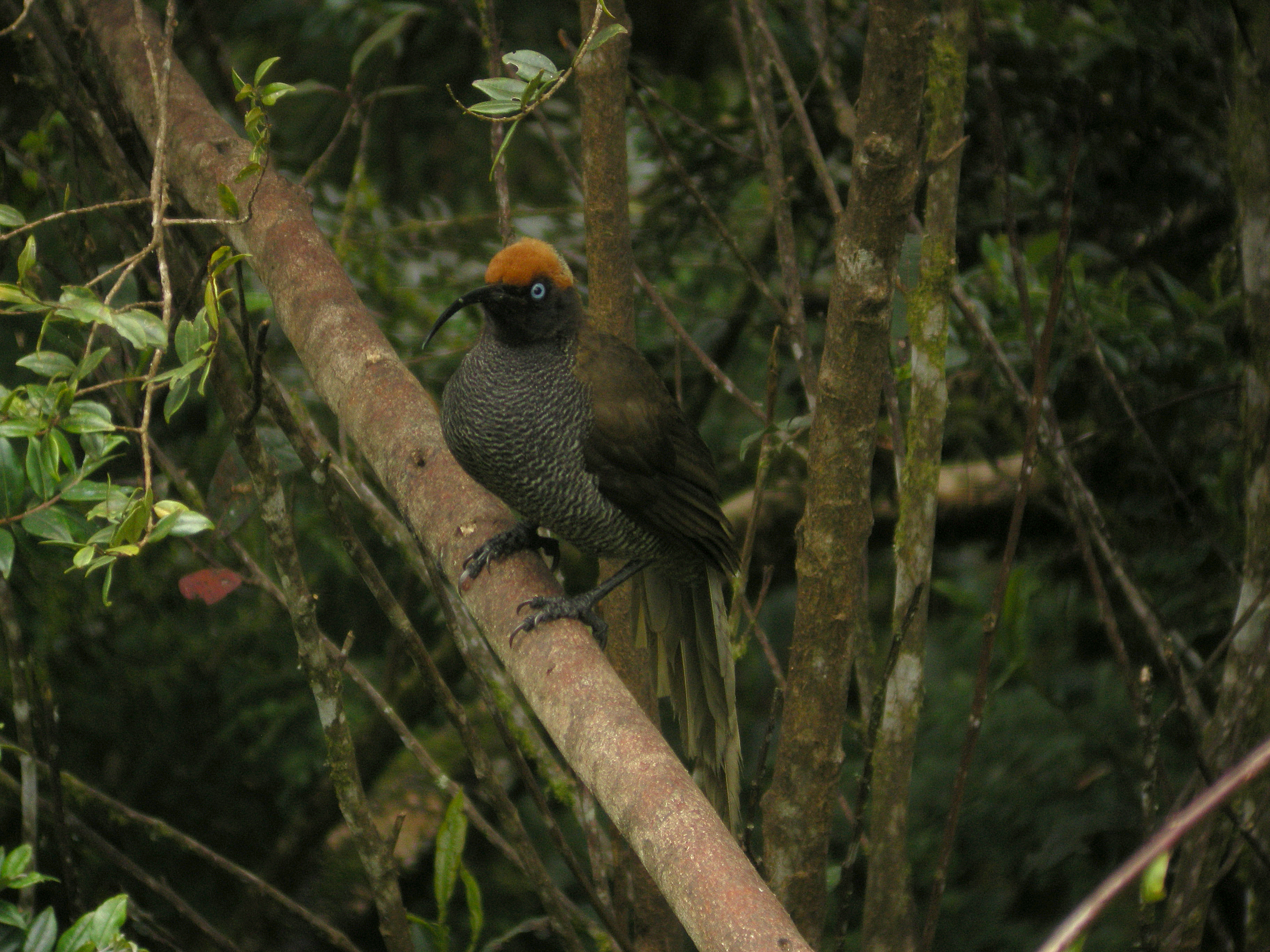
Female

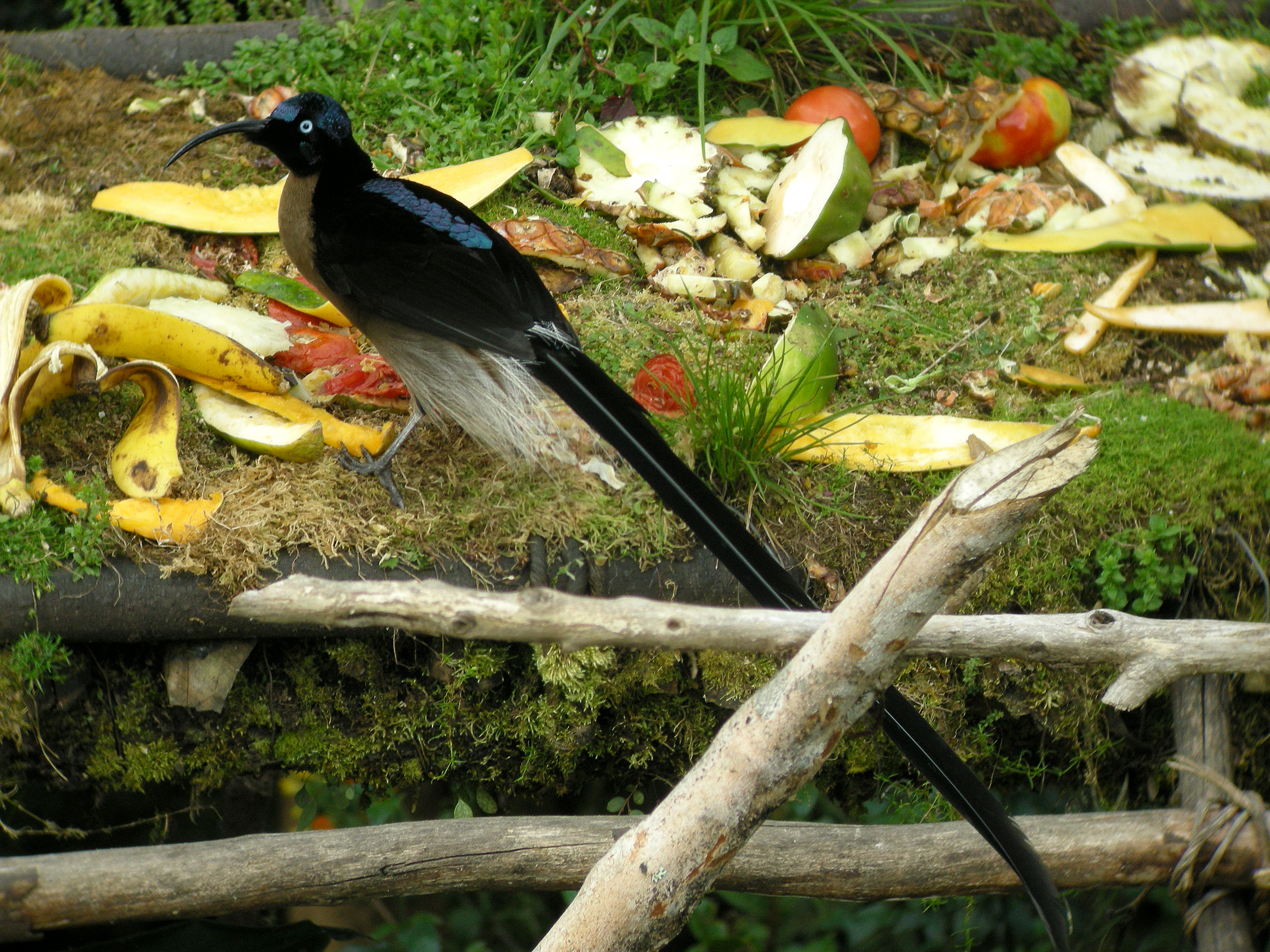
Male
