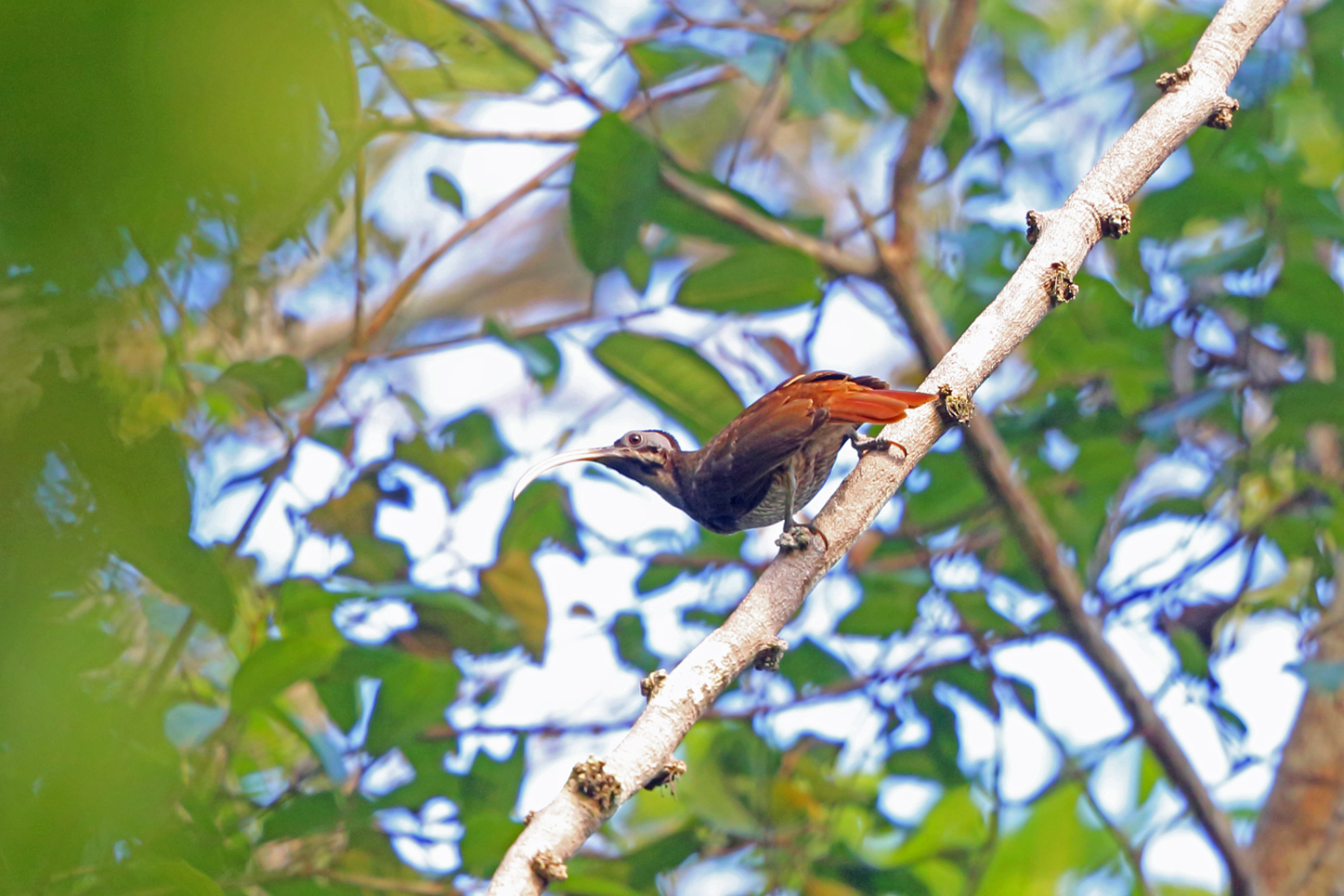

Conservation status
- Least Concern (IUCN 3.1)

Scientific classification
- Kingdom: Animalia
- Phylum: Chordata
- Class: Aves
- Order: Passeriformes
- Family: Paradisaeidae
- Genus: Drepanornis
- Species: D. bruijnii

Binomial name
- Drepanornis bruijnii Oustalet, 1879

Synonyms
- Epimachus bruijnii

= Pale-billed sicklebill =

Species of bird

The pale-billed sicklebill (Drepanornis bruijnii) is a species of sicklebill that belongs to the family Paradisaeidae, which contains the birds-of-paradise.

== Etymology ==
The scientific nomenclature, or name, of this species is Drepanornis bruijni, consisting of "Drepanornis", which means "sickle bird", that refers to the birds' sickle-shaped bill, and bruijni, which commemorates Antonie Augustus Bruijn, a Dutch plume merchant.

== Description ==
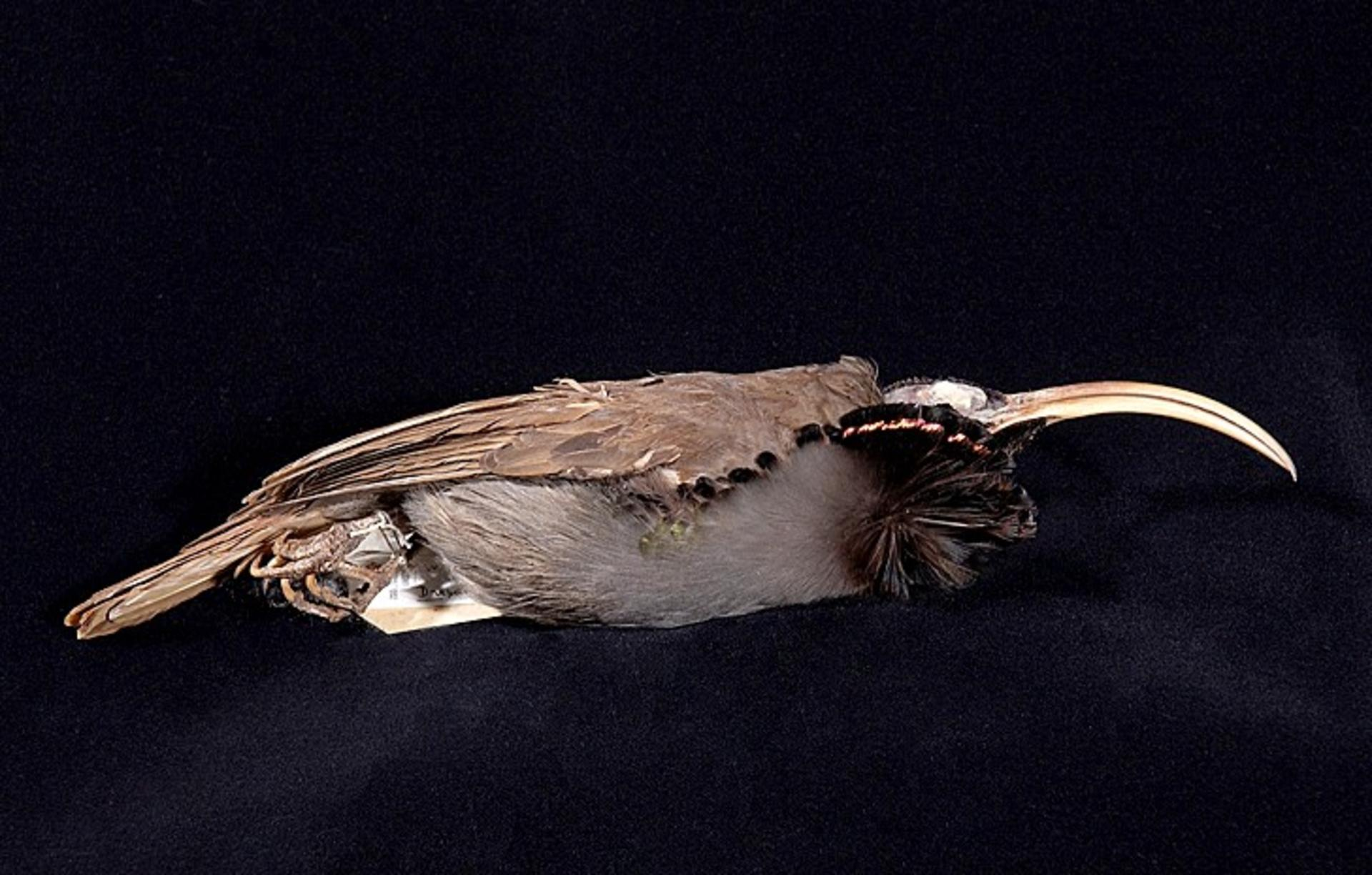
Male specimen at the Naturalis Biodiversity Center.

Pale-billed sicklebills are on the more medium-sized side of the family Paradisaeidae; they seldom reach over 35 cm, or 13.7 inches, in length. They are among the least attractive birds-of-paradise, being a dull brownish-olive on their upperside, with a greyish-brown underside. Their heads are dark brown, and one of their most noticeable features are lead-grey bare facial patches surrounding each eye and covering most of the head; there are also two iridescent tufts rising above the head. Unlike their congener's bill, they have a pale, ivory-ish colored, downcurved bill. The ornaments present on the male are relatively extensive pectoral feathers in rows on the sides of the breast and belly. The pectoral feathers highest on the breast (on each side) are dark greyish with coppery red to reddish iridescent tips; the rest of the pectoral plumes on the sides have more of a greenish-copper iridescence to their tips.

The female of this species is, for the most part, similar to the male. She has no iridescent feathers, and is of lighter weight than the male. She does have the bare facial patches like the male, but not as extensive. Instead of a greyish underside, she is barred below, starting from her chin to her rump. Her wings and lower neck are also a lighter dull brownish-olive. Both sexes have a rufous to buff-colored tail, purplish-lead grey legs and feet, and dark brown irises.

The call of the pale-billed sicklebill consists of musical whistling and some high pitched notes.

== Behaviour and ecology ==
The pale-billed sicklebill is distributed to lowland rainforests of northern and northwestern New Guinea. Its diet consists mainly of fruits and arthropods.

Due to deforestation and habitat lost on this limited range species, the pale-billed sicklebill is evaluated as Least Concern on the IUCN Red List of Threatened Species. It is listed on Appendix II of CITES.
