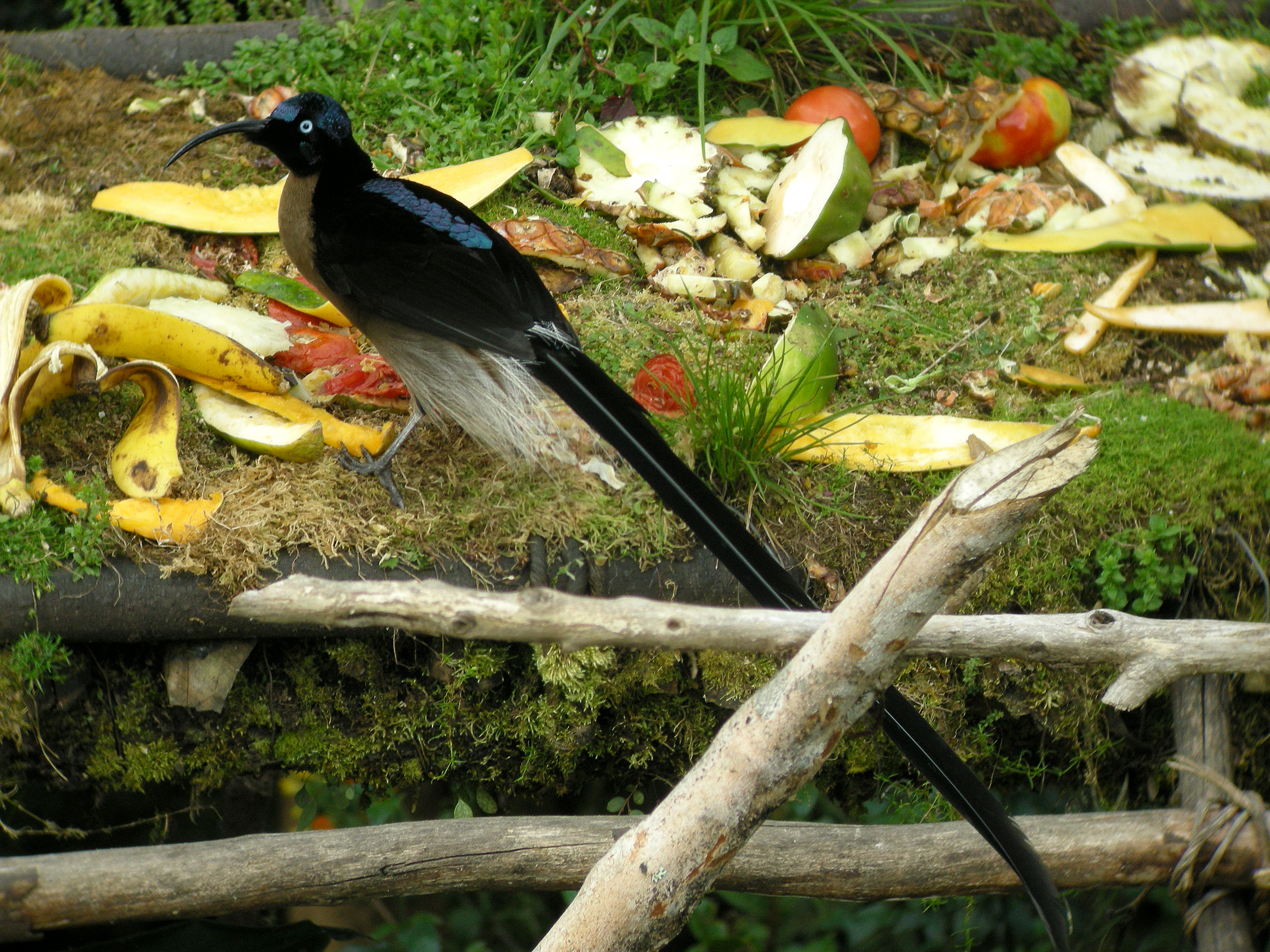
- Brown sicklebill, Epimachus meyeri

Scientific classification
- Kingdom: Animalia
- Phylum: Chordata
- Class: Aves
- Order: Passeriformes
- Family: Paradisaeidae
- Genus: Epimachus; Cuvier, 1816

Type species
- Upupa magna = Promerops fastuosus Gmelin, 1788

= Epimachus =

Genus of birds

Epimachus is a genus of birds-of-paradise (Paradisaeidae) that includes two species, found in the highland forests of New Guinea. They are the largest members of the family. The common name "sicklebill" refers to their long, decurved, sickle-shaped bill.

Sicklebills often associate with astrapias, which are superficially similar but have a short, straight bill and blunt-tipped tail, and the male's wings hiss in flight.

The species in the genus Epimachus are often referred to as "long-tailed" sicklebills, when describing them collectively as a genus. The other sicklebills, genus Drepanornis, are referred to as the "short-tailed" sicklebills. Ironically, the two genera are not closely related. There may also be confusion with the birds of the same name that belong to the hummingbird family, found in the Americas.

== Taxonomy ==
The genus Epimachus was introduced in 1816 by the French naturalist Georges Cuvier for the black sicklebill. The genus name is from the Ancient Greek επιμαχος (epimakhos) meaning "equipped for battle" (from makhomai "to fight").

In 1972, the genus was merged with the genus Drepanornis, but separated again in 1998. A phylogenetic study placed Epimachus in a clade that includes Paradigalla and Astrapia, implying that the long, curved bill has been acquired independently in Epimachus. According to the same study, the Drepanornis species are closely related to the Twelve-wired bird-of-paradise, Standardwing bird-of-paradise, superb birds-of-paradise, and the riflebirds.

The two species of Drepanornis as well as the two species of Epimachus separated about 10 and 7 mya, respectively. While the two species of Drepanornis occupy different elevations in low- and mid-montane forests, the two species of Epimachus are altitudinal replacements in mountain forests; these two cases could represent old cases of altitudinal speciation.

=== Species ===
Image	Common name	Scientific name	Distribution
	Black sicklebill	Epimachus fastosus	Found in the Vogelkop region, Wandammen Peninsula, and central New Guinea at elevations of 1500–2000 m.
	Brown sicklebill	Epimachus meyeri	Found across central New Guinea to the Bird's Tail region (Papuan Peninsula) to the southeast at elevations from 2000 to 3000 m.

== Description ==
Both species of Epimachus are sexually dimorphic. The males of these birds are highly eccentric, with hyperbolically long, saber-like, black tails that reach around 18 inches (46 cm) alone. They also feature two pectoral fan-like plumes on each side of the breast, which they bring up over their heads during their displays.

There is extensive green/purple iridescent highlights found on the head and back of the adult male; additionally, blue gloss is present on the tail. The females of both species both have barred underparts, olive-brown upperparts and relatively long tails, though not as extensive as the males' tails.

== Distribution and habitat ==
Sicklebills are endemic to New Guinea, sympathetically inhabiting areas of montane rainforest and cloud forest along the central mountainous axis of the island.

Brown sicklebills are more common, inhabiting mid and upper-mountain forests, including mossy cloud forest, above the elevations of other sicklebills. Black sicklebills are more rare and inhabit the transition from mid-mountain to cloud forest, occasionally forest edges.
