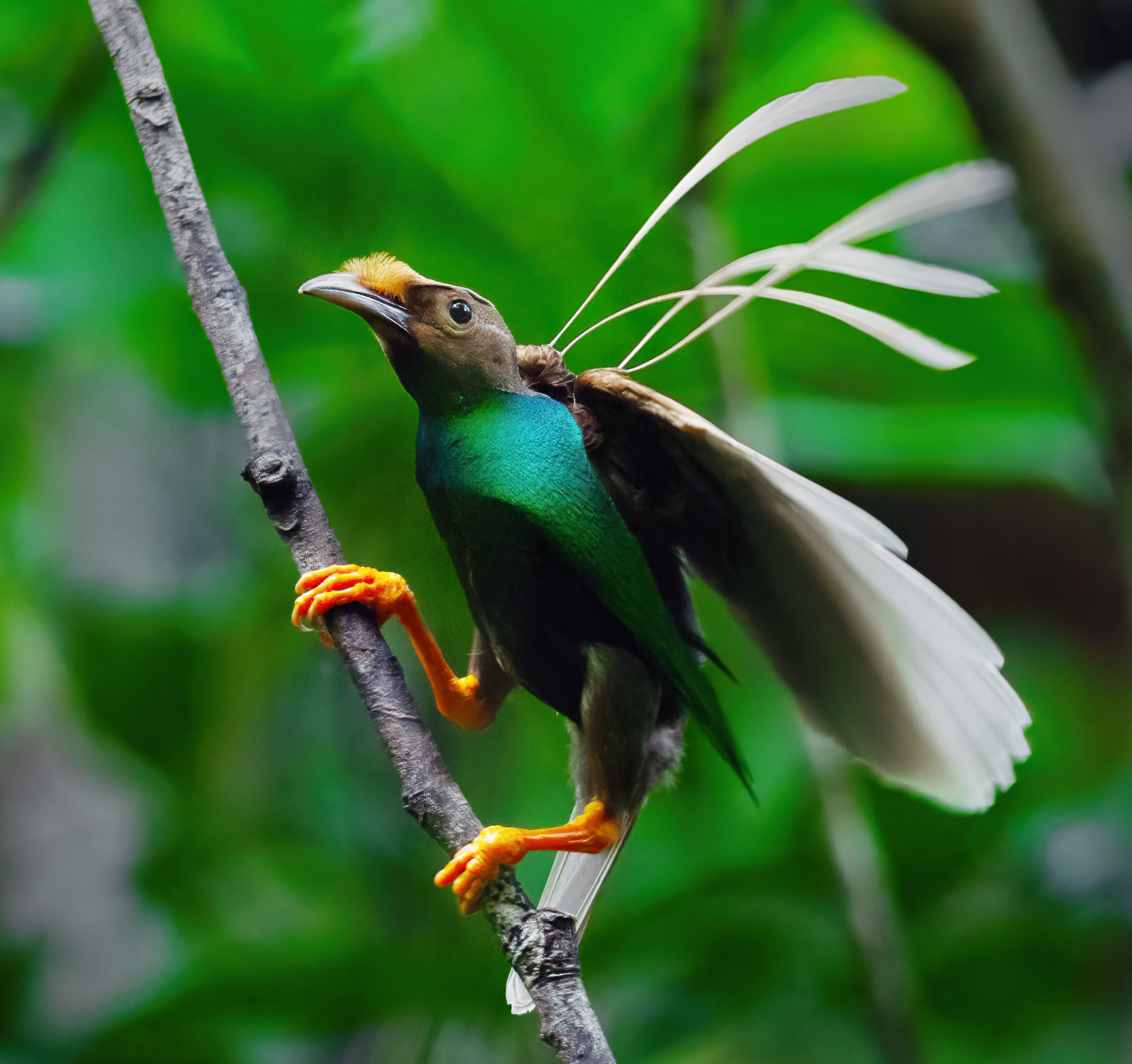

Conservation status
- Least Concern (IUCN 3.1)

Scientific classification
- Kingdom: Animalia
- Phylum: Chordata
- Class: Aves
- Order: Passeriformes
- Family: Paradisaeidae
- Genus: Semioptera; Gray, 1859
- Species: S. wallacii

Binomial name
- Semioptera wallacii G.R. Gray, 1859

= Standardwing bird-of-paradise =

Species of bird

The standardwing bird-of-paradise (Semioptera wallacii), also known as Wallace's standardwing or as the standardwing, is a species of bird-of-paradise. It is the only member in monotypic genus Semioptera.

== Etymology ==
George Robert Gray of the British Museum named this species in honour of Alfred Russel Wallace, British naturalist and author of The Malay Archipelago, who in 1858 was the first European to describe the bird. The generic name Semioptera is composed of semeion for a flag or military standard and ptera for wings.

== Subspecies and taxonomy ==
The standardwing bird-of-paradises' closest relatives are the superb birds-of-paradise (Lophorina species), and actually evolved after the Drepanornis sicklebills, making them one of their other closest relatives. It has two subspecies:

- Semioptera wallacii halmaherae Salvadori, 1881
- Semioptera wallacii wallacii Gray, 1859

== Conservation status ==
A common species in its limited habitat range, the standardwing bird-of-paradise is evaluated as being of least concern on the IUCN Red List of Threatened Species due to its increasingly fragmented habitat. It is listed on Appendix II of CITES.

== Description ==
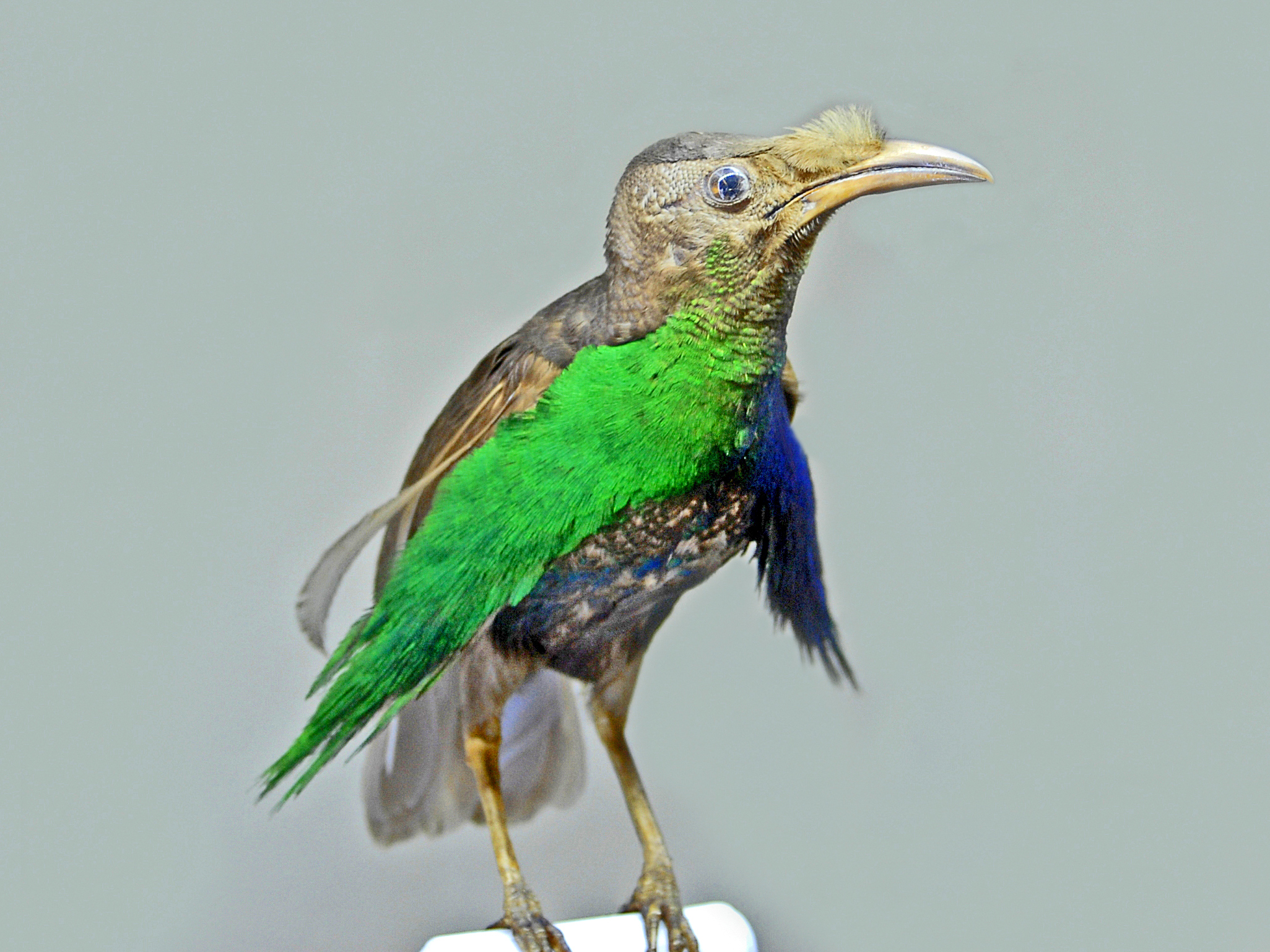
Semioptera wallacii wallacii male. Museum specimen

The standardwing bird-of-paradise is medium-sized, approximately 28 cm long, and olive brown. The male has a gloss violet-and-lilac coloured crown and emerald-green breast shield. Its most striking features are two pairs of long white plumes coming out from the bend of the wing that can be raised or lowered at the bird's will. The unadorned olive-brown female is smaller but has a longer tail than the male.

== Behaviour and ecology ==
The males are polygamous. They gather and perform a spectacular aerial display, "parachuting" with wings and its vivid green breast shield spread, and the wing "standards" fluttering above its back.

Its diet consists mainly of insects, arthropods and fruits.

== Distribution ==
The standardwing is endemic to Northern Maluku in eastern Indonesia and is the westernmost species of the true birds-of-paradise. It can be found on the islands of Halmahera and Bacan in lowland tropical rainforests and hills, and occasionally in woodland.

== History ==
The first introduction of a bird-of-paradise to Europe was a result of Ferdinand Magellan's first circumnavigation of the earth. When the voyagers were at Tidore in December 1521, they were offered a gift of beautiful dead birds by the ruler of Bacan to give to the King of Spain. Based on the circumstances and description of the birds in Antonio Pigafetta's account of the voyage, they were likely standardwings. An alternate account by Maximilianus Transylvanus introduced the term manucodiata (a corruption of the Malay manute-dewata; "bird of the gods"), used for birds-of-paradise up to the 19th century.

The first specimen of this particular species was found by a young, local assistant of Alfred Russel Wallace, named Ali, and this type specimen now resides in the collections of the University Museum of Zoology, Cambridge. Writing in his 1869 travelogue, The Malay Archipelago, Wallace described his first encounter:

“Just as I got home I overtook Ali returning from shooting with some birds hanging from his belt. He seemed much pleased, and said, ‘Look here, sir, what a curious bird,’ holding out what at first completely puzzled me. I saw a bird with a mass of splendid green feathers on its breast, elongated into two glittering tufts; but, what I could not understand was a pair of long white feathers, which stuck straight out from each shoulder. Ali assured me that the bird stuck them out this way itself, when fluttering its wings, and that they had remained so without his touching them. I now saw that I had got a great prize, no less than a completely new form of the Bird of Paradise, differing most remarkably from every other known bird”.

Following its original discovery in 1858, the standardwing bird-of-paradise was not seen again for nearly 60 years, and then only a handful of times until 1953. No further sightings were reported until the British ornithologist David Bishop rediscovered the species in 1983 and began making the first detailed observations of its behaviour.

The standardwing bird-of-paradise was filmed for the first time in 1986 for the BBC nature documentary Birds for All Seasons, when a cameraman Michael W. Richards stationed in the canopy captured footage of a male bird displaying. Ten years later, David Attenborough observed a mass display of dozens of males for the BBC Natural World film "Attenborough in Paradise", leading him to speculate that the reason for their extravagant behaviour is to establish the hierarchy for breeding rights, rather than to directly impress the females.

In 2018, David Attenborough was invited to place one of the standardwing bird-of-paradise from Wallace's collection in its display as part of the reopening ceremony for the redeveloped Cambridge University Museum of Zoology.
