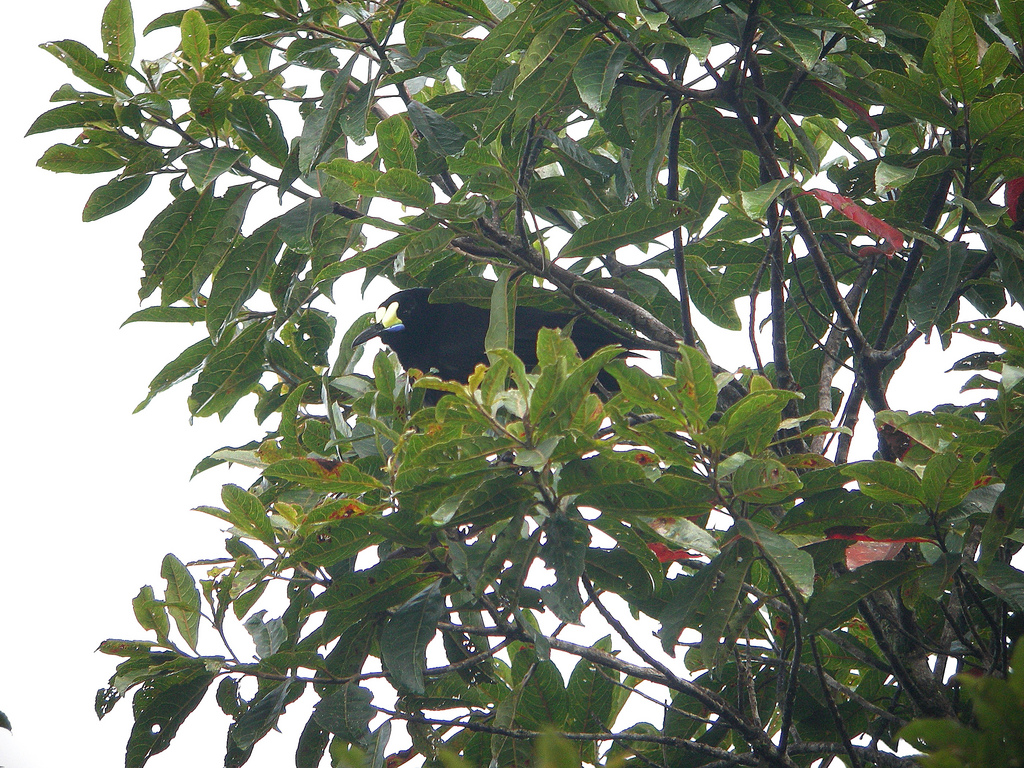
- Short-tailed paradigalla, Paradigalla brevicauda

Scientific classification
- Kingdom: Animalia
- Phylum: Chordata
- Class: Aves
- Order: Passeriformes
- Family: Paradisaeidae
- Genus: Paradigalla; Lesson, 1835

= Paradigalla =

Genus of birds

The genus Paradigalla consists of two species of birds-of-paradise. Both are medium-sized black birds with blue and yellow facial wattles.

The name of the genus is derived from two words, the Paradisaea and Gallus, the junglefowl of pheasant family. The two paradigallas and the four junglefowls exhibits facial wattles.

== Species ==
Image	Common name	Scientific name	Distribution
	Long-tailed paradigalla	Paradigalla carunculata	Endemic to the Arfak Mountains in the Doberai Peninsula, West Papua, Indonesia.
	Short-tailed paradigalla	Paradigalla brevicauda	New Guinea Highlands forests.
