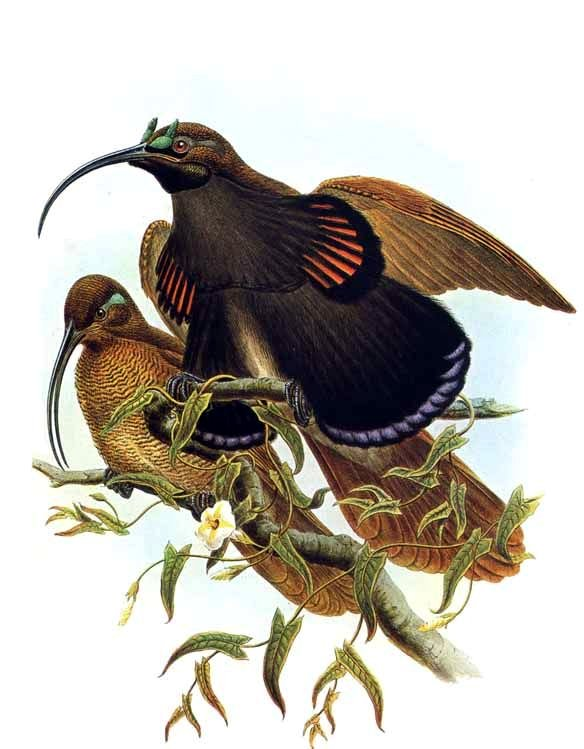
- Black-billed sicklebill (Drepanornis albertisi)

Scientific classification
- Kingdom: Animalia
- Phylum: Chordata
- Class: Aves
- Order: Passeriformes
- Family: Paradisaeidae
- Genus: Drepanornis; P.L. Sclater, 1873

Type species
- Drepanephorus albertisi P.L. Sclater, 1873

= Drepanornis =

Genus of birds

Drepanornis is a genus of bird-of-paradise found in forests of New Guinea. They have long decurved sickle-like bills and an overall brown plumage.

The genus is sometimes considered a subgenus of Epimachus, but the two members of Drepanornis have a far shorter tail and their sexual dimorphism is less extreme.

== Species ==
Image	Common name	Scientific name	Distribution
	Black-billed sicklebill	Drepanornis albertisi	Mountainous areas with a scattered range of presence across western, central and eastern New Guinea, mostly in tropical montane forests at altitudes of 1,100 to 1,900 m.
	Pale-billed sicklebill	Drepanornis bruijnii	Lowland rainforests of northern and northwestern New Guinea.
