= List of birds of Papua New Guinea =

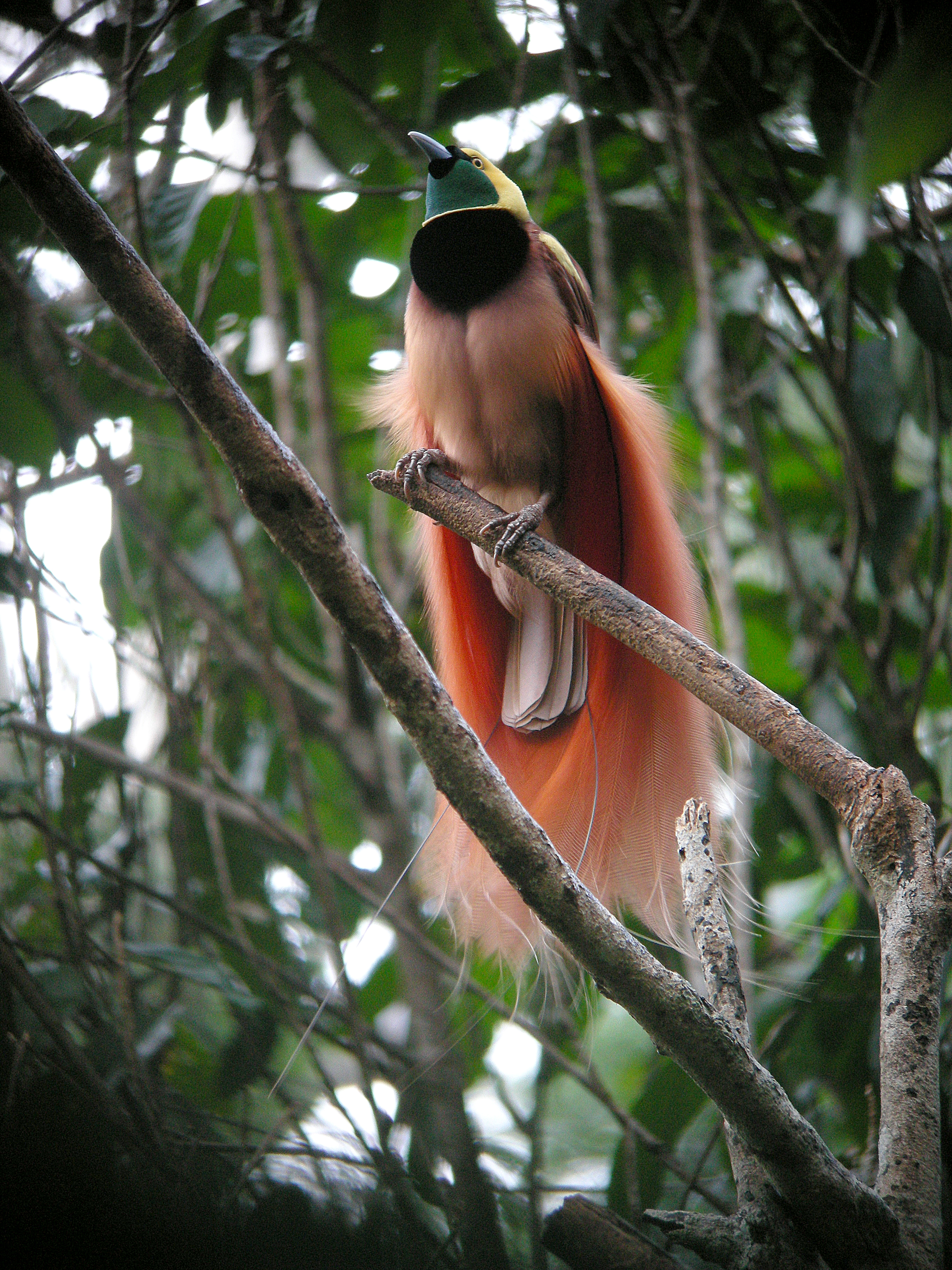
The Raggiana bird of paradise is the national bird of Papua New Guinea.

This is a list of the bird species recorded in Papua New Guinea. The avifauna of Papua New Guinea include a total of 897 species, of which 108 are endemic, and 2 have been introduced by humans. 44 species are globally threatened.

This list's taxonomic treatment (designation and sequence of orders, families and species) and nomenclature (common and scientific names) follow the conventions of The Clements Checklist of Birds of the World, 2022 edition. The family accounts at the beginning of each heading reflect this taxonomy, as do the species counts in each family account. Introduced and accidental species are included in the total counts for Papua New Guinea.

The following tags have been used to highlight several categories. The commonly occurring native species do not fall into any of these categories.

- (A) Accidental - a species that rarely or accidentally occurs in Papua New Guinea
- (E) Endemic - a species that is native only to Papua New Guinea
- (I) Introduced - a species introduced to Papua New Guinea as a consequence, direct or indirect, of human actions

== Cassowaries and emu ==
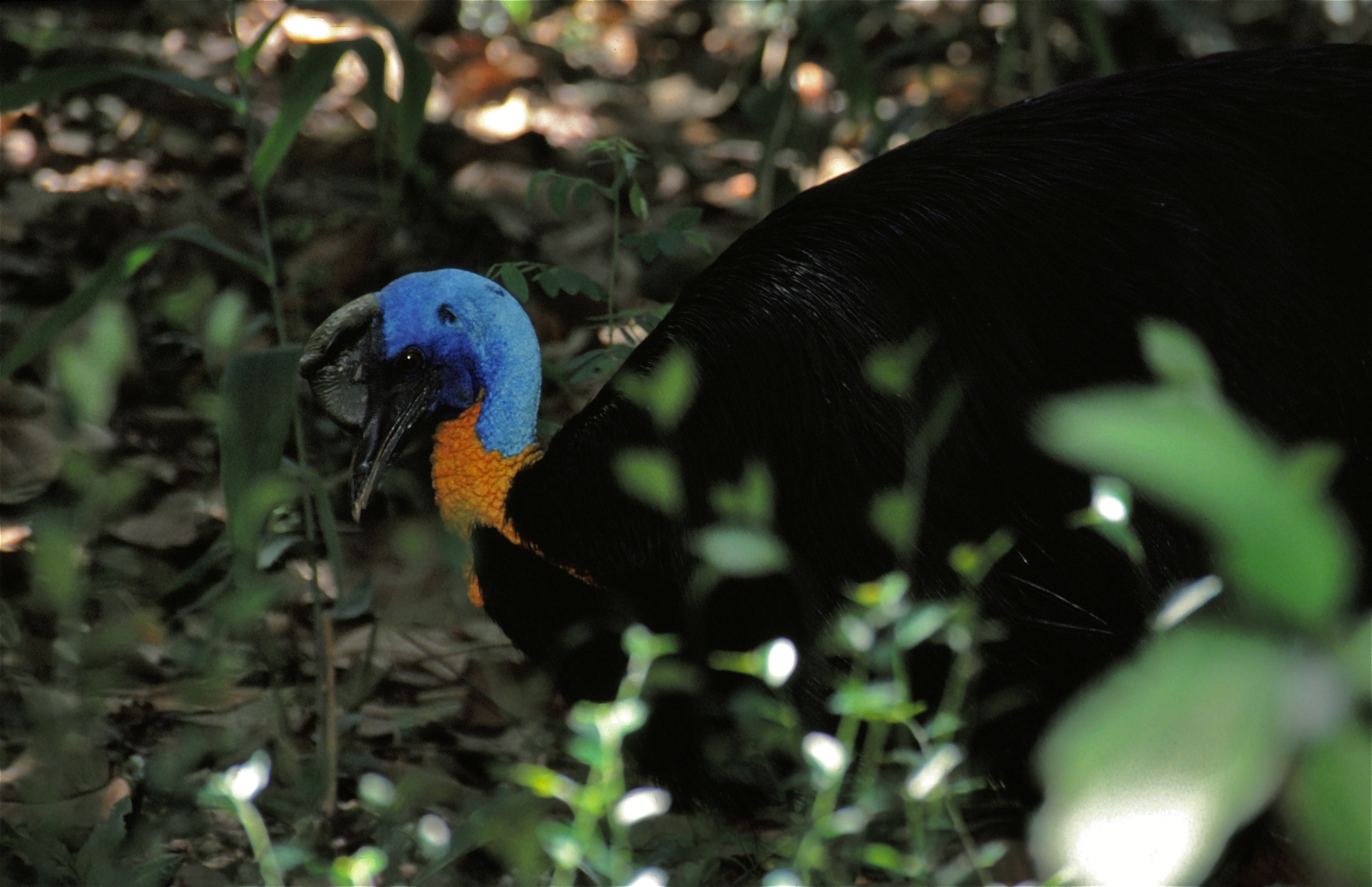
Northern cassowary

Order: Struthioniformes Family: Casuariidae

The cassowaries are large flightless birds native to Australia and New Guinea.

- Southern cassowary, Casuarius casuarius
- Dwarf cassowary, Casuarius bennetti
- Northern cassowary, Casuarius unappendiculatus

== Magpie goose ==
Order: Anseriformes Family: Anseranatidae

The family contains a single species, the magpie goose. It was an early and distinctive offshoot of the anseriform family tree, diverging after the screamers and before all other ducks, geese and swans, sometime in the late Cretaceous.

- Magpie goose, Anseranas semipalmata

== Ducks, geese, and waterfowl ==
Order: Anseriformes Family: Anatidae

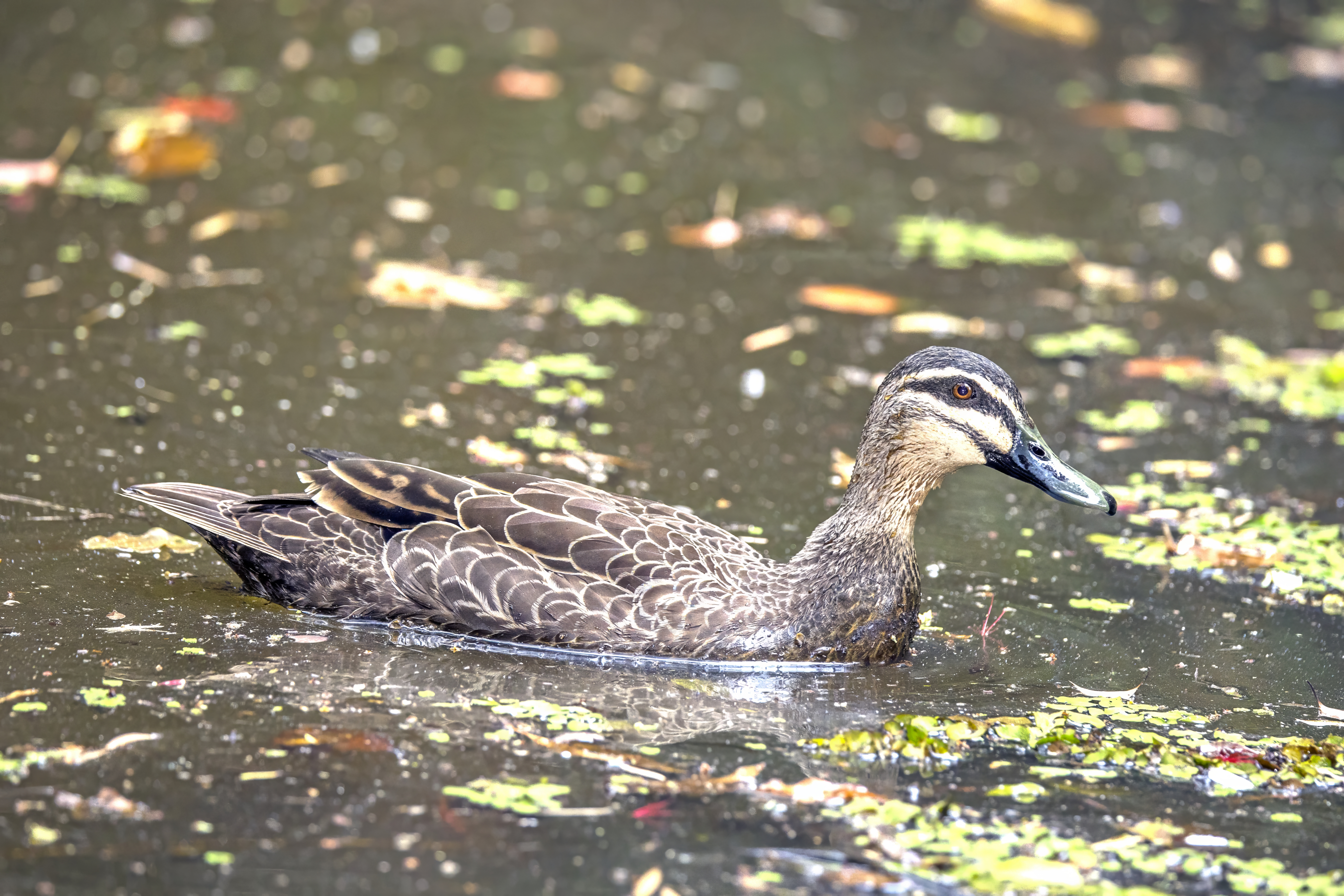
Pacific black duck

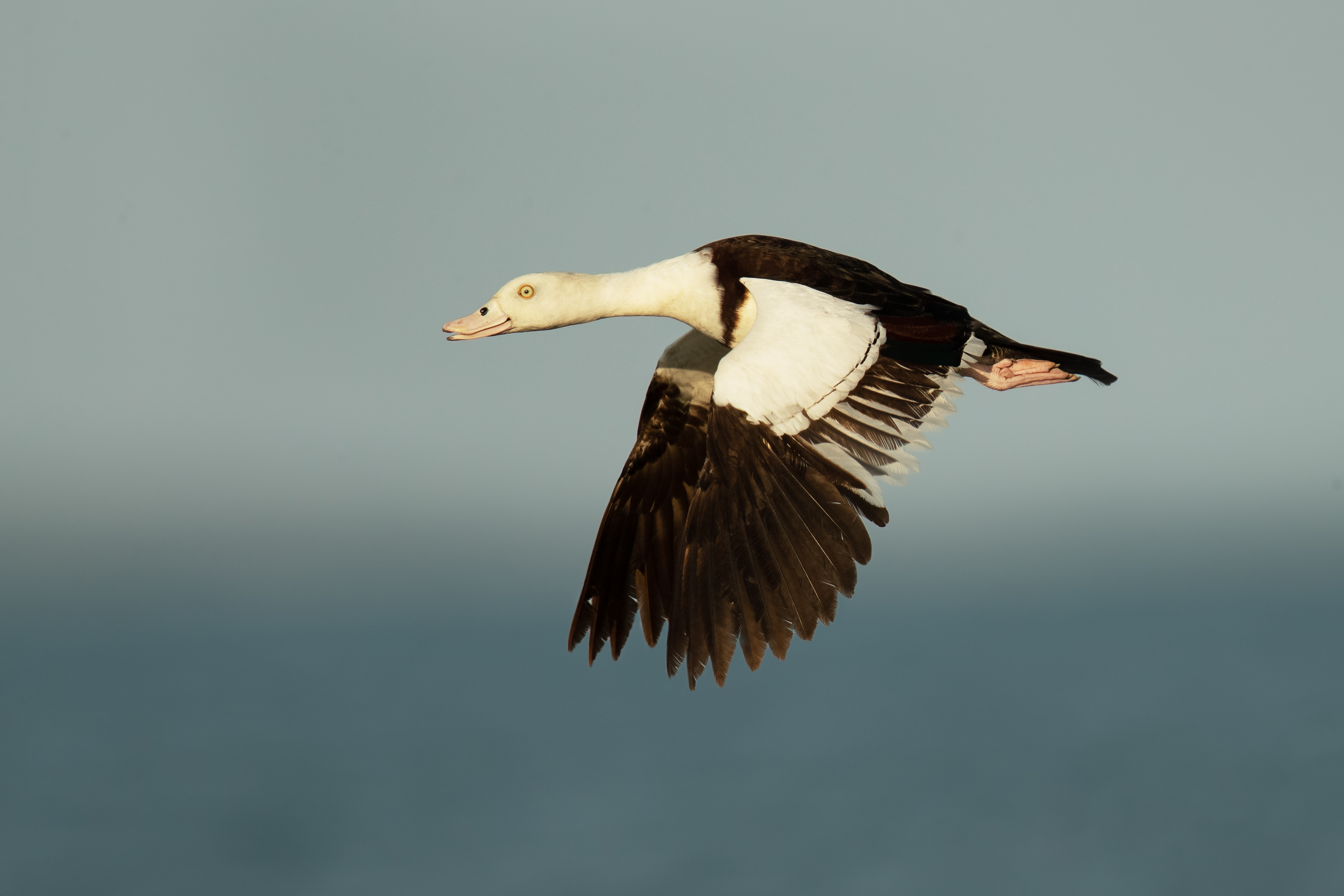
Radjah shelduck

Anatidae includes the ducks and most duck-like waterfowl, such as geese and swans. These birds are adapted to an aquatic existence with webbed feet, flattened bills, and feathers that are excellent at shedding water due to an oily coating.

- Spotted whistling-duck, Dendrocygna guttata
- Plumed whistling-duck, Dendrocygna eytoni
- Wandering whistling-duck, Dendrocygna arcuata
- Black swan, Cygnus atratus (A)
- Radjah shelduck, Radjah radjah
- Green pygmy-goose, Nettapus pulchellus
- Cotton pygmy-goose, Nettapus coromandelianus
- Maned duck, Chenonetta jubata (A)
- Salvadori's teal, Salvadorina waigiuensis
- Garganey, Spatula querquedula
- Northern shoveler, Spatula clypeata (A)
- Eurasian wigeon, Mareca penelope
- Pacific black duck, Anas superciliosa
- Sunda teal, Anas gibberifrons (A)
- Gray teal, Anas gracilis
- Hardhead, Aythya australis
- Tufted duck, Aythya fuligula (A)

== Megapodes ==
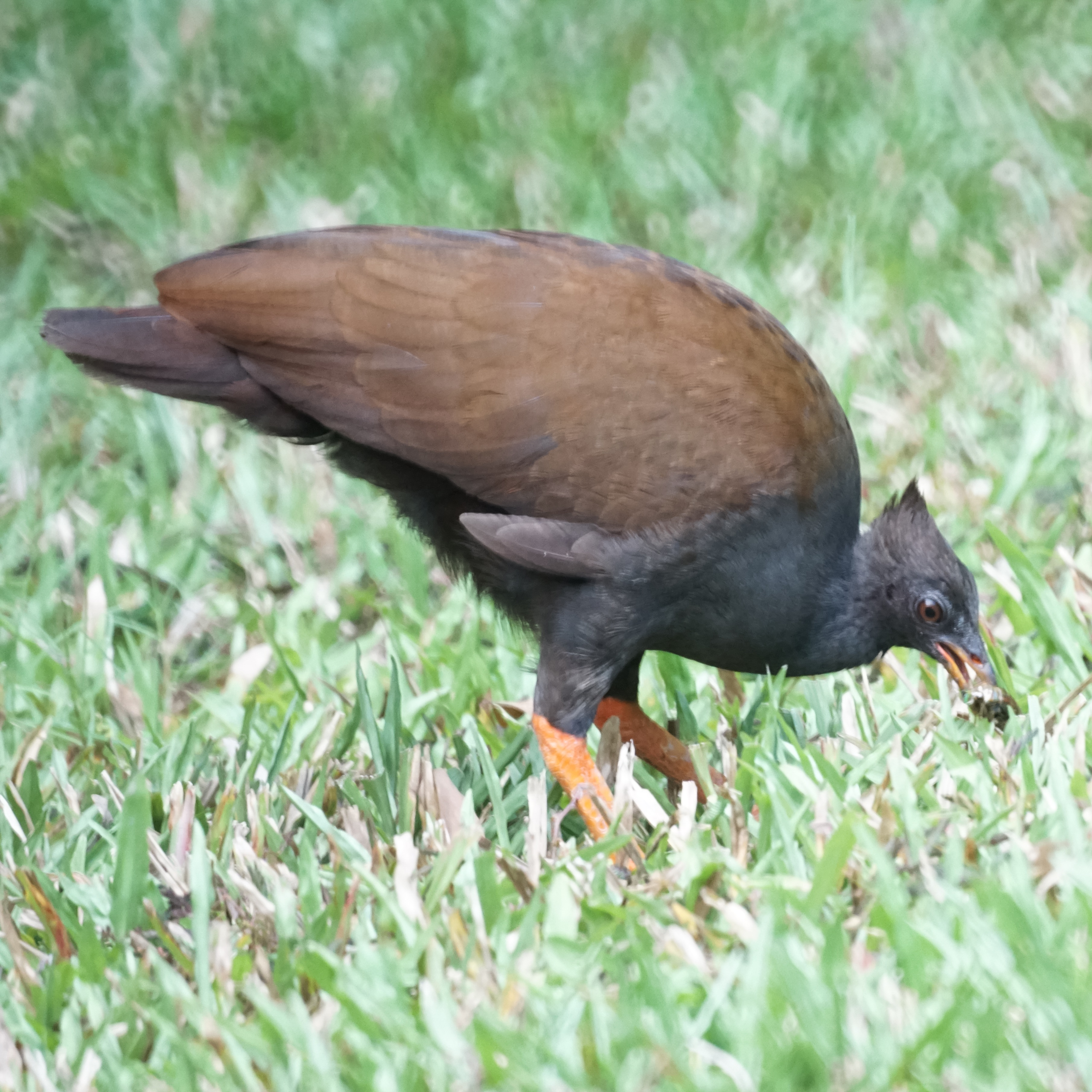
Orange footed Scrubfowl

Order: Galliformes Family: Megapodiidae

The Megapodiidae are stocky, medium-large chicken-like birds with small heads and large feet. All but the malleefowl occupy jungle habitats and most have brown or black colouring.

- Wattled brushturkey, Aepypodius arfakianus
- Yellow-legged brushturkey, Talegalla fuscirostris
- Red-legged brushturkey, Talegalla jobiensis
- Dusky scrubfowl, Megapodius freycinet
- Melanesian scrubfowl, Megapodius eremita
- New Guinea scrubfowl, Megapodius affinis
- Orange-footed scrubfowl, Megapodius reinwardt

== Pheasants, grouse, and allies ==
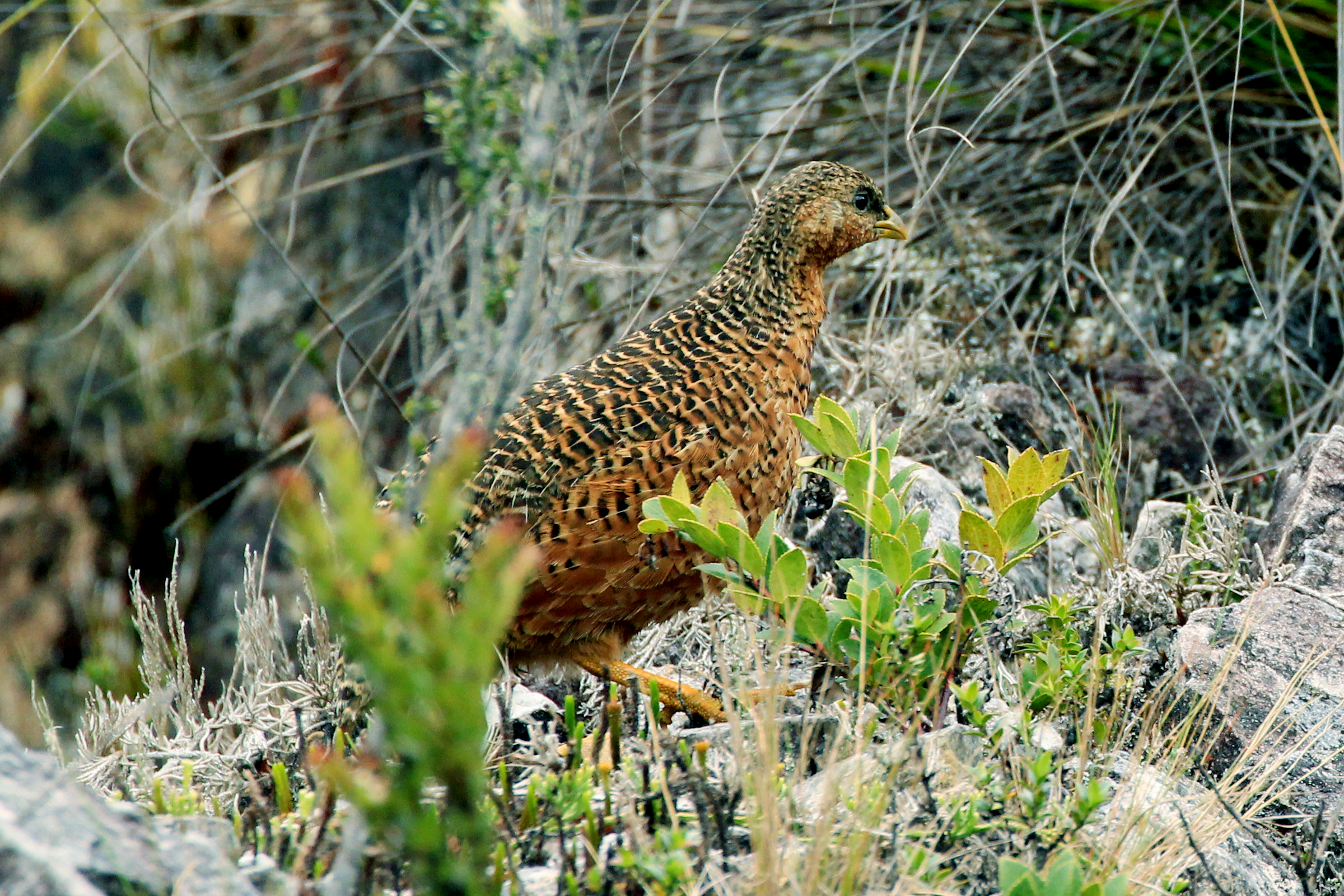
Snow mountain quail

Order: Galliformes Family: Phasianidae

The Phasianidae are a family of terrestrial birds. In general, they are plump (although they vary in size) and have broad, relatively short wings.

- Brown quail, Synoicus ypsilophorus
- Blue-breasted quail, Synoicus chinensis
- Snow Mountain quail, Synoicus monorthonyx

== Grebes ==
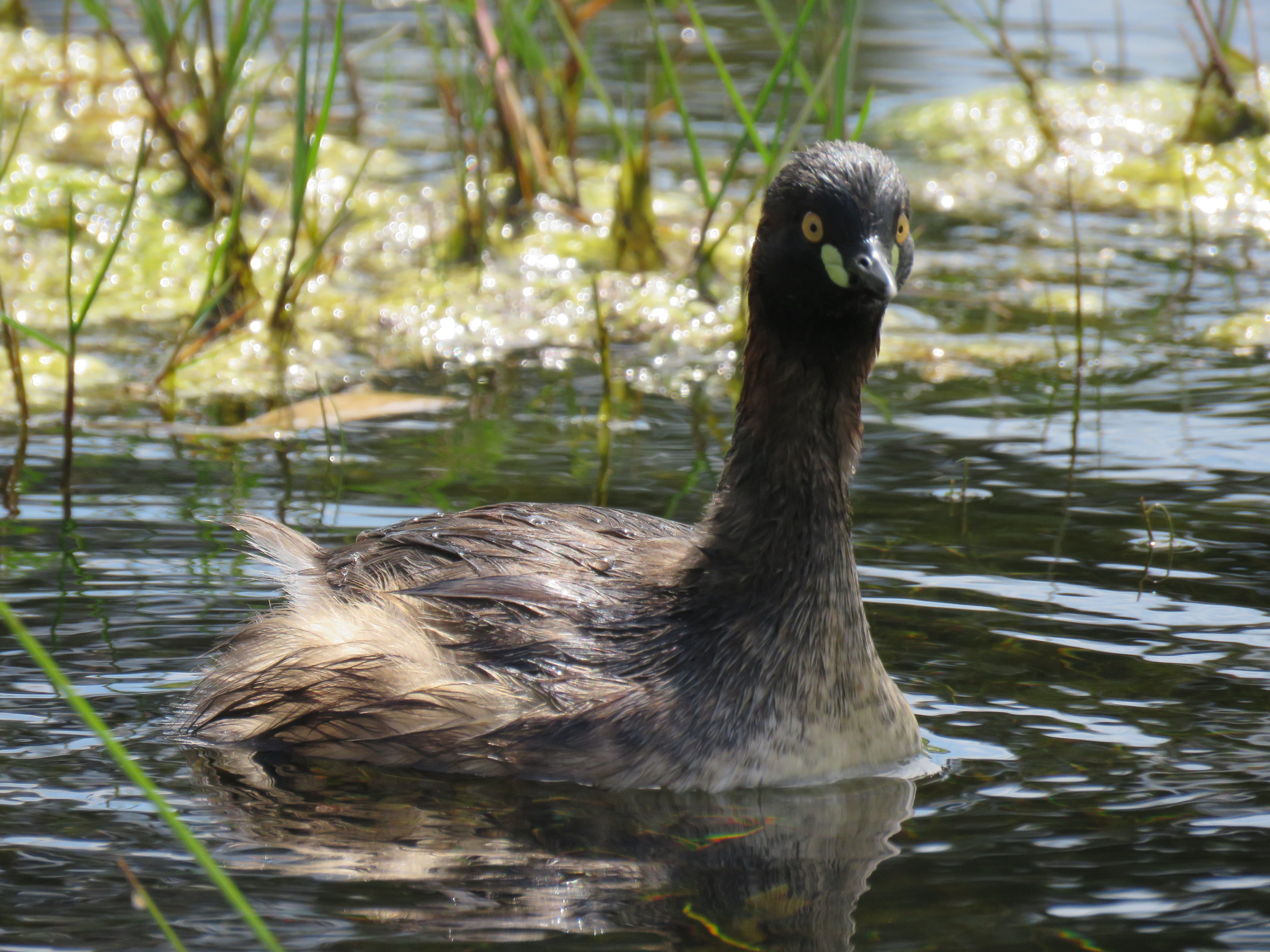
Australian grebe

Order: Podicipediformes Family: Podicipedidae

Grebes are small to medium-large freshwater diving birds. They have lobed toes and are excellent swimmers and divers. However, they have their feet placed far back on the body, making them quite ungainly on land.

- Little grebe, Tachybaptus ruficollis
- Australasian grebe, Tachybaptus novaehollandiae

== Pigeons and doves ==
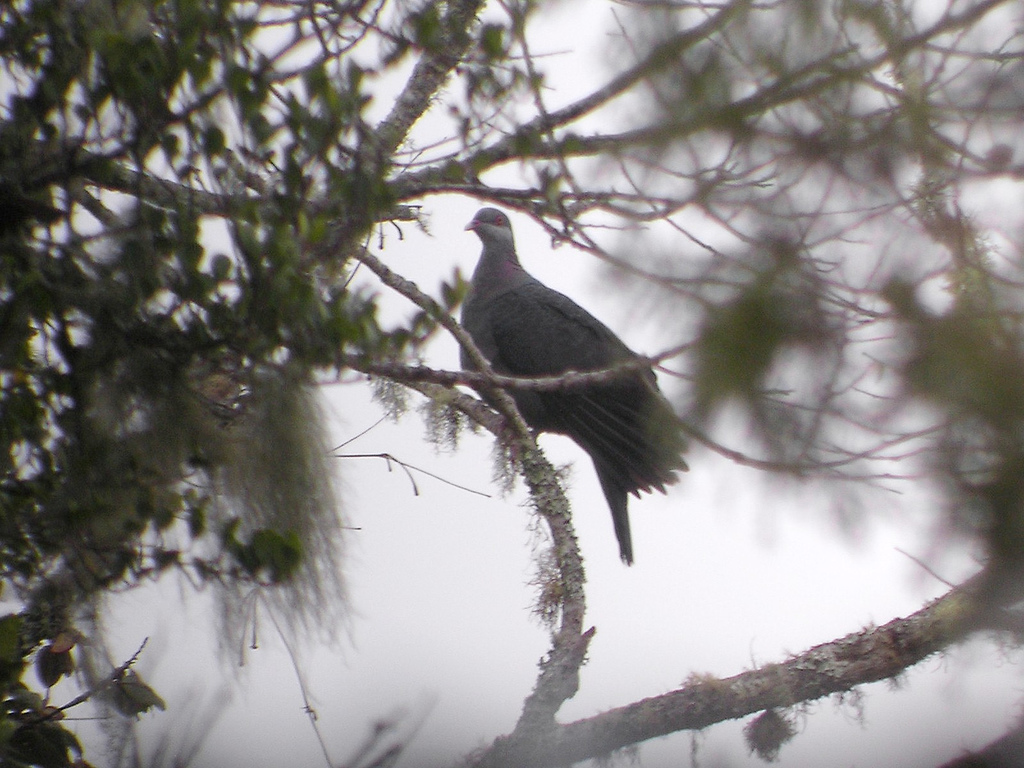
Metallic pigeon

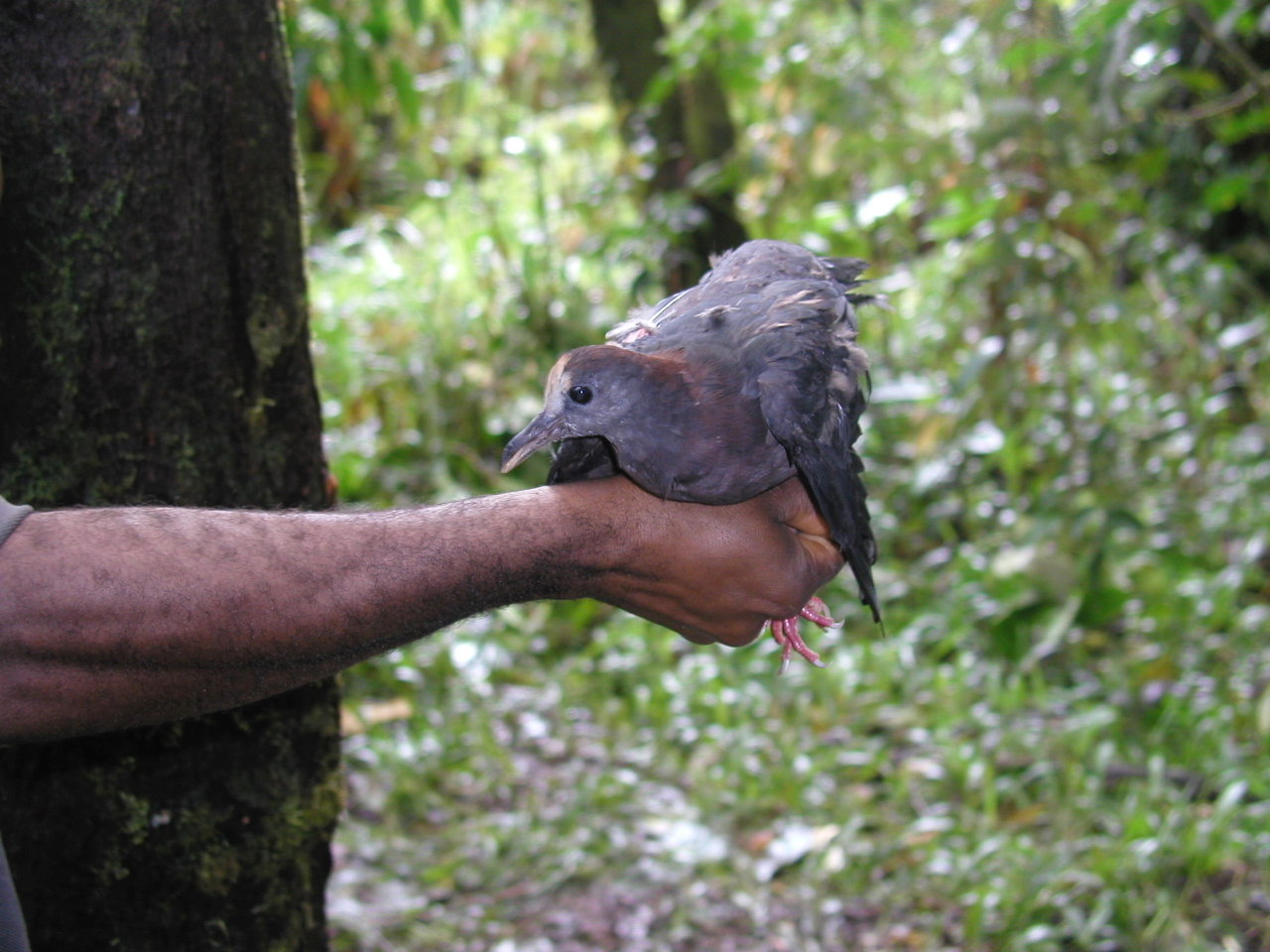
New Guinea bronzewing

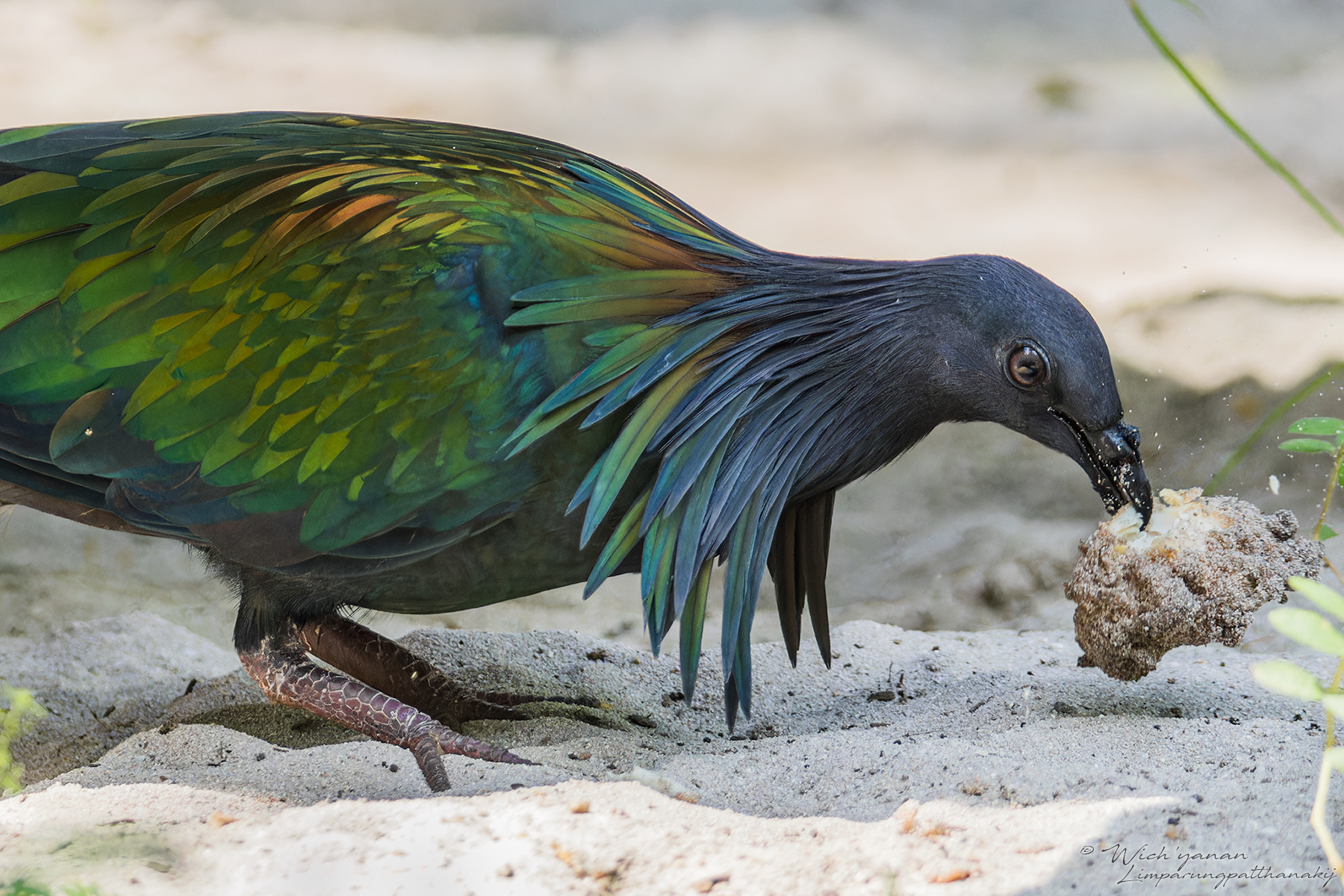
Nicobar pigeon

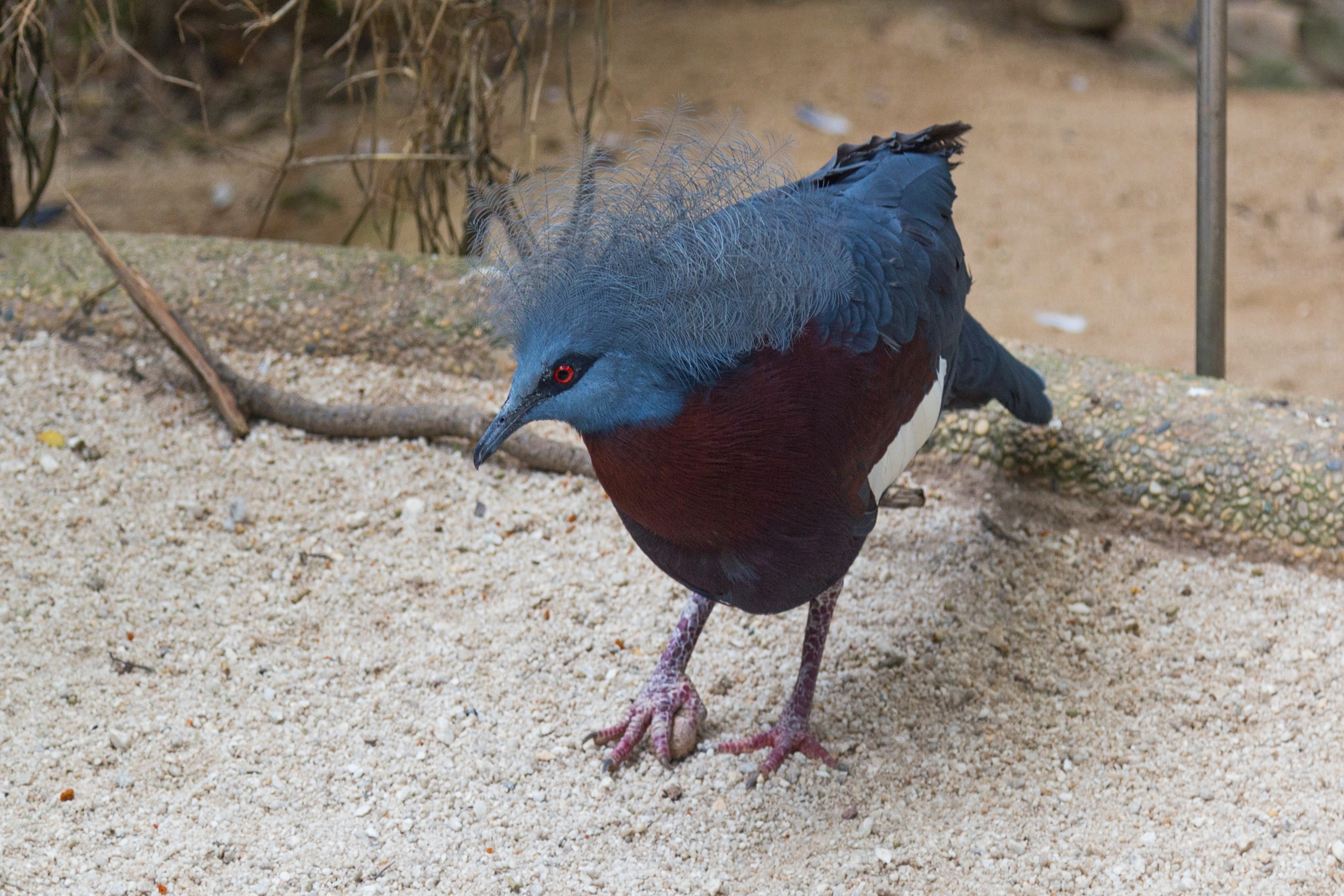
Sclater's crowned pigeon

Order: Columbiformes Family: Columbidae

Pigeons and doves are stout-bodied birds with short necks and short slender bills with a fleshy cere.

- Rock pigeon, Columba livia
- Metallic pigeon, Columba vitiensis
- Yellow-legged pigeon, Columba pallidiceps
- Spotted dove, Spilopelia chinensis (A)
- Amboyna cuckoo-dove, Macropygia amboinensis
- Sultan's cuckoo-dove, Macropygia doreya
- Black-billed cuckoo-dove, Macropygia nigrirostris
- Mackinlay's cuckoo-dove, Macropygia mackinlayi
- Great cuckoo-dove, Reinwardtoena reinwardti
- Pied cuckoo-dove, Reinwardtoena browni (E)
- Crested cuckoo-dove, Reinwardtoena crassirostris
- Pacific emerald dove, Chalcophaps longirostris
- Stephan's dove, Chalcophaps stephani
- New Guinea bronzewing, Henicophaps albifrons
- New Britain bronzewing, Henicophaps foersteri (E)
- Bronze ground dove, Alopecoenas beccarii
- White-bibbed ground dove, Alopecoenas jobiensis
- Zebra dove, Geopelia striata
- Peaceful dove, Geopelia placida
- Bar-shouldered dove, Geopelia humeralis
- Nicobar pigeon, Caloenas nicobarica
- Cinnamon ground dove, Gallicolumba rufigula
- Thick-billed ground-pigeon, Trugon terrestris
- Pheasant pigeon, Otidiphaps nobilis
- Western crowned-pigeon, Goura cristata
- Sclater's crowned-pigeon, Goura sclaterii
- Scheepmaker's crowned-pigeon, Goura scheepmakeri (E)
- Victoria crowned-pigeon, Goura victoria
- Wompoo fruit-dove, Ptilinopus magnificus
- Pink-spotted fruit-dove, Ptilinopus perlatus
- Ornate fruit-dove, Ptilinopus ornatus
- Orange-fronted fruit-dove, Ptilinopus aurantiifrons
- Superb fruit-dove, Ptilinopus superbus
- Rose-crowned fruit-dove, Ptilinopus regina
- Coroneted fruit-dove, Ptilinopus coronulatus
- Beautiful fruit-dove, Ptilinopus pulchellus
- White-breasted fruit-dove, Ptilinopus rivoli
- Yellow-bibbed fruit-dove, Ptilinopus solomonensis
- Claret-breasted fruit-dove, Ptilinopus viridis
- Orange-bellied fruit-dove, Ptilinopus iozonus
- Knob-billed fruit-dove, Ptilinopus insolitus (E)
- Dwarf fruit-dove, Ptilinopus nainus
- Spectacled imperial-pigeon, Ducula perspicillata (A)
- Elegant imperial-pigeon, Ducula concinna (A)
- Pacific imperial-pigeon, Ducula pacifica
- Red-knobbed imperial-pigeon, Ducula rubricera
- Purple-tailed imperial-pigeon, Ducula rufigaster
- Finsch's imperial-pigeon, Ducula finschii (E)
- Rufescent imperial-pigeon, Ducula chalconota
- Island imperial-pigeon, Ducula pistrinaria
- Pinon's imperial-pigeon, Ducula pinon
- Bismarck imperial-pigeon, Ducula melanochroa (E)
- Collared imperial-pigeon, Ducula mullerii
- Zoe's imperial-pigeon, Ducula zoeae
- Pied imperial-pigeon, Ducula bicolor
- Yellowish imperial-pigeon, Ducula subflavescens (E)
- Torresian imperial-pigeon, Ducula spilorrhoa
- Topknot pigeon, Lopholaimus antarcticus
- Papuan mountain-pigeon, Gymnophaps albertisii
- Pale mountain-pigeon, Gymnophaps solomonensis

== Bustards ==
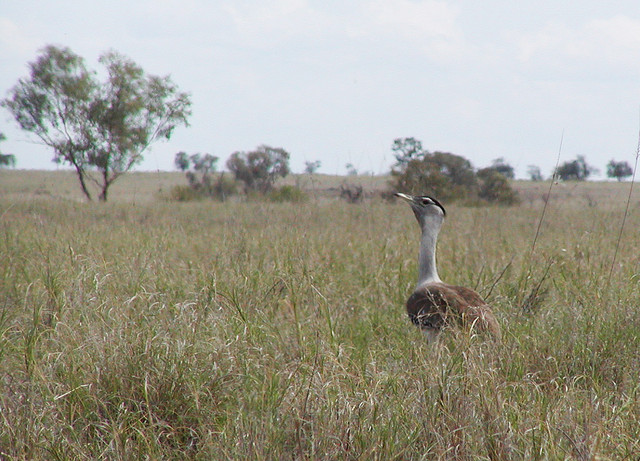
Australian bustard

Order: Otidiformes Family: Otididae

Bustards are large terrestrial birds mainly associated with dry open country and steppes in the Old World. They are omnivorous and nest on the ground. They walk steadily on strong legs and big toes, pecking for food as they go. They have long broad wings with "fingered" wingtips and striking patterns in flight. Many have interesting mating displays.

- Australian bustard, Ardeotis australis

== Cuckoos ==
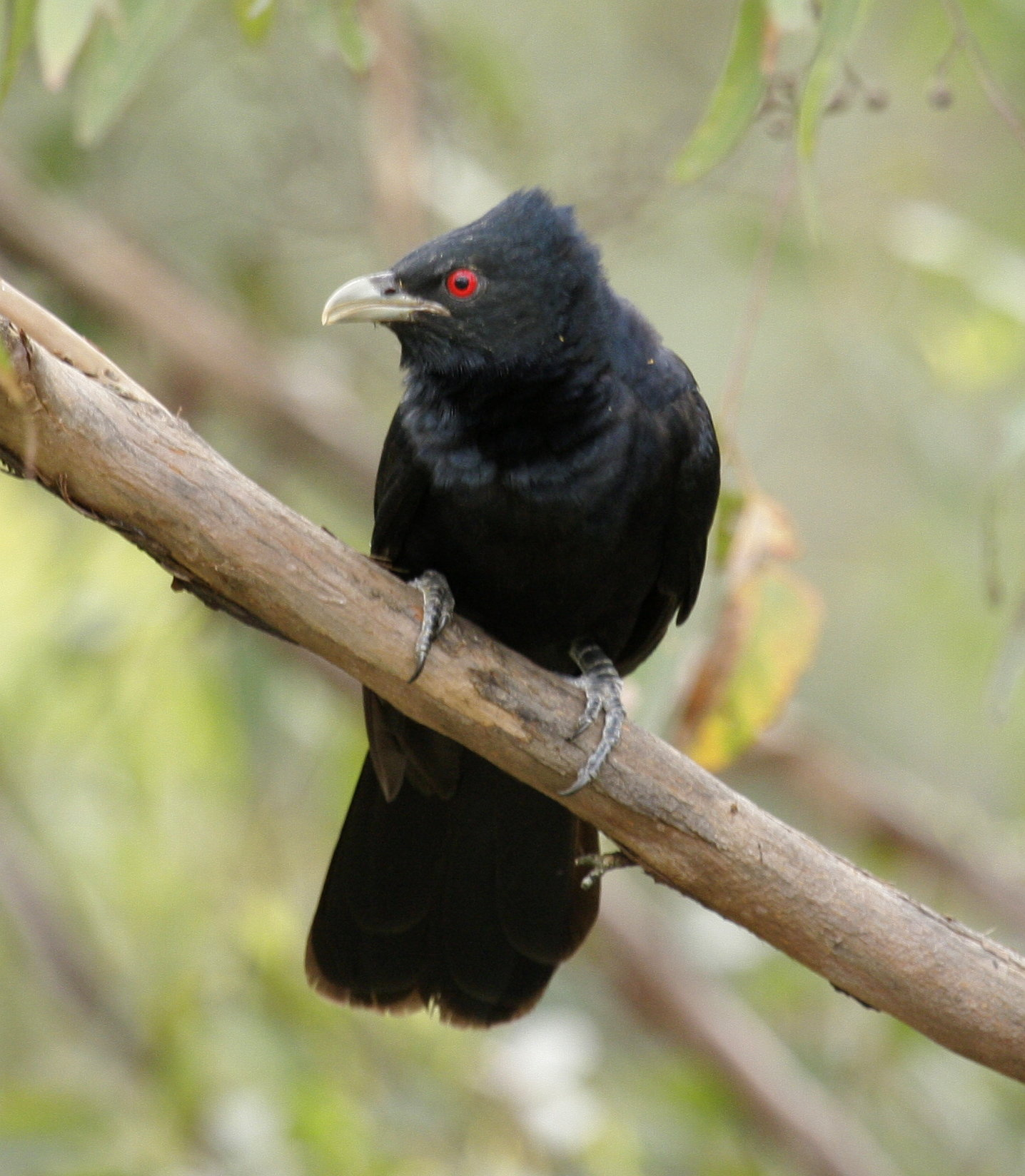
Pacific koel

Order: Cuculiformes Family: Cuculidae

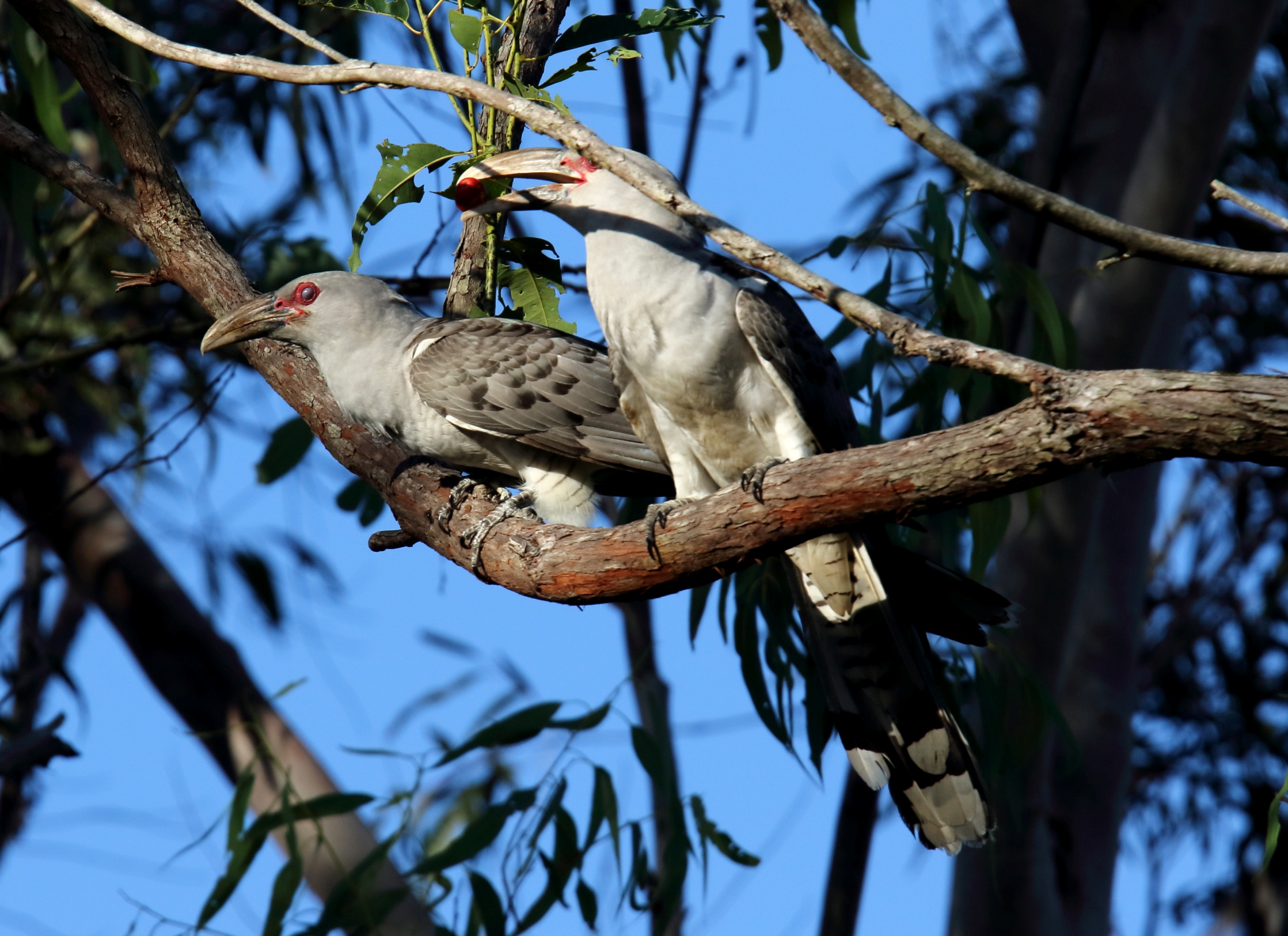
Channel billed cuckoo

The family Cuculidae includes cuckoos, roadrunners and anis. These birds are of variable size with slender bodies, long tails and strong legs. The Old World cuckoos are brood parasites.

- Pied coucal, Centropus ateralbus (E)
- Greater black coucal, Centropus menbeki
- Violaceous coucal, Centropus violaceus (E)
- Lesser black coucal, Centropus bernsteini
- Pheasant coucal, Centropus phasianinus
- Dwarf koel, Microdynamis parva
- Asian koel, Eudynamys scolopaceus
- Pacific koel, Eudynamys orientalis
- Long-tailed koel, Urodynamis taitensis
- Channel-billed cuckoo, Scythrops novaehollandiae
- Long-billed cuckoo, Chrysococcyx megarhynchus
- Horsfield's bronze-cuckoo, Chrysococcyx basalis
- Black-eared cuckoo, Chrysococcyx osculans
- Rufous-throated bronze-cuckoo, Chrysococcyx ruficollis
- Shining bronze-cuckoo, Chrysococcyx lucidus
- White-eared bronze-cuckoo, Chrysococcyx meyerii
- Little bronze-cuckoo, Chrysococcyx minutillus
- Pallid cuckoo, Cuculus pallidus
- White-crowned koel, Caliechthrus leucolophus
- Chestnut-breasted cuckoo, Cacomantis castaneiventris
- Fan-tailed cuckoo, Cacomantis flabelliformis
- Brush cuckoo, Cacomantis variolosus
- Himalayan cuckoo, Cuculus saturatus
- Oriental cuckoo, Cuculus optatus

== Frogmouths ==
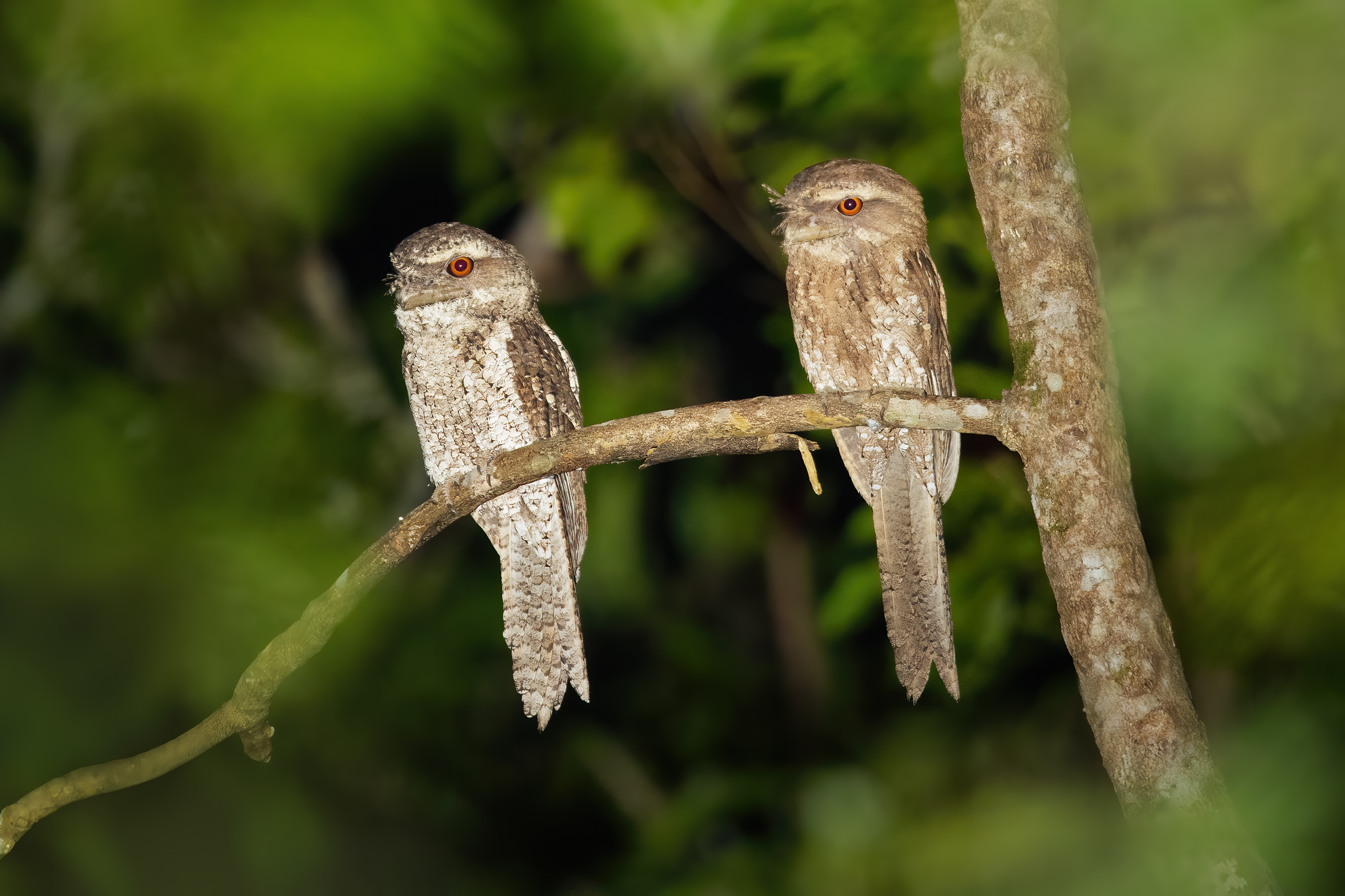
Marbled frogmouth

Order: Caprimulgiformes Family: Podargidae

The frogmouths are a group of nocturnal birds related to the nightjars. They are named for their large flattened hooked bill and huge frog-like gape, which they use to take insects.

- Marbled frogmouth, Podargus ocellatus
- Papuan frogmouth, Podargus papuensis
- Solomons frogmouth, Rigidipenna inexpectata

== Nightjars and allies ==
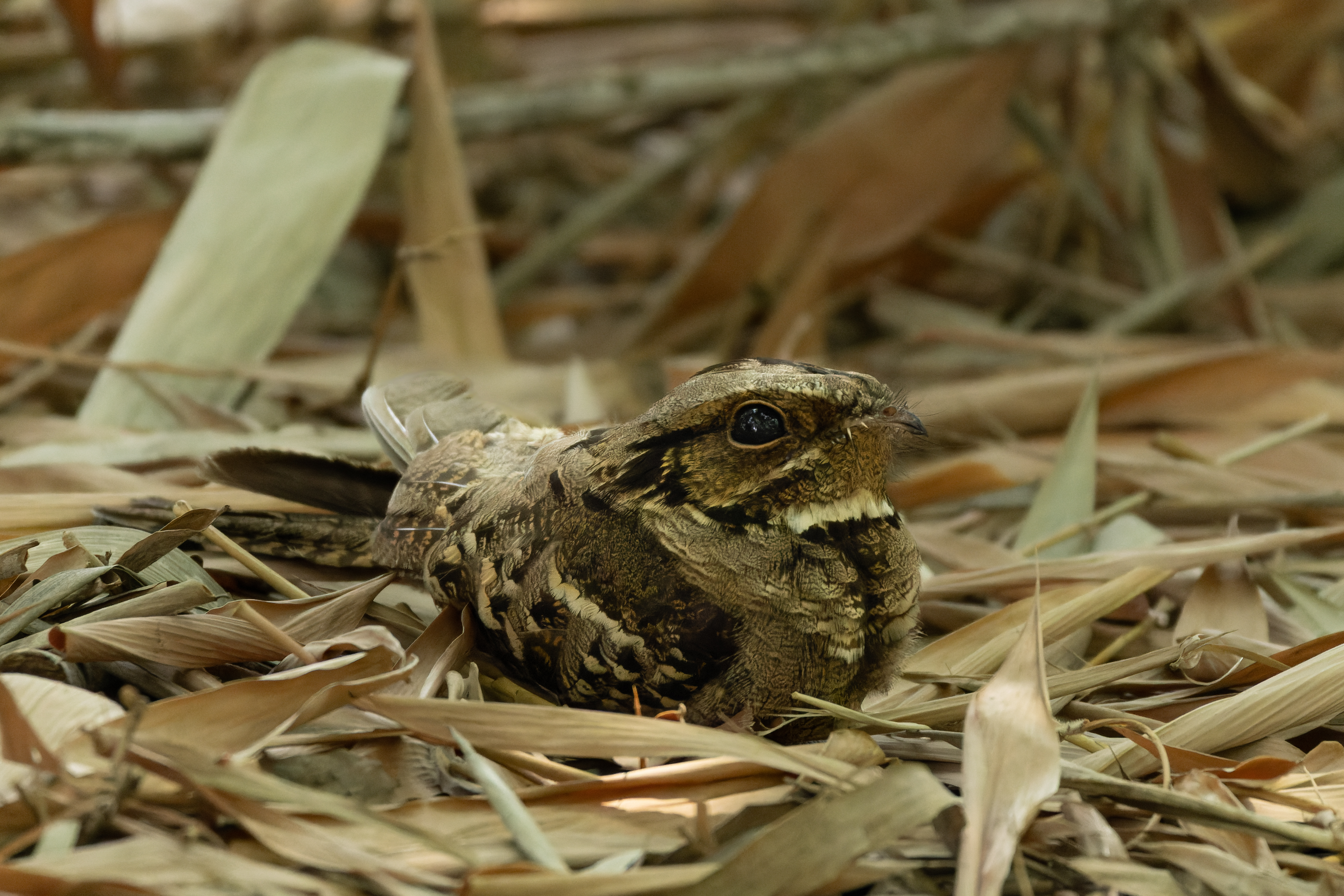
Large tailed nightjar

Order: Caprimulgiformes Family: Caprimulgidae

Nightjars are medium-sized nocturnal birds that usually nest on the ground. They have long wings, short legs and very short bills. Most have small feet, of little use for walking, and long pointed wings. Their soft plumage is camouflaged to resemble bark or leaves.

- White-throated nightjar, Eurostopodus mystacalis
- Papuan nightjar, Eurostopodus papuensis
- Archbold's nightjar, Eurostopodus archboldi
- Gray nightjar, Caprimulgus jotaka (A)
- Large-tailed nightjar, Caprimulgus macrurus

== Owlet-nightjars ==
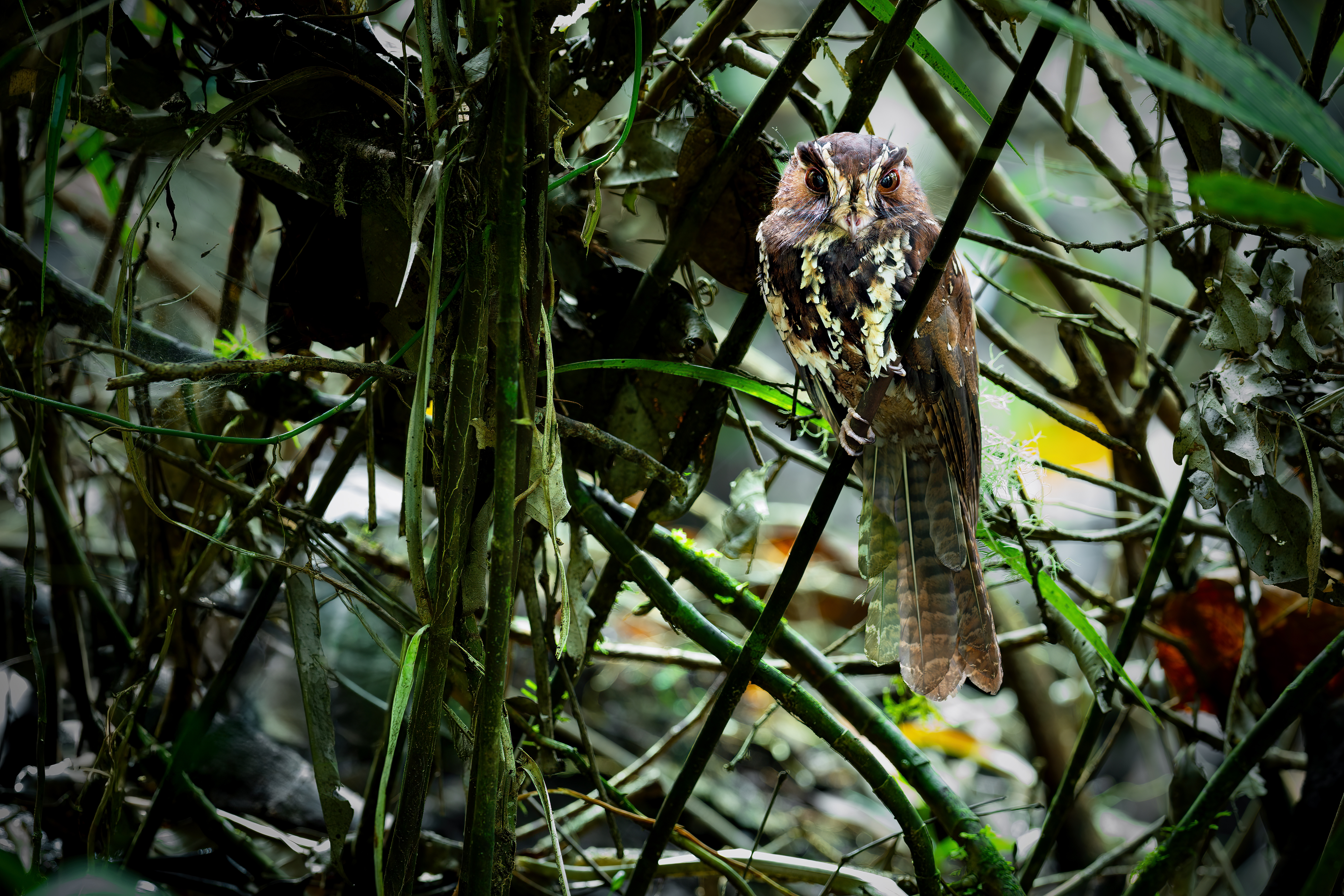
Feline owlet nightjar

Order: Caprimulgiformes Family: Aegothelidae

The owlet-nightjars are small nocturnal birds related to the nightjars and frogmouths. They are insectivores which hunt mostly in the air. Their soft plumage is a mixture of browns and paler shades.

- Feline owlet-nightjar, Aegotheles insignis
- Starry owlet-nightjar, Aegotheles tatei (E)
- Wallace's owlet-nightjar, Aegotheles wallacii
- Mountain owlet-nightjar, Aegotheles albertisi
- Australian owlet-nightjar, Aegotheles cristatus
- Barred owlet-nightjar, Aegotheles bennettii

== Swifts ==
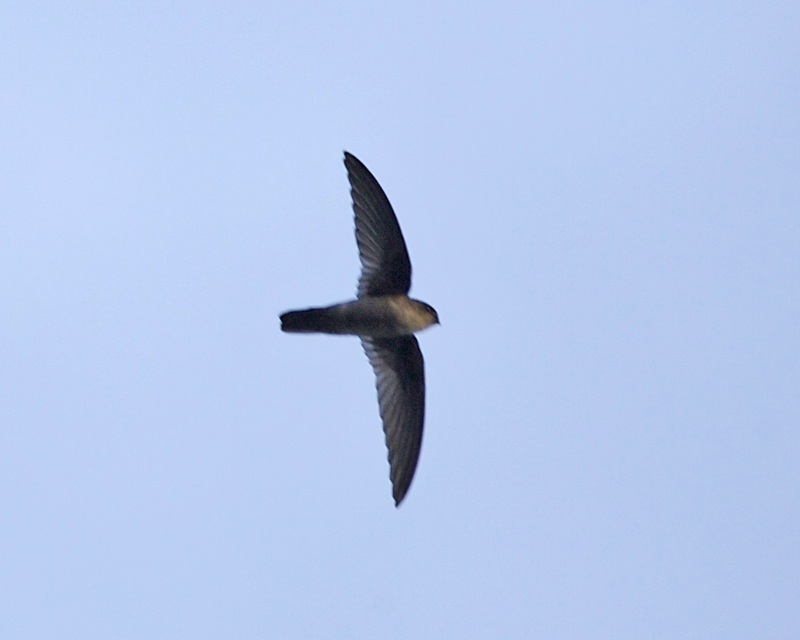
Uniform swiftlet

Order: Caprimulgiformes Family: Apodidae

Swifts are small birds which spend the majority of their lives flying. These birds have very short legs and never settle voluntarily on the ground, perching instead only on vertical surfaces. Many swifts have long swept-back wings which resemble a crescent or boomerang.

- Papuan spinetailed swift, Mearnsia novaeguineae
- White-throated needletail, Hirundapus caudacutus
- Glossy swiftlet, Collocalia esculenta
- Satin swiftlet, Collocalia uropygialis
- Mountain swiftlet, Aerodramus hirundinaceus
- White-rumped swiftlet, Aerodramus spodiopygius
- Australian swiftlet, Aerodramus terraereginae
- Bare-legged swiftlet, Aerodramus nuditarsus
- Mayr's swiftlet, Aerodramus orientalis
- Uniform swiftlet, Aerodramus vanikorensis
- Three-toed swiftlet, Aerodramus papuensis
- Pacific swift, Apus pacificus

== Treeswifts ==
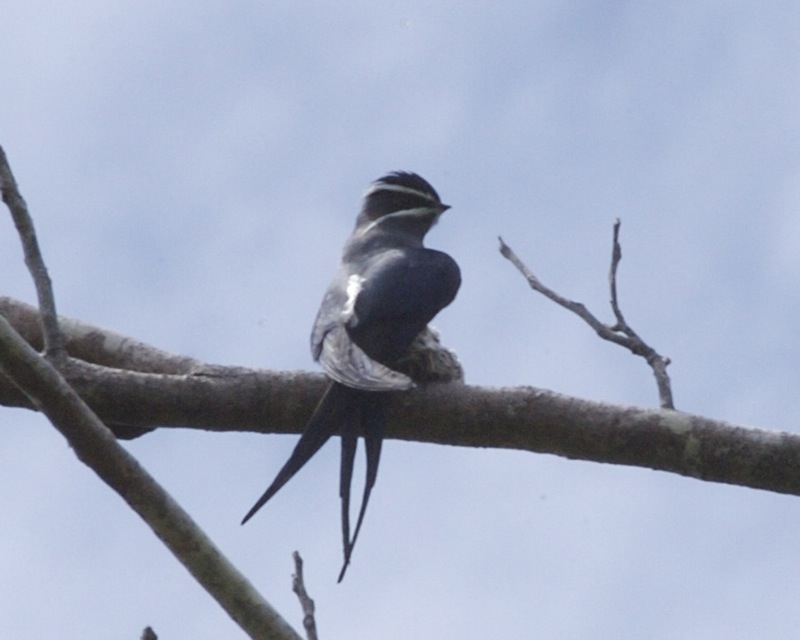
Moustached treeswift

Order: Caprimulgiformes Family: Hemiprocnidae

The treeswifts, also called crested swifts, are closely related to the true swifts. They differ from the other swifts in that they have crests, long forked tails and softer plumage.

- Moustached treeswift, Hemiprocne mystacea

== Rails, gallinules, and coots ==
Order: Gruiformes Family: Rallidae

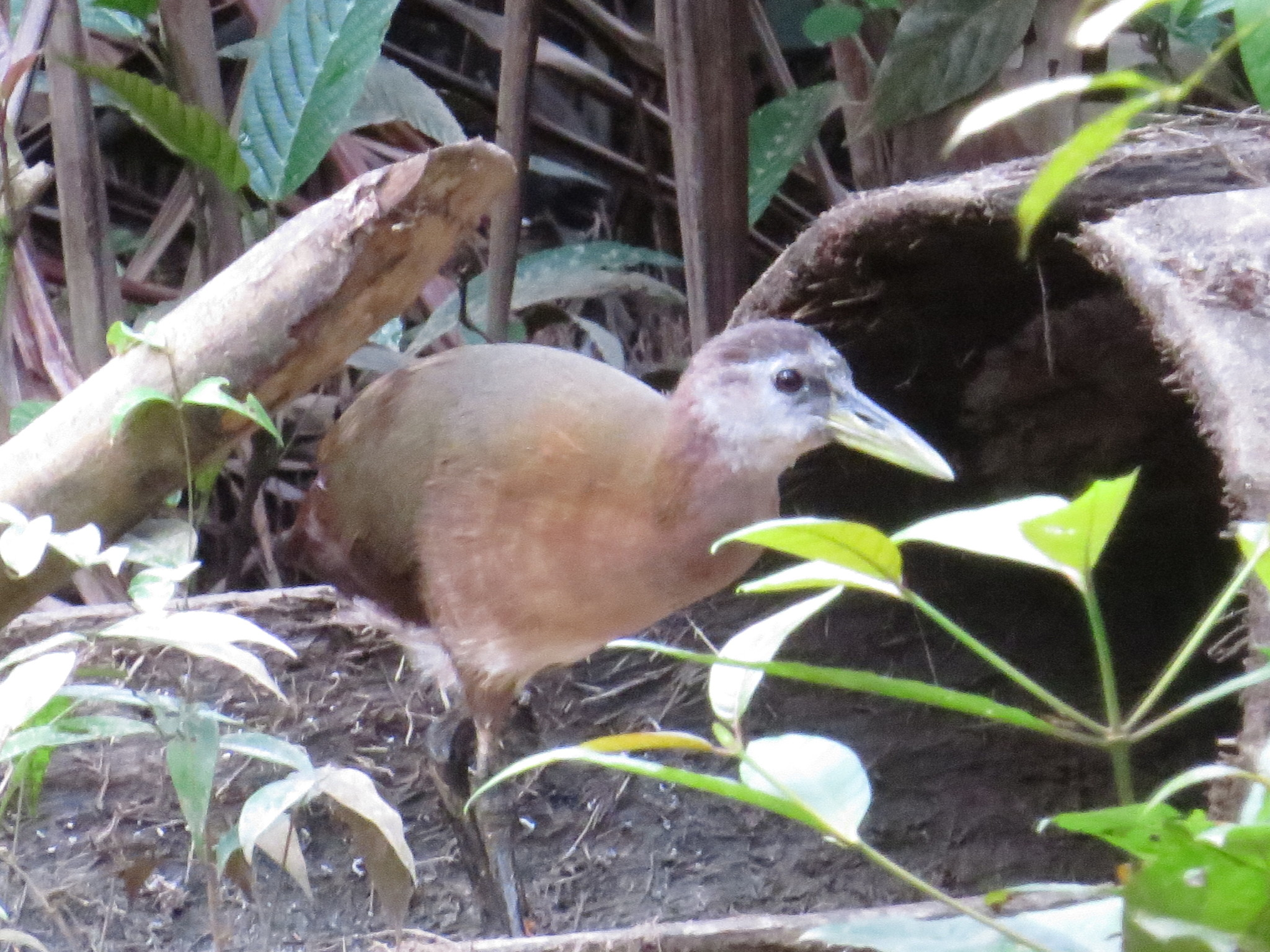
New Guinea flightless rail

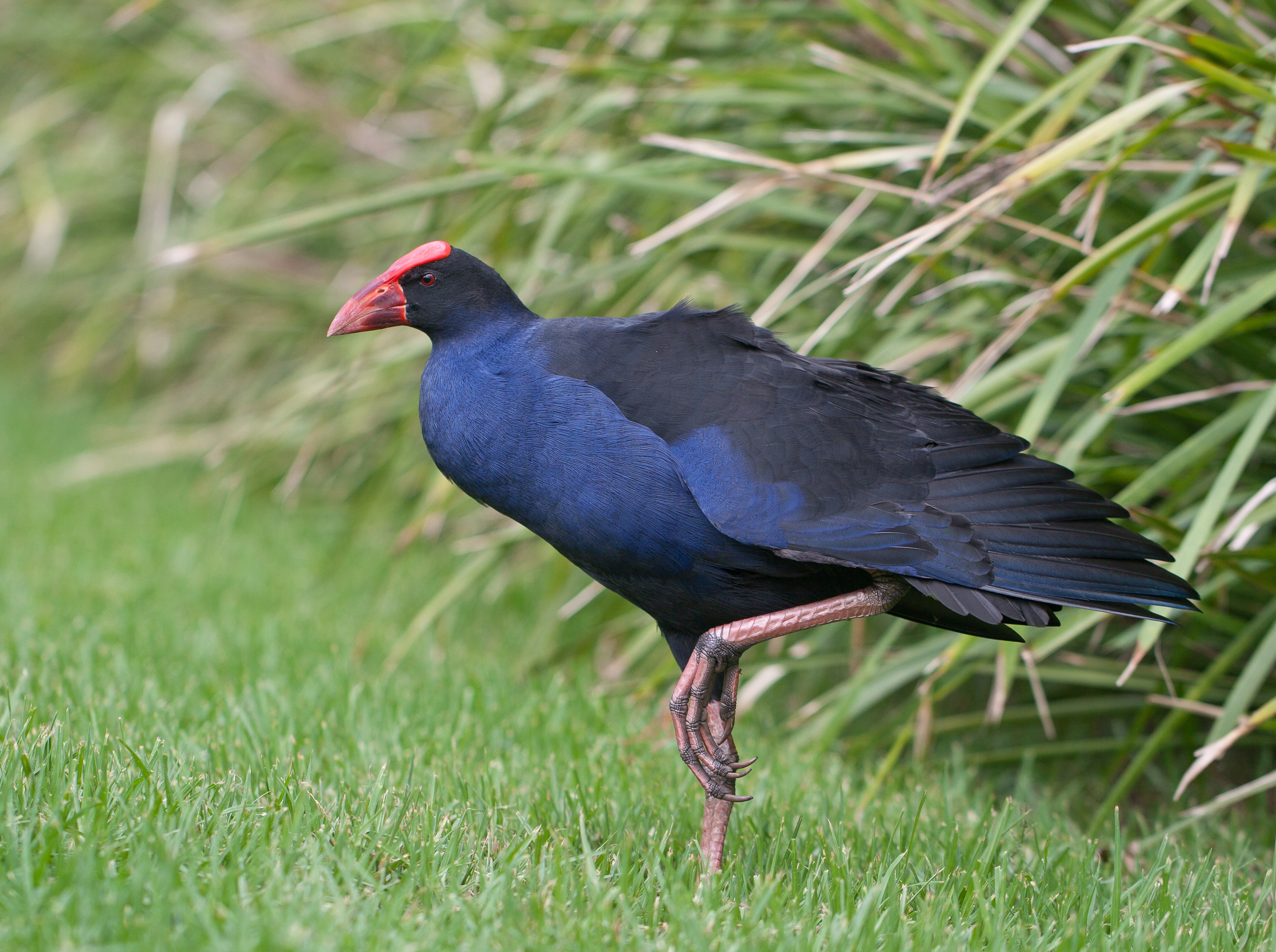
Australian swamphen

Rallidae is a large family of small to medium-sized birds which includes the rails, crakes, coots and gallinules. Typically they inhabit dense vegetation in damp environments near lakes, swamps or rivers. In general they are shy and secretive birds, making them difficult to observe. Most species have strong legs and long toes which are well adapted to soft uneven surfaces. They tend to have short, rounded wings and to be weak fliers.

- Lewin's rail, Lewinia pectoralis
- Bare-eyed rail, Gymnocrex plumbeiventris
- Chestnut rail, Gallirallus castaneoventris
- Buff-banded rail, Gallirallus philippensis
- New Britain rail, Gallirallus insignis (E)
- Woodford's rail, Gallirallus woodfordi
- Barred rail, Gallirallus torquatus
- Eurasian moorhen, Gallinula chloropus
- Dusky moorhen, Gallinula tenebrosa
- Eurasian coot, Fulica atra
- Black-backed swamphen, Porphyrio indicus
- Australasian swamphen, Porphyrio melanotus
- New Guinea flightless rail, Megacrex inepta
- Pale-vented bush-hen, Amaurornis moluccana
- White-browed crake, Poliolimnas cinereus
- Chestnut forest-rail, Rallina rubra
- White-striped forest-rail, Rallina leucospila
- Forbes's rail, Rallina forbesi
- Mayr's rail, Rallina mayri
- Red-necked crake, Rallina tricolor
- Baillon's crake, Zapornia pusilla
- Spotless crake, Zapornia tabuensis

== Cranes ==
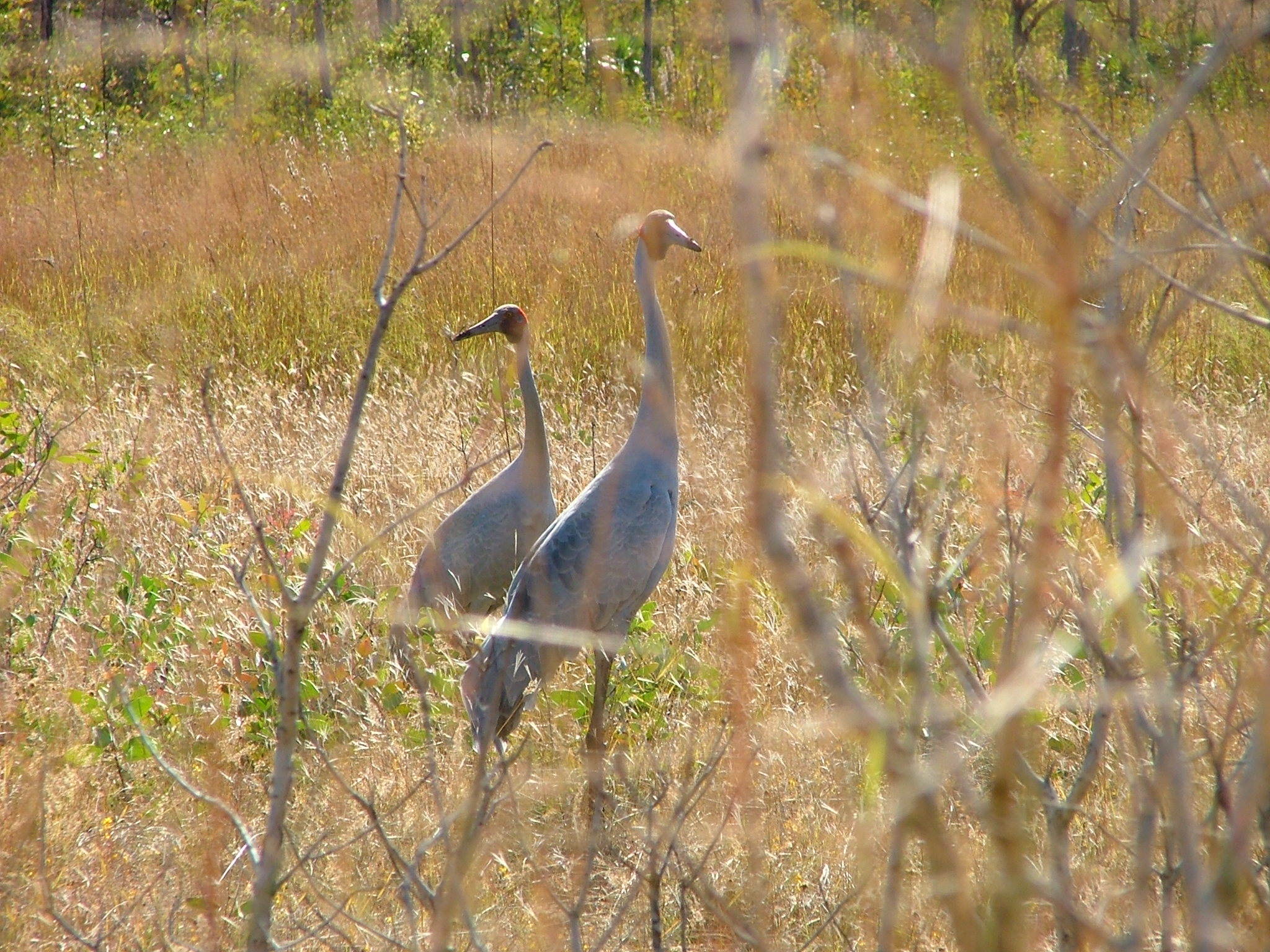
Brolga

Order: Gruiformes Family: Gruidae

Cranes are large, long-legged and long-necked birds. Unlike the similar-looking but unrelated herons, cranes fly with necks outstretched, not pulled back. Most have elaborate and noisy courting displays or "dances".

- Brolga, Antigone rubicunda

== Thick-knees ==
Order: Charadriiformes Family: Burhinidae

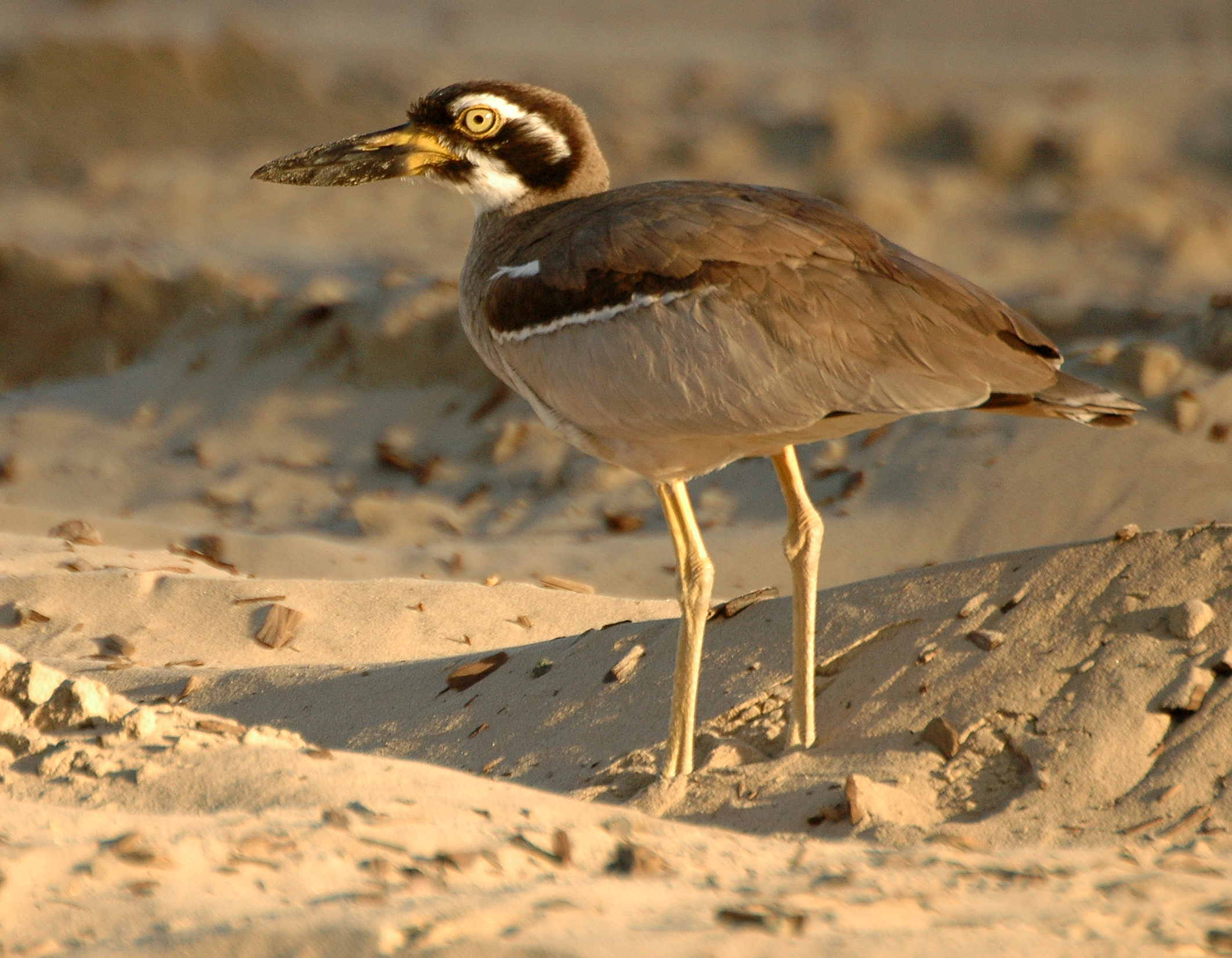
Beach thick-knee

The thick-knees are a group of largely tropical waders in the family Burhinidae. They are found worldwide within the tropical zone, with some species also breeding in temperate Europe and Australia. They are medium to large waders with strong black or yellow-black bills, large yellow eyes and cryptic plumage. Despite being classed as waders, most species have a preference for arid or semi-arid habitats.

- Bush thick-knee, Burhinus grallarius
- Beach thick-knee, Esacus magnirostris

== Stilts and avocets ==
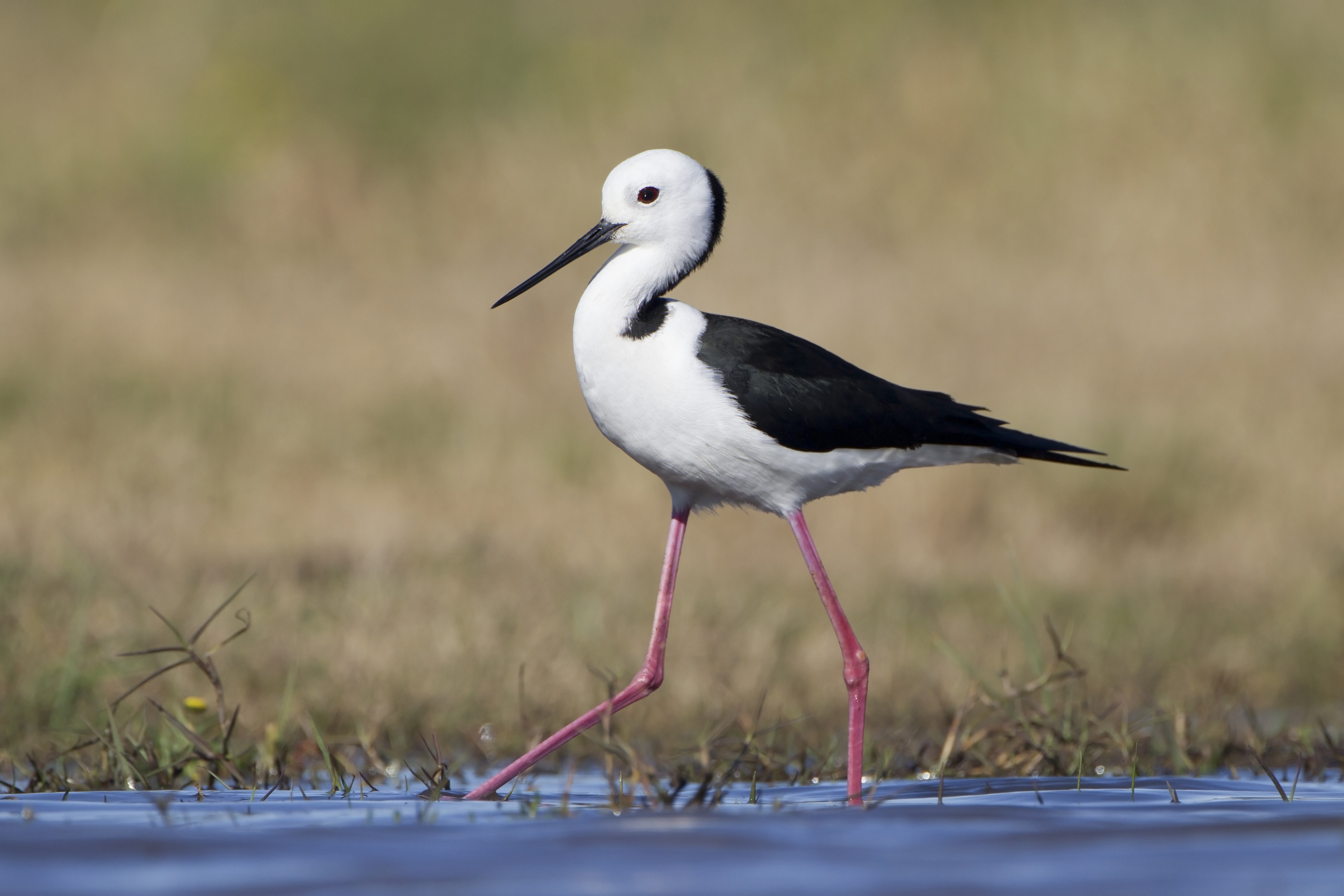
Pied stilt

Order: Charadriiformes Family: Recurvirostridae

Recurvirostridae is a family of large wading birds, which includes the avocets and stilts. The avocets have long legs and long up-curved bills. The stilts have extremely long legs and long, thin straight bills.

- Pied stilt, Himantopus leucocephalus
- Red-necked avocet, Recurvirostra novaehollandiae (A)

== Oystercatchers ==
Order: Charadriiformes Family: Haematopodidae

The oystercatchers are large and noisy plover-like birds, with strong bills used for smashing or prising open molluscs.

- Pied oystercatcher, Haematopus longirostris

== Plovers and lapwings ==
Order: Charadriiformes Family: Charadriidae

The family Charadriidae includes the plovers, dotterels and lapwings. They are small to medium-sized birds with compact bodies, short, thick necks and long, usually pointed, wings. They are found in open country worldwide, mostly in habitats near water.

- Black-bellied plover, Pluvialis squatarola
- American golden-plover, Pluvialis dominica
- Pacific golden-plover, Pluvialis fulva
- Masked lapwing, Vanellus miles
- Lesser sand-plover, Charadrius mongolus
- Greater sand-plover, Charadrius leschenaultii
- Red-capped plover, Charadrius ruficapillus (A)
- Common ringed plover, Charadrius hiaticula
- Little ringed plover, Charadrius dubius
- Oriental plover, Charadrius veredus
- Red-kneed dotterel, Erythrogonys cinctus
- Black-fronted dotterel, Elseyornis melanops (A)

== Jacanas ==
Order: Charadriiformes Family: Jacanidae

The Jacanas are a group of tropical waders in the family Jacanidae. They are found throughout the tropics. They are identifiable by their huge feet and claws which enable them to walk on floating vegetation in the shallow lakes that are their preferred habitat.

- Comb-crested jacana, Irediparra gallinacea

== Sandpipers and allies ==
Order: Charadriiformes Family: Scolopacidae

Scolopacidae is a large diverse family of small to medium-sized shorebirds including the sandpipers, curlews, godwits, shanks, tattlers, woodcocks, snipes, dowitchers and phalaropes. The majority of these species eat small invertebrates picked out of the mud or soil. Variation in length of legs and bills enables multiple species to feed in the same habitat, particularly on the coast, without direct competition for food.

- Bristle-thighed curlew, Numenius tahitiensis (A)
- Whimbrel, Numenius phaeopus
- Little curlew, Numenius minutus
- Far Eastern curlew, Numenius madagascariensis
- Bar-tailed godwit, Limosa lapponica
- Black-tailed godwit, Limosa limosa
- Ruddy turnstone, Arenaria interpres
- Great knot, Calidris tenuirostris
- Red knot, Calidris canutus
- Ruff, Calidris pugnax
- Broad-billed sandpiper, Calidris falcinellus
- Sharp-tailed sandpiper, Calidris acuminata
- Curlew sandpiper, Calidris ferruginea
- Long-toed stint, Calidris subminuta
- Red-necked stint, Calidris ruficollis
- Sanderling, Calidris alba
- Baird's sandpiper, Calidris bairdii (A)
- Little stint, Calidris minuta (A)
- Buff-breasted sandpiper, Calidris subruficollis
- Pectoral sandpiper, Calidris melanotos
- Asian dowitcher, Limnodromus semipalmatus
- Short-billed dowitcher, Limnodromus griseus (A)
- Long-billed dowitcher, Limnodromus scolopaceus (A)
- New Guinea woodcock, Scolopax rosenbergii
- Latham's snipe, Gallinago hardwickii
- Pin-tailed snipe, Gallinago stenura (A)
- Swinhoe's snipe, Gallinago megala
- Terek sandpiper, Xenus cinereus
- Red-necked phalarope, Phalaropus lobatus
- Common sandpiper, Actitis hypoleucos
- Green sandpiper, Tringa ochropus
- Gray-tailed tattler, Tringa brevipes
- Wandering tattler, Tringa incana
- Common greenshank, Tringa nebularia
- Marsh sandpiper, Tringa stagnatilis
- Wood sandpiper, Tringa glareola
- Common redshank, Tringa totanus

== Buttonquail ==
Order: Charadriiformes Family: Turnicidae

The buttonquail are small, drab, running birds which resemble the true quails. The female is the brighter of the sexes and initiates courtship. The male incubates the eggs and tends the young.

- Red-backed buttonquail, Turnix maculosa

== Pratincoles and coursers ==
Order: Charadriiformes Family: Glareolidae

Glareolidae is a family of wading birds comprising the pratincoles, which have short legs, long pointed wings and long forked tails, and the coursers, which have long legs, short wings and long, pointed bills which curve downwards.

- Australian pratincole, Stiltia isabella
- Oriental pratincole, Glareola maldivarum

== Skuas and jaegers ==
Order: Charadriiformes Family: Stercorariidae

The family Stercorariidae are, in general, medium to large birds, typically with grey or brown plumage, often with white markings on the wings. They nest on the ground in temperate and arctic regions and are long-distance migrants.

- South polar skua, Stercorarius maccormicki (A)
- Pomarine jaeger, Stercorarius pomarinus
- Parasitic jaeger, Stercorarius parasiticus
- Long-tailed jaeger, Stercorarius longicaudus

== Gulls, terns, and skimmers ==
Order: Charadriiformes Family: Laridae

Laridae is a family of medium to large seabirds, the gulls, terns, and skimmers. Gulls are typically grey or white, often with black markings on the head or wings. They have stout, longish bills and webbed feet. Terns are a group of generally medium to large seabirds typically with grey or white plumage, often with black markings on the head. Most terns hunt fish by diving but some pick insects off the surface of fresh water. Terns are generally long-lived birds, with several species known to live in excess of 30 years.

- Silver gull, Chroicocephalus novaehollandiae
- Black-headed gull, Chroicocephalus ridibundus
- Black-tailed gull, Larus crassirostris
- Brown noddy, Anous stolidus
- Black noddy, Anous minutus
- Lesser noddy, Anous tenuirostris (A)
- White tern, Gygis alba
- Sooty tern, Onychoprion fuscatus
- Gray-backed tern, Onychoprion lunatus (A)
- Bridled tern, Onychoprion anaethetus
- Aleutian tern, Onychoprion aleuticus (A)
- Little tern, Sternula albifrons
- Gull-billed tern, Gelochelidon nilotica
- Caspian tern, Hydroprogne caspia
- White-winged tern, Chlidonias leucopterus
- Whiskered tern, Chlidonias hybrida
- Roseate tern, Sterna dougallii
- Black-naped tern, Sterna sumatrana
- Common tern, Sterna hirundo
- Great crested tern, Thalasseus bergii
- Lesser crested tern, Thalasseus bengalensis

== Tropicbirds ==
Order: Phaethontiformes Family: Phaethontidae

Tropicbirds are slender white birds of tropical oceans, with exceptionally long central tail feathers. Their heads and long wings have black markings.

- White-tailed tropicbird, Phaethon lepturus
- Red-tailed tropicbird, Phaethon rubricauda

== Albatrosses ==
Order: Procellariiformes Family: Diomedeidae

The albatrosses are a family of large seabird found across the Southern and North Pacific Oceans. The largest are among the largest flying birds in the world.

- Laysan albatross, Phoebastria immutabilis (A)

== Southern storm-petrels ==
Order: Procellariiformes Family: Oceanitidae

The southern storm-petrels are relatives of the petrels and are the smallest seabirds. They feed on planktonic crustaceans and small fish picked from the surface, typically while hovering. The flight is fluttering and sometimes bat-like.

- Wilson's storm-petrel, Oceanites oceanicus
- White-faced storm-petrel, Pelagodroma marina (A)
- White-bellied storm-petrel, Fregetta grallaria
- Black-bellied storm-petrel, Fregetta tropica

== Northern storm-petrels ==
Order: Procellariiformes Family: Hydrobatidae

Though the members of this family are similar in many respects to the southern storm-petrels, including their general appearance and habits, there are enough genetic differences to warrant their placement in a separate family.

- Leach's storm-petrel, Hydrobates leucorhous
- Band-rumped storm-petrel, Hydrobates castro (A)
- Matsudaira's storm-petrel, Hydrobates matsudairae

== Shearwaters and petrels ==
Order: Procellariiformes Family: Procellariidae

The procellariids are the main group of medium-sized "true petrels", characterised by united nostrils with medium septum and a long outer functional primary.

- Southern giant petrel, Macronectes giganteus
- Kermadec petrel, Pterodroma neglecta
- Herald petrel, Pterodroma heraldica (A)
- Providence petrel, Pterodroma solandri (A)
- Gould's petrel, Pterodroma leucoptera
- Collared petrel, Pterodroma brevipes
- Fairy prion, Pachyptila turtur
- Bulwer's petrel, Bulweria bulwerii (A)
- Tahiti petrel, Pseudobulweria rostrata
- Beck's petrel, Pseudobulweria becki
- Streaked shearwater, Calonectris leucomelas
- Flesh-footed shearwater, Ardenna carneipes
- Wedge-tailed shearwater, Ardenna pacificus
- Sooty shearwater, Ardenna griseus
- Short-tailed shearwater, Ardenna tenuirostris
- Christmas shearwater, Puffinus nativitatis
- Tropical shearwater, Puffinus bailloni
- Heinroth's shearwater, Puffinus heinrothi

== Storks ==
Order: Ciconiiformes Family: Ciconiidae

Storks are large, long-legged, long-necked, wading birds with long, stout bills. Storks are mute, but bill-clattering is an important mode of communication at the nest. Their nests can be large and may be reused for many years. Many species are migratory.

- Black-necked stork, Ephippiorhynchus asiaticus

== Frigatebirds ==
Order: Suliformes Family: Fregatidae

Frigatebirds are large seabirds usually found over tropical oceans. They are large, black-and-white or completely black, with long wings and deeply forked tails. The males have coloured inflatable throat pouches. They do not swim or walk and cannot take off from a flat surface. Having the largest wingspan-to-body-weight ratio of any bird, they are essentially aerial, able to stay aloft for more than a week.

- Lesser frigatebird, Fregata ariel
- Great frigatebird, Fregata minor

== Boobies and gannets ==
Order: Suliformes Family: Sulidae

The sulids comprise the gannets and boobies. Both groups are medium to large coastal seabirds that plunge-dive for fish.

- Masked booby, Sula dactylatra
- Brown booby, Sula leucogaster
- Red-footed booby, Sula sula
- Abbott's booby, Papasula abbotti (A)

== Anhingas ==
Order: Suliformes Family: Anhingidae

Anhingas or darters are often called "snake-birds" because of their long thin necks, which gives a snake-like appearance when they swim with their bodies submerged. The males have black and dark-brown plumage, an erectile crest on the nape and a larger bill than the female. The females have much paler plumage especially on the neck and underparts. The darters have completely webbed feet and their legs are short and set far back on the body. Their plumage is somewhat permeable, like that of cormorants, and they spread their wings to dry after diving.

- Oriental darter, Anhinga melanogaster
- Australasian darter, Anhinga novaehollandiae

== Cormorants and shags ==
Order: Suliformes Family: Phalacrocoracidae

Phalacrocoracidae is a family of medium to large coastal, fish-eating seabirds that includes cormorants and shags. Plumage colouration varies, with the majority having mainly dark plumage, some species being black-and-white and a few being colourful.

- Little pied cormorant, Microcarbo melanoleucos
- Great cormorant, Phalacrocorax carbo
- Little black cormorant, Phalacrocorax sulcirostris
- Pied cormorant, Phalacrocorax varius

== Pelicans ==
Order: Pelecaniformes Family: Pelecanidae

Pelicans are large water birds with a distinctive pouch under their beak. As with other members of the order Pelecaniformes, they have webbed feet with four toes.

- Australian pelican, Pelecanus conspicillatus

== Herons, egrets, and bitterns ==
Order: Pelecaniformes Family: Ardeidae

The family Ardeidae contains the bitterns, herons and egrets. Herons and egrets are medium to large wading birds with long necks and legs. Bitterns tend to be shorter necked and more wary. Members of Ardeidae fly with their necks retracted, unlike other long-necked birds such as storks, ibises and spoonbills.

- Yellow bittern, Ixobrychus sinensis
- Black-backed bittern, Ixobrychus dubius
- Black bittern, Ixobrychus flavicollis
- Forest bittern, Zonerodius heliosylus
- Pacific heron, Ardea pacifica
- Great-billed heron, Ardea sumatrana
- Great egret, Ardea alba
- Intermediate egret, Ardea intermedia
- White-faced heron, Egretta novaehollandiae
- Little egret, Egretta garzetta
- Pacific reef-heron, Egretta sacra
- Pied heron, Egretta picata
- Cattle egret, Bubulcus ibis
- Striated heron, Butorides striata
- Nankeen night-heron, Nycticorax caledonicus

== Ibises and spoonbills ==
Order: Pelecaniformes Family: Threskiornithidae

Threskiornithidae is a family of large terrestrial and wading birds which includes the ibises and spoonbills. They have long, broad wings with 11 primary and about 20 secondary feathers. They are strong fliers and despite their size and weight, very capable soarers.

- Glossy ibis, Plegadis falcinellus
- African sacred ibis, Threskiornis aethiopicus
- Australian ibis, Threskiornis moluccus
- Straw-necked ibis, Threskiornis spinicollis
- Royal spoonbill, Platalea regia
- Yellow-billed spoonbill, Platalea flavipes

== Osprey ==
Order: Accipitriformes Family: Pandionidae

The family Pandionidae contains only one species, the osprey. The osprey is a medium-large raptor which is a specialist fish-eater with a worldwide distribution.

- Osprey, Pandion haliaetus

== Hawks, eagles, and kites ==
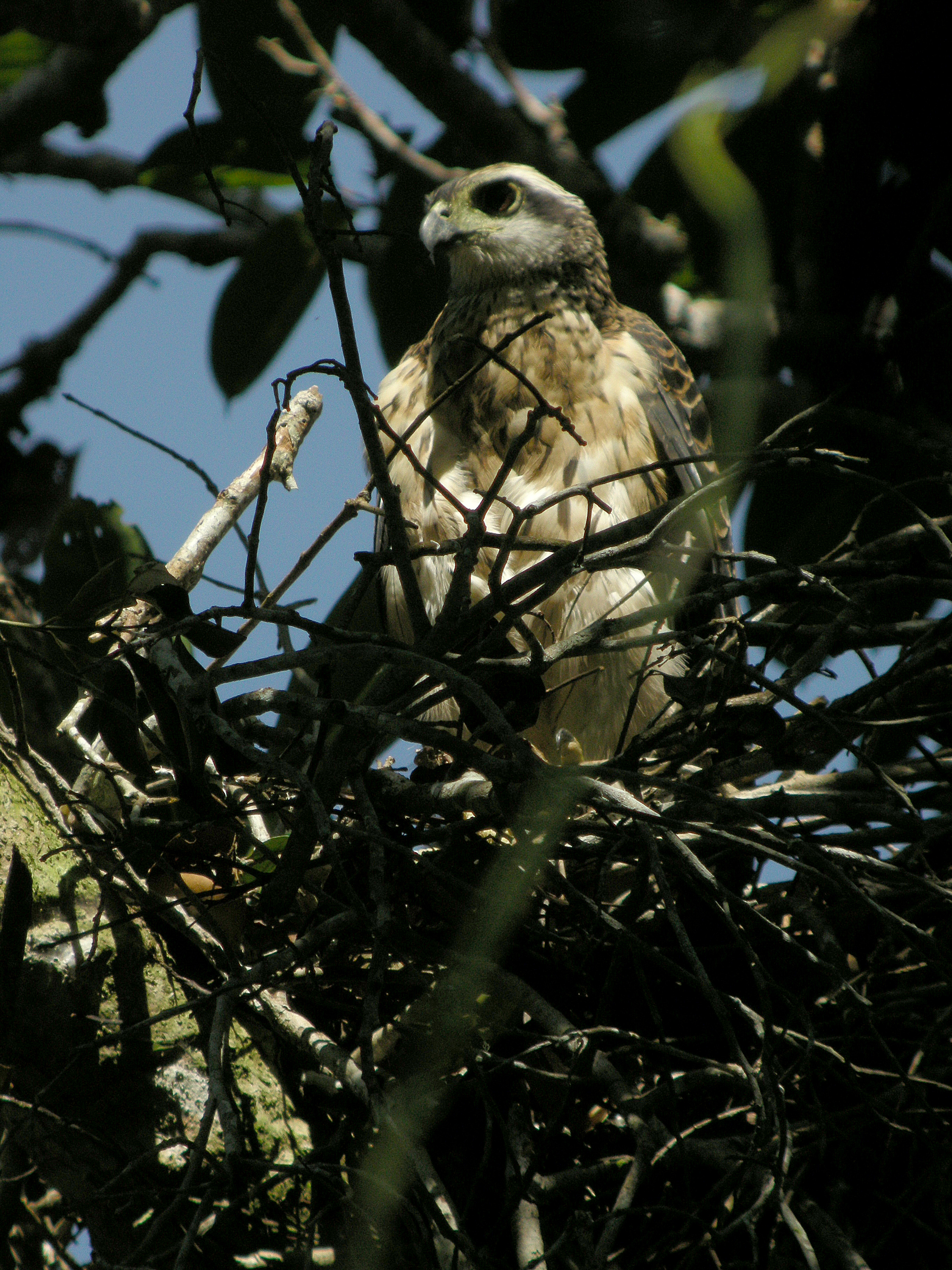
Doria's goshawk

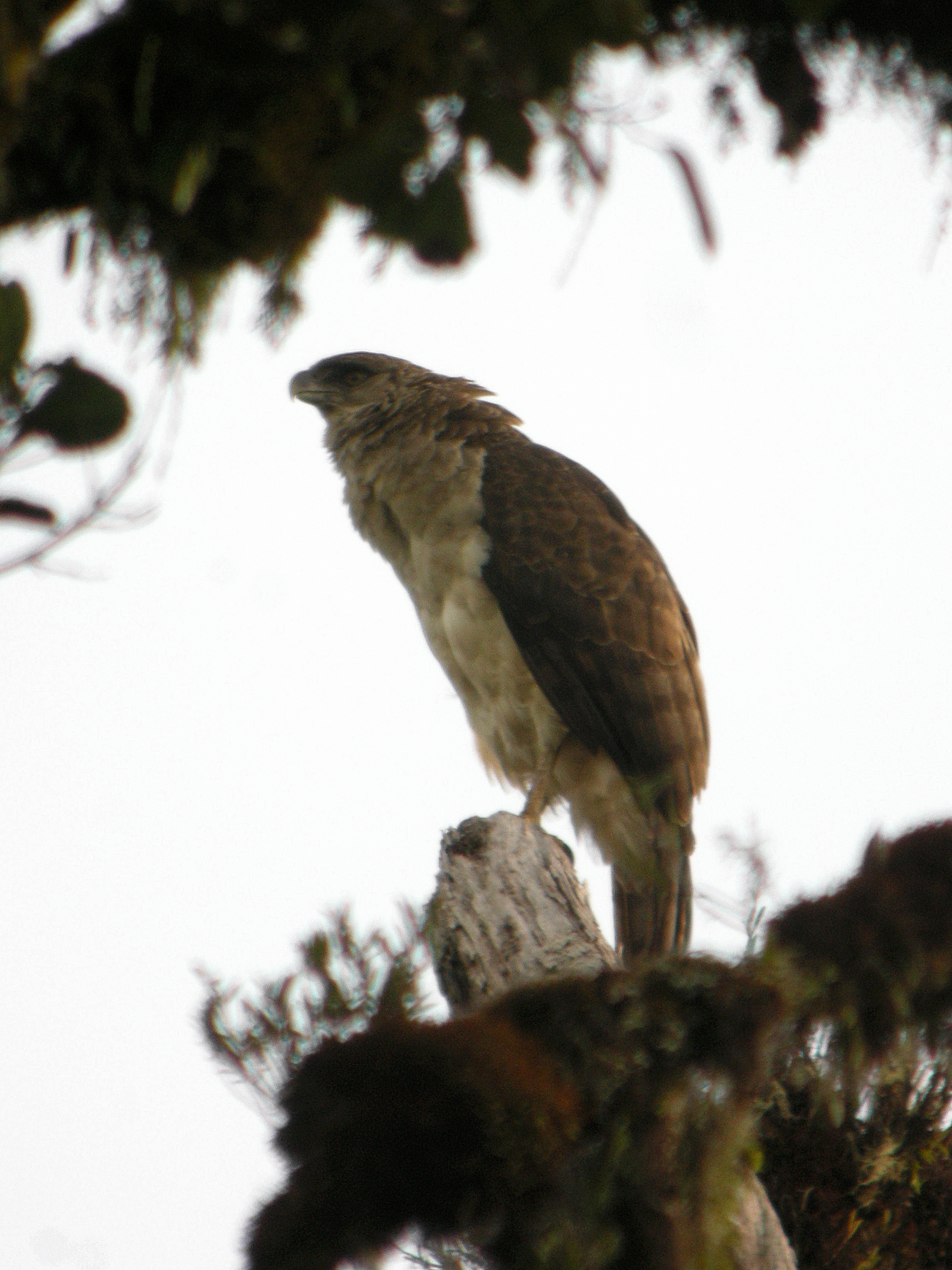
New Guinea eagle

Order: Accipitriformes Family: Accipitridae

Accipitridae is a family of birds of prey, which includes hawks, eagles, kites, harriers and Old World vultures. These birds have powerful hooked beaks for tearing flesh from their prey, strong legs, powerful talons and keen eyesight.

- Black-winged kite, Elanus caeruleus
- Long-tailed honey-buzzard, Henicopernis longicauda
- Black honey-buzzard, Henicopernis infuscatus (E)
- Pacific baza, Aviceda subcristata
- Bat hawk, Macheiramphus alcinus
- Papuan eagle, Harpyopsis novaeguineae
- Pygmy eagle, Hieraaetus weiskei
- Gurney's eagle, Aquila gurneyi
- Wedge-tailed eagle, Aquila audax
- Papuan marsh-harrier, Circus spilothorax
- Swamp harrier, Circus approximans
- Pied harrier, Circus melanoleucos
- Chinese sparrowhawk, Accipiter soloensis
- Variable goshawk, Accipiter hiogaster
- Gray goshawk, Accipiter novaehollandiae
- Brown goshawk, Accipiter fasciatus
- Black-mantled goshawk, Accipiter melanochlamys
- Pied goshawk, Accipiter albogularis
- Slaty-mantled goshawk, Accipiter luteoschistaceus (E)
- Imitator sparrowhawk, Accipiter imitator
- Gray-headed goshawk, Accipiter poliocephalus
- New Britain goshawk, Accipiter princeps (E)
- Collared sparrowhawk, Accipiter cirrocephalus
- New Britain sparrowhawk, Accipiter brachyurus (E)
- Meyer's goshawk, Accipiter meyerianus
- Chestnut-shouldered goshawk, Erythrotriorchis buergersi
- Doria's goshawk, Megatriorchis doriae
- Black kite, Milvus migrans
- Whistling kite, Haliastur sphenurus
- Brahminy kite, Haliastur indus
- White-bellied sea-eagle, Haliaeetus leucogaster
- Sanford's sea-eagle, Haliaeetus sanfordi

== Barn-owls ==
Order: Strigiformes Family: Tytonidae

Barn-owls are medium to large owls with large heads and characteristic heart-shaped faces. They have long strong legs with powerful talons.

- Sooty owl, Tyto tenebricosa
- Australian masked-owl, Tyto novaehollandiae
- Golden masked-owl, Tyto aurantia (E)
- Manus masked-owl, Tyto manusi (E)
- Australasian grass-owl, Tyto longimembris
- Eastern barn owl, Tyto javanica

== Owls ==
Order: Strigiformes Family: Strigidae

The typical owls are small to large solitary nocturnal birds of prey. They have large forward-facing eyes and ears, a hawk-like beak and a conspicuous circle of feathers around each eye called a facial disk.

- Fearful owl, Nesasio solomonensis
- Rufous owl, Ninox rufa
- Barking owl, Ninox connivens
- Southern boobook, Ninox boobook
- Morepork, Ninox novaeseelandiae
- Papuan boobook, Ninox theomacha
- Manus boobook, Ninox meeki (E)
- Bismarck boobook, Ninox variegata (E)
- New Britain boobook, Ninox odiosa (E)
- Solomons boobook, Ninox jacquinoti
- Papuan owl, Uroglaux dimorpha

== Hornbills ==
Order: Bucerotiformes Family: Bucerotidae

Hornbills are a group of birds whose bill is shaped like a cow's horn, but without a twist, sometimes with a casque on the upper mandible. Frequently, the bill is brightly coloured.

- Blyth's hornbill, Rhyticeros plicatus

== Kingfishers ==
Order: Coraciiformes Family: Alcedinidae

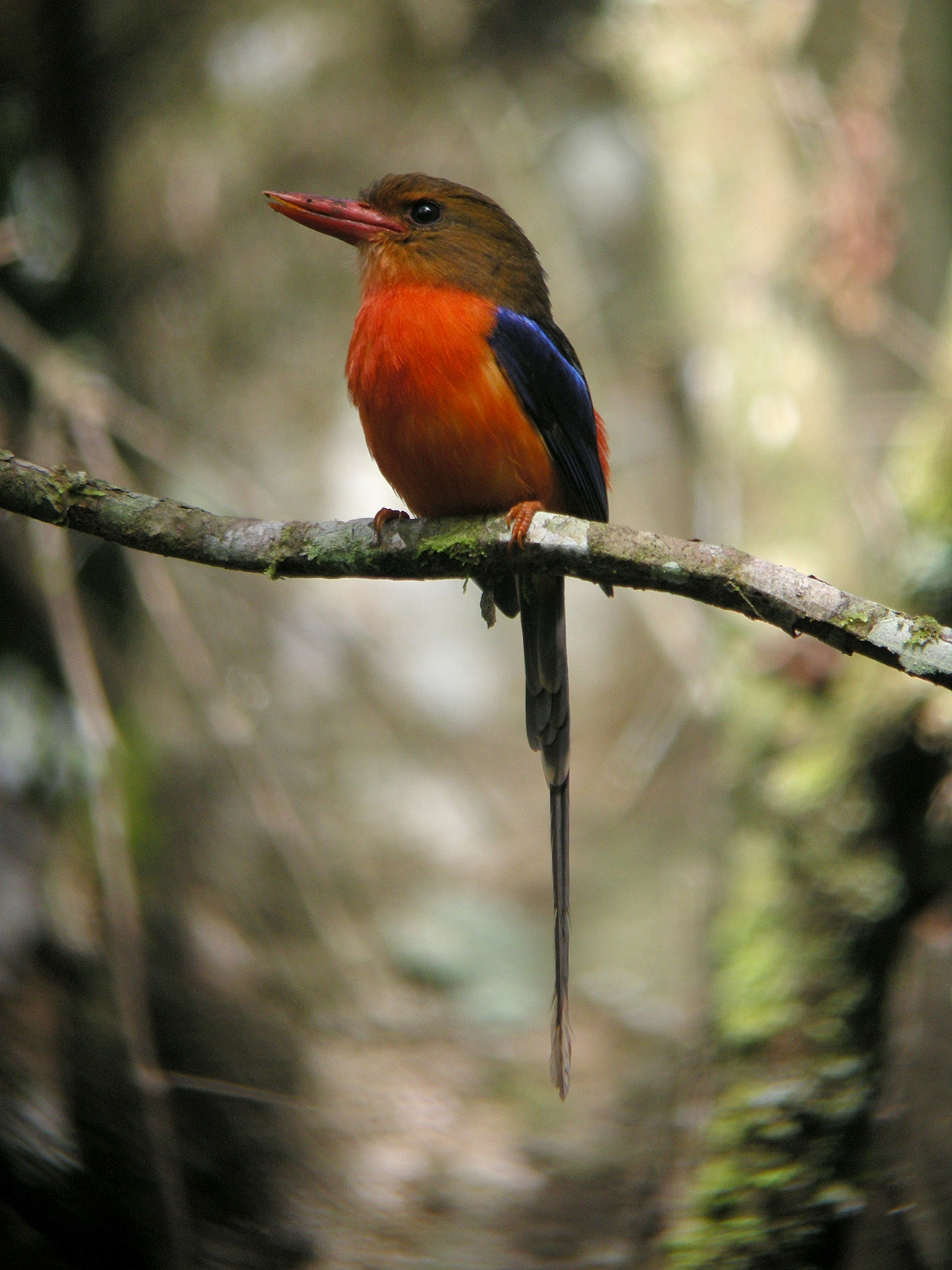
Brown-headed paradise-kingfisher

Kingfishers are medium-sized birds with large heads, long pointed bills, short legs, and stubby tails.

- Common kingfisher, Alcedo atthis
- Azure kingfisher, Ceyx azureus
- Bismarck kingfisher, Ceyx websteri (E)
- Little kingfisher, Ceyx pusillus
- Papuan dwarf-kingfisher, Ceyx solitarius
- Manus dwarf-kingfisher, Ceyx dispar (E)
- New Ireland dwarf-kingfisher, Ceyx mulcatus (E)
- New Britain dwarf-kingfisher, Ceyx sacerdotis (E)
- North Solomons dwarf-kingfisher, Ceyx meeki
- Blue-winged kookaburra, Dacelo leachii
- Spangled kookaburra, Dacelo tyro
- Rufous-bellied kookaburra, Dacelo gaudichaud
- Shovel-billed kookaburra, Clytoceyx rex
- Blue-black kingfisher, Todirhamphus nigrocyaneus
- Forest kingfisher, Todirhamphus macleayii
- New Britain kingfisher, Todirhamphus albonotatus (E)
- Ultramarine kingfisher, Todirhamphus leucopygius
- Pohnpei kingfisher, Todirhamphus reichenbachii (A)
- Colonist kingfisher, Todirhamphus colonus (E)
- Torresian kingfisher, Todirhamphus sordidus
- Sacred kingfisher, Todirhamphus sanctus
- Collared kingfisher, Todirhamphus chloris
- Beach kingfisher, Todirhamphus saurophaga
- Melanesian kingfisher, Todirhamphus tristrami
- Hook-billed kingfisher, Melidora macrorrhina
- Moustached kingfisher, Actenoides bougainvillei
- Yellow-billed kingfisher, Syma torotoro
- Mountain kingfisher, Syma megarhyncha
- Little paradise-kingfisher, Tanysiptera hydrocharis
- Common paradise-kingfisher, Tanysiptera galatea
- Red-breasted paradise-kingfisher, Tanysiptera nympha
- Brown-headed paradise-kingfisher, Tanysiptera danae (E)
- Buff-breasted paradise-kingfisher, Tanysiptera sylvia
- Black-capped paradise-kingfisher, Tanysiptera nigriceps (E)

== Bee-eaters ==
Order: Coraciiformes Family: Meropidae

The bee-eaters are a group of near passerine birds in the family Meropidae. Most species are found in Africa but others occur in southern Europe, Madagascar, Australia and New Guinea. They are characterised by richly coloured plumage, slender bodies and usually elongated central tail feathers. All are colourful and have long downturned bills and pointed wings, which give them a swallow-like appearance when seen from afar.

- Blue-tailed bee-eater, Merops philippinus
- Rainbow bee-eater, Merops ornatus

== Rollers ==
Order: Coraciiformes Family: Coraciidae

Rollers resemble crows in size and build, but are more closely related to the kingfishers and bee-eaters. They share the colourful appearance of those groups with blues and browns predominating. The two inner front toes are connected, but the outer toe is not.

- Dollarbird, Eurystomus orientalis

== Falcons and caracaras ==
Order: Falconiformes Family: Falconidae

Falconidae is a family of diurnal birds of prey. They differ from hawks, eagles and kites in that they kill with their beaks instead of their talons.

- Collared falconet, Microhierax caerulescens (A)
- Spotted kestrel, Falco moluccensis (A)
- Nankeen kestrel, Falco cenchroides
- Oriental hobby, Falco severus
- Australian hobby, Falco longipennis
- Brown falcon, Falco berigora
- Gray falcon, Falco hypoleucos (A)
- Peregrine falcon, Falco peregrinus

== Cockatoos ==
Order: Psittaciformes Family: Cacatuidae

The cockatoos share many features with other parrots including the characteristic curved beak shape and a zygodactyl foot, with two forward toes and two backwards toes. They differ, however in a number of characteristics, including the often spectacular movable headcrest.

- Palm cockatoo, Probosciger aterrimus
- Little corella, Cacatua sanguinea
- Ducorps's cockatoo, Cacatua ducorpsii
- Sulphur-crested cockatoo, Cacatua galerita
- Blue-eyed cockatoo, Cacatua ophthalmica (E)

== Old World parrots ==
Order: Psittaciformes Family: Psittaculidae

Characteristic features of parrots include a strong curved bill, an upright stance, strong legs, and clawed zygodactyl feet. Many parrots are vividly coloured, and some are multi-coloured. In size they range from 8 cm (3.1 in) to 1 m (3.3 ft) in length. Old World parrots are found from Africa east across south and southeast Asia and Oceania to Australia and New Zealand.

- Pesquet's parrot, Psittrichas fulgidus
- Yellow-capped pygmy-parrot, Micropsitta keiensis
- Buff-faced pygmy-parrot, Micropsitta pusio (E)
- Red-breasted pygmy-parrot, Micropsitta bruijnii
- Meek's pygmy-parrot, Micropsitta meeki (E)
- Finsch's pygmy-parrot, Micropsitta finschii
- Papuan king-parrot, Alisterus chloropterus
- Red-winged parrot, Aprosmictus erythropterus
- Papuan eclectus, Eclectus polychloros
- Red-cheeked parrot, Geoffroyus geoffroyi
- Blue-collared parrot, Geoffroyus simplex
- Singing parrot, Geoffroyus heteroclitus
- Painted tiger-parrot, Psittacella picta
- Brehm's tiger-parrot, Psittacella brehmii
- Modest tiger-parrot, Psittacella modesta
- Madarasz's tiger-parrot, Psittacella madaraszi
- Yellow-billed lorikeet, Neopsittacus musschenbroekii
- Orange-billed lorikeet, Neopsittacus pullicauda
- Orange-breasted fig-parrot, Cyclopsitta gulielmitertii
- Double-eyed fig-parrot, Cyclopsitta diophthalma
- Large fig-parrot, Psittaculirostris desmarestii
- Edwards's fig-parrot, Psittaculirostris edwardsii
- Plum-faced lorikeet, Oreopsittacus arfaki
- Pygmy lorikeet, Charminetta wilhelminae
- Red-fronted lorikeet, Hypocharmosyna rubronotata
- Red-flanked lorikeet, Hypocharmosyna placentis
- Fairy lorikeet, Charmosynopsis pulchella
- Striated lorikeet, Synorhacma multistriata
- Duchess lorikeet, Charmosynoides margarethae
- Red-chinned lorikeet, Vini rubrigularis (E)
- Meek's lorikeet, Vini meeki
- Josephine's lorikeet, Charmosyna josefinae
- Stella's lorikeet, Charmosyna stellae
- Brown lory, Chalcopsitta duivenbodei
- Yellowish-streaked lory, Chalcopsitta scintillata
- Purple-bellied lory, Lorius hypoinochrous (E)
- Black-capped lory, Lorius lory
- White-naped lory, Lorius albidinuchus (E)
- Goldie's lorikeet, Glossoptila goldiei
- Dusky lory, Pseudeos fuscata
- Cardinal lory, Pseudeos cardinalis
- Coconut lorikeet, Trichoglossus haematodus
- Rainbow lorikeet, Trichoglossus moluccanus
- Papuan hanging-parrot, Loriculus aurantiifrons
- Green-fronted hanging-parrot, Loriculus tener (E)

== Pittas ==
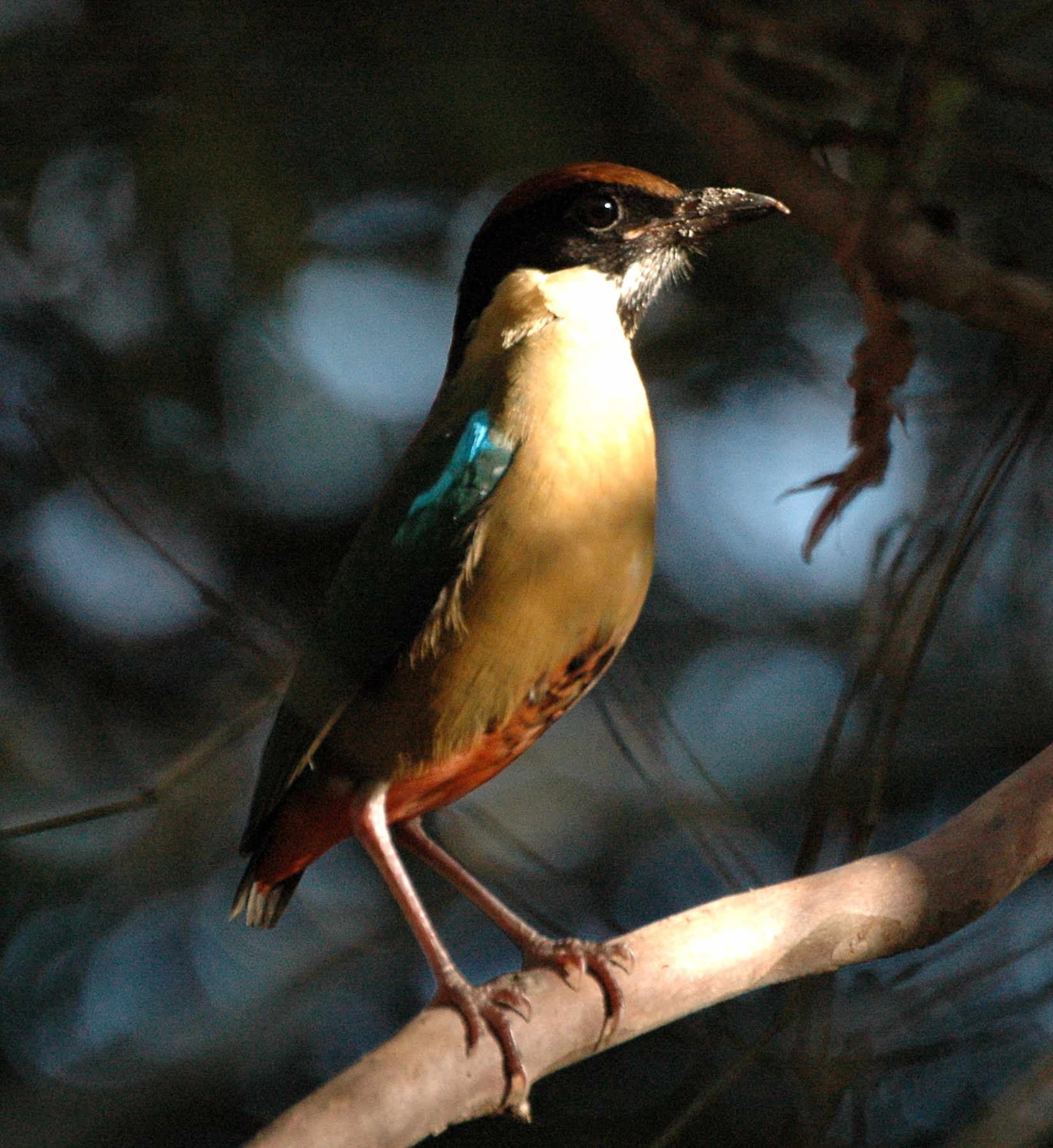
Noisy pitta

Order: Passeriformes Family: Pittidae

Pittas are medium-sized by passerine standards and are stocky, with fairly long, strong legs, short tails and stout bills. Many are brightly coloured. They spend the majority of their time on wet forest floors, eating snails, insects and similar invertebrates.

- Papuan pitta, Erythropitta macklotii
- Bismarck pitta, Erythropitta novaehibernicae (E)
- Louisiade pitta, Erythropitta meeki (E)
- Hooded pitta, Pitta sordida
- Noisy pitta, Pitta versicolor
- Black-faced pitta, Pitta anerythra
- Superb pitta, Pitta superba (E)

== Bowerbirds ==
Order: Passeriformes Family: Ptilonorhynchidae

The bowerbirds are small to medium-sized passerine birds. The males notably build a bower to attract a mate. Depending on the species, the bower ranges from a circle of cleared earth with a small pile of twigs in the center to a complex and highly decorated structure of sticks and leaves.

- White-eared catbird, Ailuroedus buccoides
- Ochre-breasted catbird, Ailuroedus stonii
- Tan-capped catbird, Ailuroedus geislerorum
- Huon catbird, Ailuroedus astigmaticus (E)
- Black-capped catbird, Ailuroedus melanocephalus (E)
- Northern catbird, Ailuroedus jobiensis
- Black-eared catbird, Ailuroedus melanotis
- Archbold's bowerbird, Archboldia papuensis
- MacGregor's bowerbird, Amblyornis macgregoriae
- Streaked bowerbird, Amblyornis subalaris (E)
- Masked bowerbird, Sericulus aureus
- Flame bowerbird, Sericulus ardens
- Fire-maned bowerbird, Sericulus bakeri (E)
- Yellow-breasted bowerbird, Chlamydera lauterbachi
- Fawn-breasted bowerbird, Chlamydera cerviniventris

== Australasian treecreepers ==
Order: Passeriformes Family: Climacteridae

The Climacteridae are medium-small, mostly brown-coloured birds with patterning on their underparts. They are endemic to Australia and New Guinea.

- Papuan treecreeper, Cormobates placens

== Fairywrens ==
Order: Passeriformes Family: Maluridae

Maluridae is a family of small, insectivorous passerine birds endemic to Australia and New Guinea. They are socially monogamous and sexually promiscuous, meaning that although they form pairs between one male and one female, each partner will mate with other individuals and even assist in raising the young from such pairings.

- Wallace's fairywren, Sipodotus wallacii
- Orange-crowned fairywren, Clytomyias insignis
- Broad-billed fairywren, Chenorhamphus grayi
- Campbell's fairywren, Chenorhamphus campbelli (E)
- Emperor fairywren, Malurus cyanocephalus
- White-shouldered fairywren, Malurus alboscapulatus

== Honeyeaters ==
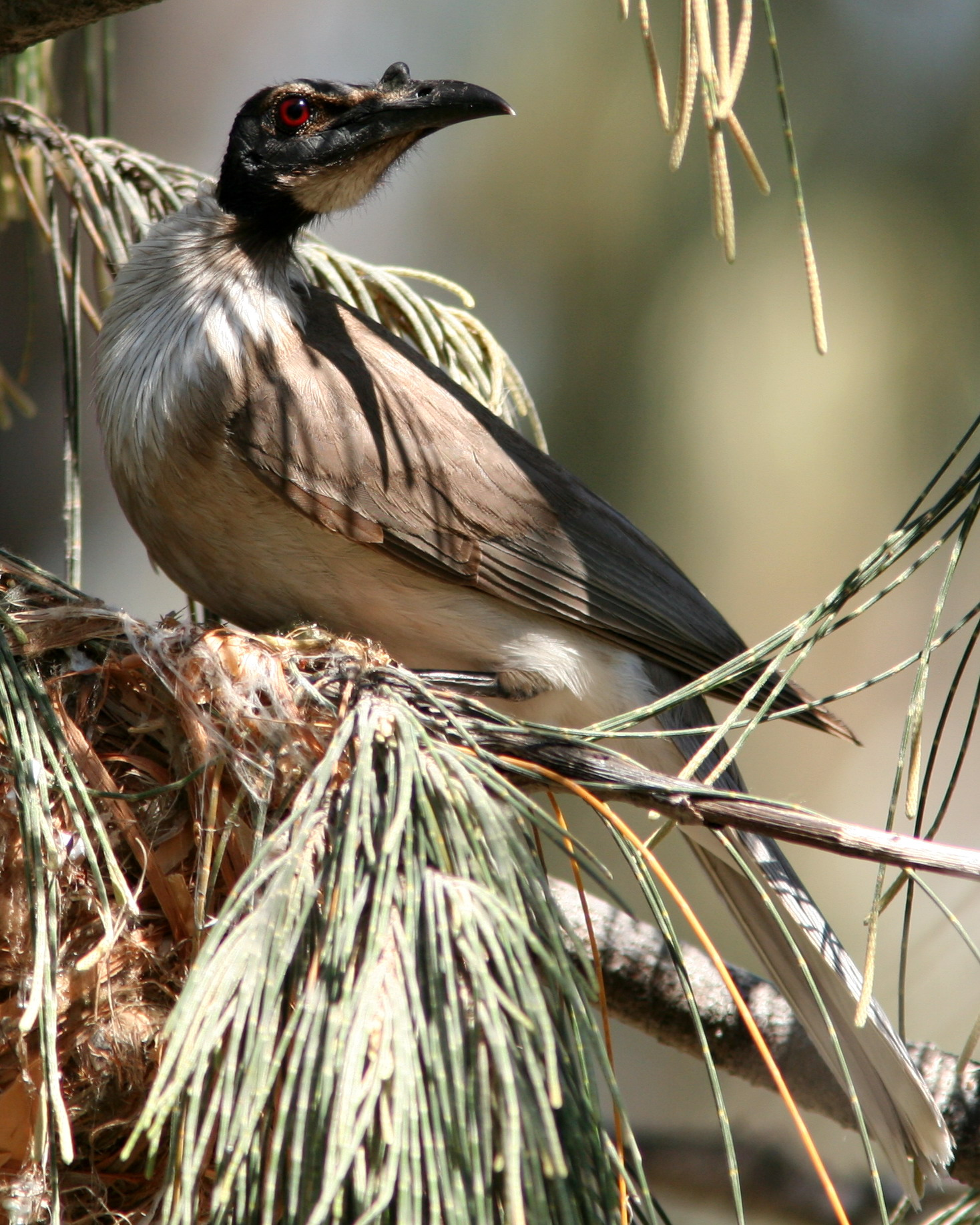
Noisy friarbird

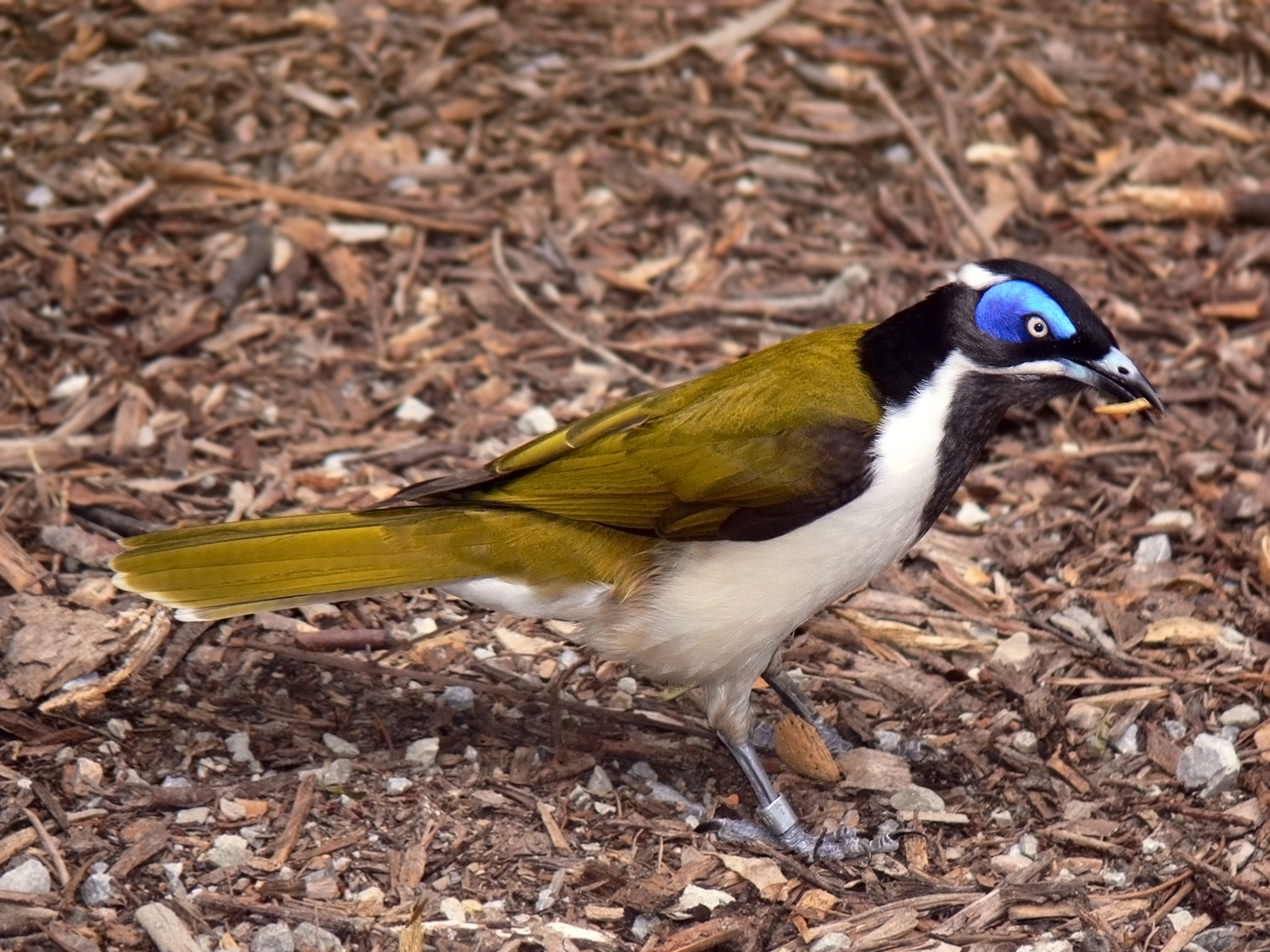
Blue-faced honeyeater

Order: Passeriformes Family: Meliphagidae

The honeyeaters are a large and diverse family of small to medium-sized birds most common in Australia and New Guinea. They are nectar feeders and closely resemble other nectar-feeding passerines.

- Plain honeyeater, Pycnopygius ixoides
- Marbled honeyeater, Pycnopygius cinereus
- Streak-headed honeyeater, Pycnopygius stictocephalus
- Puff-backed honeyeater, Meliphaga aruensis
- Yellow-spotted honeyeater, Meliphaga notata
- Scrub honeyeater, Microptilotis albonotatus
- Mountain honeyeater, Microptilotis orientalis
- Mimic honeyeater, Microptilotis analogus
- Forest honeyeater, Microptilotis montanus
- Mottled honeyeater, Microptilotis mimikae
- Yellow-gaped honeyeater, Microptilotis flavirictus
- Tagula honeyeater, Microptilotis vicina
- Graceful honeyeater, Microptilotis gracilis
- Elegant honeyeater, Microptilotis cinereifrons
- Black-throated honeyeater, Caligavis subfrenata
- Obscure honeyeater, Caligavis obscura
- Sooty melidectes, Melidectes fuscus
- Long-bearded melidectes, Melidectes princeps
- Ornate melidectes, Melidectes torquatus
- Cinnamon-browed melidectes, Melidectes ochromelas
- Huon melidectes, Melidectes foersteri (E)
- Belford's melidectes, Melidectes belfordi
- Yellow-browed melidectes, Melidectes rufocrissalis
- Varied honeyeater, Gavicalis versicolor
- Yellow-tinted honeyeater, Ptilotula flavescens
- Bougainville honeyeater, Stresemannia bougainvillei (E)
- Brown-backed honeyeater, Ramsayornis modestus
- Rufous-banded honeyeater, Conopophila albogularis
- Smoky honeyeater, Melipotes fumigatus
- Spangled honeyeater, Melipotes ater (E)
- Macgregor's honeyeater, Macgregoria pulchra
- Long-billed honeyeater, Melilestes megarhynchus
- Olive straightbill, Timeliopsis fulvigula
- Tawny straightbill, Timeliopsis griseigula
- Bismarck honeyeater, Vosea whitemanensis (E)
- White-chinned myzomela, Myzomela albigula (E)
- Ruby-throated myzomela, Myzomela eques
- Ashy myzomela, Myzomela cineracea (E)
- Dusky myzomela, Myzomela obscura
- Red myzomela, Myzomela cruentata
- Papuan black myzomela, Myzomela nigrita
- New Ireland myzomela, Myzomela pulchella (E)
- Red-headed myzomela, Myzomela erythrocephala
- Elfin myzomela, Myzomela adolphinae
- Sclater's myzomela, Myzomela sclateri (E)
- Bismarck black myzomela, Myzomela pammelaena (E)
- Scarlet-naped myzomela, Myzomela lafargei
- Black-bellied myzomela, Myzomela erythromelas (E)
- Red-collared myzomela, Myzomela rosenbergii
- Green-backed honeyeater, Glycichaera fallax
- Leaden honeyeater, Ptiloprora plumbea
- Yellow-streaked honeyeater, Ptiloprora meekiana
- Rufous-backed honeyeater, Ptiloprora guisei (E)
- Gray-streaked honeyeater, Ptiloprora perstriata
- Brown honeyeater, Lichmera indistincta
- Silver-eared honeyeater, Lichmera alboauricularis
- Blue-faced honeyeater, Entomyzon cyanotis
- White-throated honeyeater, Melithreptus albogularis
- Tawny-breasted honeyeater, Xanthotis flaviventer
- Spotted honeyeater, Xanthotis polygramma
- Little friarbird, Philemon citreogularis
- Meyer's friarbird, Philemon meyeri
- New Ireland friarbird, Philemon eichhorni (E)
- Helmeted friarbird, Philemon buceroides
- White-naped friarbird, Philemon albitorques (E)
- New Britain friarbird, Philemon cockerelli (E)
- Noisy friarbird, Philemon corniculatus

== Thornbills and allies ==
Order: Passeriformes Family: Acanthizidae

Thornbills are small passerine birds, similar in habits to the tits.

- Goldenface, Pachycare flavogriseum
- Rusty mouse-warbler, Crateroscelis murina
- Bicolored mouse-warbler, Crateroscelis nigrorufa
- Mountain mouse-warbler, Crateroscelis robusta
- Tropical scrubwren, Sericornis beccarii
- Large scrubwren, Sericornis nouhuysi
- Buff-faced scrubwren, Sericornis perspicillatus
- Papuan scrubwren, Sericornis papuensis
- Gray-green scrubwren, Sericornis arfakianus
- Pale-billed scrubwren, Sericornis spilodera
- Papuan thornbill, Acanthiza murina
- Gray thornbill, Acanthiza cinerea
- Green-backed gerygone, Gerygone chloronotus
- Fairy gerygone, Gerygone palpebrosa
- White-throated gerygone, Gerygone olivacea
- Yellow-bellied gerygone, Gerygone chrysogaster
- Large-billed gerygone, Gerygone magnirostris
- Golden-bellied gerygone, Gerygone sulphurea
- Brown-breasted gerygone, Gerygone ruficollis
- Mangrove gerygone, Gerygone levigaster

== Pseudo-babblers ==
Order: Passeriformes Family: Pomatostomidae

The pseudo-babblers are small to medium-sized birds endemic to Australia and New Guinea. They are ground-feeding omnivores and highly social.

- New Guinea babbler, Pomatostomus isidorei
- Gray-crowned babbler, Pomatostomus temporalis

== Logrunners ==
Order: Passeriformes Family: Orthonychidae

The Orthonychidae is a family of birds with a single genus, Orthonyx, which comprises two types of passerine birds endemic to Australia and New Guinea, the logrunners and the chowchilla. Both use stiffened tails to brace themselves when feeding.

- Papuan logrunner, Orthonyx novaeguineae

== Quail-thrushes and jewel-babblers ==
Order: Passeriformes Family: Cinclosomatidae

The Cinclosomatidae is a family containing jewel-babblers and quail-thrushes.

- Painted quail-thrush, Cinclosoma ajax
- Spotted jewel-babbler, Ptilorrhoa leucosticta
- Blue jewel-babbler, Ptilorrhoa caerulescens
- Dimorphic jewel-babbler, Ptilorrhoa geislerorum
- Chestnut-backed jewel-babbler, Ptilorrhoa castanonota

== Cuckooshrikes ==
Order: Passeriformes Family: Campephagidae

The cuckooshrikes are small to medium-sized passerine birds. They are predominantly greyish with white and black, although some species are brightly coloured.

- Stout-billed cuckooshrike, Coracina caeruleogrisea
- Hooded cuckooshrike, Coracina longicauda
- Barred cuckooshrike, Coracina lineata
- Boyer's cuckooshrike, Coracina boyeri
- Black-faced cuckooshrike, Coracina novaehollandiae
- North Melanesian cuckooshrike, Coracina welchmani
- White-bellied cuckooshrike, Coracina papuensis
- Manus cuckooshrike, Coracina ingens (E)
- South Melanesian cuckooshrike, Coracina caledonica
- Golden cuckooshrike, Campochaera sloetii
- White-winged triller, Lalage tricolor
- Black-browed triller, Lalage atrovirens
- Varied triller, Lalage leucomela
- Mussau triller, Lalage conjuncta (E)
- Black-bellied cicadabird, Edolisoma montanum
- Manus cicadabird, Edolisoma admiralitatis (E)
- Solomons cuckooshrike, Edolisoma holopolium
- Papuan cicadabird, Edolisoma incertum
- Common cicadabird, Edolisoma tenuirostre
- Gray-headed cicadabird, Edolisoma schisticeps
- Black cicadabird, Edolisoma melas

== Sittellas ==
Order: Passeriformes Family: Neosittidae

The sittellas are a family of small passerine birds found only in Australasia. They resemble treecreepers, but have soft tails.

- Black sittella, Daphoenositta miranda
- Papuan sittella, Daphoenositta papuensis

== Whipbirds and wedgebills ==
Order: Passeriformes Family: Psophodidae

The Psophodidae is a family containing whipbirds and wedgebills.

- Papuan whipbird, Androphobus viridis

== Ploughbill ==
Order: Passeriformes Family: Eulacestomidae

The wattled ploughbill was long thought to be related to the whistlers (Pachycephalidae), and shriketits (formerly Pachycephalidae, now often treated as its own family).

- Wattled ploughbill, Eulacestoma nigropectus

== Australo-Papuan bellbirds ==
Order: Passeriformes Family: Oreoicidae

The three species contained in the family have been moved around between different families for fifty years. A series of studies of the DNA of Australian birds between 2006 and 2001 found strong support for treating the three genera as a new family, which was formally named in 2016.

- Rufous-naped bellbird, Aleadryas rufinucha
- Piping bellbird, Ornorectes cristatus

== Tit berrypecker and crested berrypecker ==
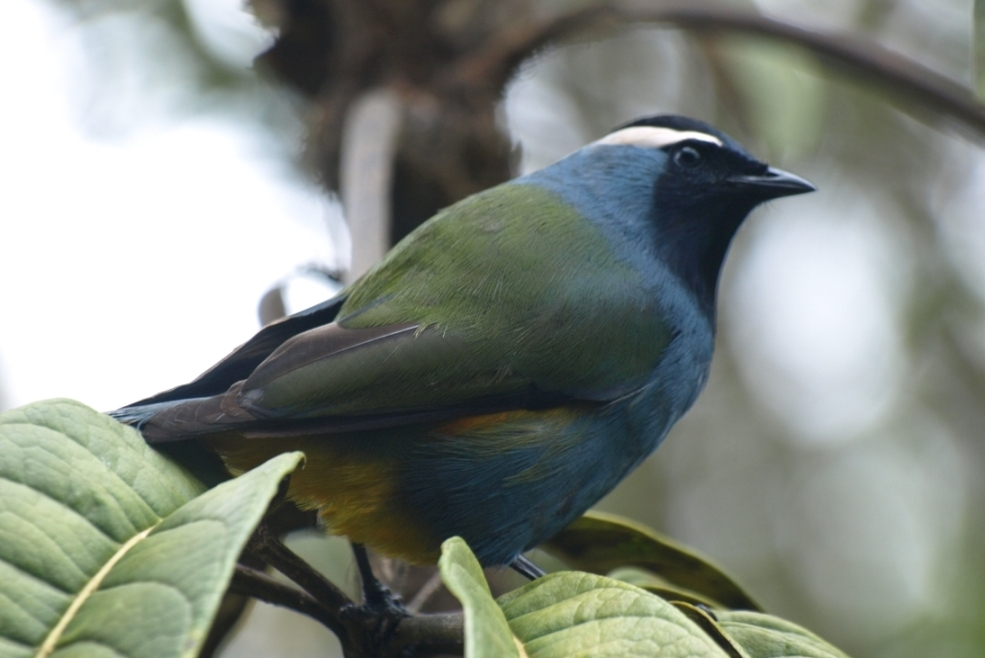
Crested berrypecker

Order: Passeriformes Family: Paramythiidae

Paramythiidae is a very small bird family restricted to the mountain forests of New Guinea. The two species are colourful medium-sized birds which feed on fruit and some insects.

- Tit berrypecker, Oreocharis arfaki
- Crested berrypecker, Paramythia montium

== Whistlers and allies ==
Order: Passeriformes Family: Pachycephalidae

The family Pachycephalidae includes the whistlers, shrikethrushes, and some of the pitohuis.

- Rusty pitohui, Pseudorectes ferrugineus
- White-bellied pitohui, Pseudorectes incertus
- Gray shrikethrush, Colluricincla harmonica
- Sooty shrikethrush, Colluricincla tenebrosa
- Variable shrikethrush, Colluricincla fortis (E)
- Sepik-Ramu shrikethrush, Colluricincla tappenbecki (E)
- Arafura shrikethrush, Colluricincla megarhyncha
- Tagula shrikethrush, Colluricincla discolor (E)
- Rufous shrikethrush, Colluricincla rufogaster
- Black pitohui, Melanorectes nigrescens
- Regent whistler, Pachycephala schlegelii
- Sclater's whistler, Pachycephala soror
- Bougainville hooded whistler, Pachycephala richardsi (E)
- Bismarck whistler, Pachycephala citreogaster (E)
- Louisiade whistler, Pachycephala collaris (E)
- Oriole whistler, Pachycephala orioloides
- Black-tailed whistler, Pachycephala melanura
- Brown-backed whistler, Pachycephala modesta (E)
- Lorentz's whistler, Pachycephala lorentzi
- Golden-backed whistler, Pachycephala aurea
- Rusty whistler, Pachycephala hyperythra
- Gray whistler, Pachycephala simplex
- White-bellied whistler, Pachycephala leucogastra
- Black-headed whistler, Pachycephala monacha
- Rufous whistler, Pachycephala rufiventris

== Old World orioles ==
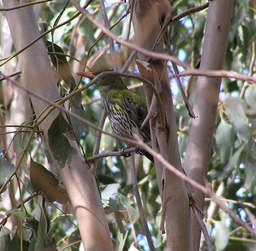
Olive-backed oriole

Order: Passeriformes Family: Oriolidae

The Old World orioles are colourful passerine birds. They are not related to the New World orioles.

- Hooded pitohui, Pitohui dichrous
- Northern variable pitohui, Pitohui kirhocephalus
- Southern variable pitohui, Pitohui uropygialis
- Brown oriole, Oriolus szalayi
- Olive-backed oriole, Oriolus sagittatus
- Green oriole, Oriolus flavocinctus
- Australasian figbird, Sphecotheres vieilloti

== Boatbills ==
Order: Passeriformes Family: Machaerirhynchidae

The boatbills have affinities to woodswallows and butcherbirds, and are distributed across New Guinea and northern Queensland.

- Black-breasted boatbill, Machaerirhynchus nigripectus
- Yellow-breasted boatbill, Machaerirhynchus flaviventer

== Woodswallows, bellmagpies, and allies ==
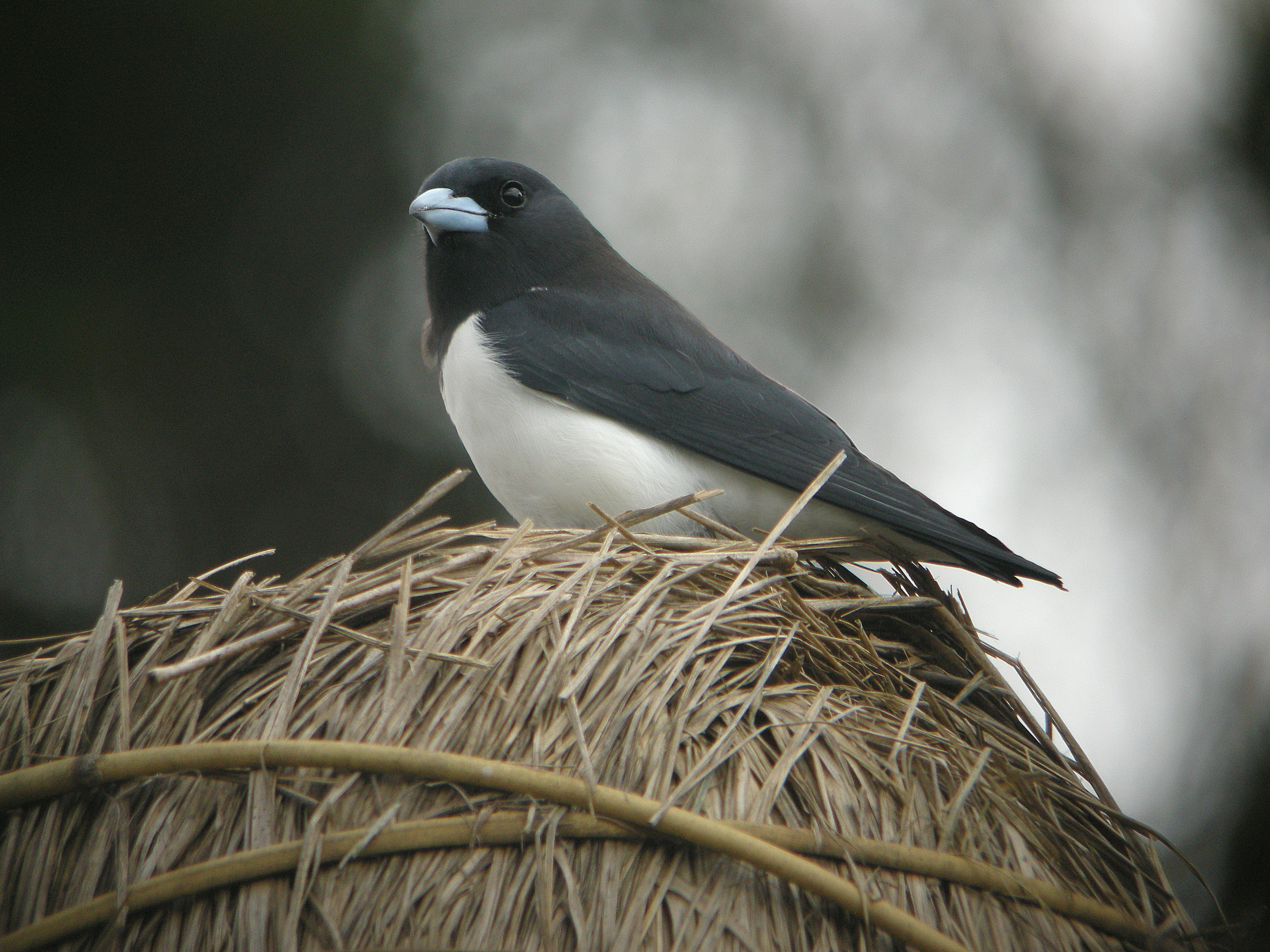
Great woodswallow

Order: Passeriformes Family: Artamidae

The woodswallows are soft-plumaged, somber-coloured passerine birds. They are smooth, agile flyers with moderately large, semi-triangular wings. The cracticids: currawongs, bellmagpies and butcherbirds, are similar to the other corvids. They have large, straight bills and mostly black, white or grey plumage. All are omnivorous to some degree.

- Great woodswallow, Artamus maximus
- White-breasted woodswallow, Artamus leucorynchus
- Bismarck woodswallow, Artamus insignis (E)
- Black-faced woodswallow, Artamus cinereus
- Mountain peltops, Peltops montanus
- Lowland peltops, Peltops blainvillii
- Black-backed butcherbird, Cracticus mentalis
- Hooded butcherbird, Cracticus cassicus
- Tagula butcherbird, Cracticus louisiadensis (E)
- Black butcherbird, Melloria quoyi
- Australian magpie, Gymnorhina tibicen

== Mottled berryhunter ==
Order: Passeriformes Family: Rhagologidae

The mottled berryhunter or mottled whistler (Rhagologus leucostigma) is a species of bird whose relationships are unclear but most likely related to the woodswallows, boatbills and butcherbirds.

- Mottled berryhunter, Rhagologus leucostigma

== Fantails ==
Order: Passeriformes Family: Rhipiduridae

The fantails are small insectivorous birds which are specialist aerial feeders.

- Drongo fantail, Chaetorhynchus papuensis
- Black fantail, Rhipidura atra
- Cockerell's fantail, Rhipidura cockerelli
- Northern fantail, Rhipidura rufiventris
- Sooty thicket-fantail, Rhipidura threnothorax
- Black thicket-fantail, Rhipidura maculipectus
- White-bellied thicket-fantail, Rhipidura leucothorax
- Willie-wagtail, Rhipidura leucophrys
- Rufous-backed fantail, Rhipidura rufidorsa
- Dimorphic fantail, Rhipidura brachyrhyncha
- Bismarck fantail, Rhipidura dahli (E)
- Mussau fantail, Rhipidura matthiae (E)
- Manus fantail, Rhipidura semirubra (E)
- Rufous fantail, Rhipidura rufifrons
- Arafura fantail, Rhipidura dryas
- Friendly fantail, Rhipidura albolimbata
- Chestnut-bellied fantail, Rhipidura hyperythra
- Brown fantail, Rhipidura drownei
- Gray fantail, Rhipidura albiscapa
- Mangrove fantail, Rhipidura phasiana

== Drongos ==
Order: Passeriformes Family: Dicruridae

The drongos are mostly black or dark grey in colour, sometimes with metallic tints. They have long forked tails, and some Asian species have elaborate tail decorations. They have short legs and sit very upright when perched, like a shrike. They flycatch or take prey from the ground.

- Hair-crested drongo, Dicrurus hottentottus
- Ribbon-tailed drongo, Dicrurus megarhynchus (E)
- Spangled drongo, Dicrurus bracteatus

== Birds-of-paradise ==
Order: Passeriformes Family: Paradisaeidae

The birds-of-paradise are best known for the striking plumage possessed by the males of most species, in particular highly elongated and elaborate feathers extending from the tail, wings or head. These plumes are used in courtship displays to attract females.

- Trumpet manucode, Phonygammus keraudrenii
- Curl-crested manucode, Manucodia comrii (E)
- Crinkle-collared manucode, Manucodia chalybata
- Jobi manucode, Manucodia jobiensis
- Glossy-mantled manucode, Manucodia atra
- King-of-Saxony bird-of-paradise, Pteridophora alberti
- Carola's parotia, Parotia carolae
- Wahnes's parotia, Parotia wahnesi (E)
- Lawes's parotia, Parotia lawesii (E)
- Twelve-wired bird-of-paradise, Seleucidis melanoleuca
- Black-billed sicklebill, Drepanornis albertisi
- Pale-billed sicklebill, Drepanornis bruijnii
- Greater lophorina, Lophorina superba
- Lesser lophorina, Lophorina minor (E)
- Magnificent riflebird, Ptiloris magnificus
- Growling riflebird, Ptiloris intercedens
- Black sicklebill, Epimachus fastuosus
- Brown sicklebill, Epimachus meyeri
- Short-tailed paradigalla, Paradigalla brevicauda
- Splendid astrapia, Astrapia splendidissima
- Huon astrapia, Astrapia rothschildi (E)
- Stephanie's astrapia, Astrapia stephaniae (E)
- Ribbon-tailed astrapia, Astrapia mayeri (E)
- King bird-of-paradise, Cicinnurus regius
- Magnificent bird-of-paradise, Cicinnurus magnificus
- Blue bird-of-paradise, Paradisaea rudolphi (E)
- Emperor bird-of-paradise, Paradisaea guilielmi (E)
- Goldie's bird-of-paradise, Paradisaea decora (E)
- Lesser bird-of-paradise, Paradisaea minor
- Raggiana bird-of-paradise, Paradisaea raggiana (E)
- Greater bird-of-paradise, Paradisaea apoda

== Ifritas ==
Order: Passeriformes Family: Ifritidae

The ifritas are a small and insectivorous passerine currently placed in the monotypic family, Ifritidae. Previously, the ifrit has been placed in a plethora of families including Cinclosomatidae or Monarchidae. They are considered an ancient relic species endemic to New Guinea.

- Blue-capped ifrita, Ifrita kowaldi

== Monarch flycatchers ==
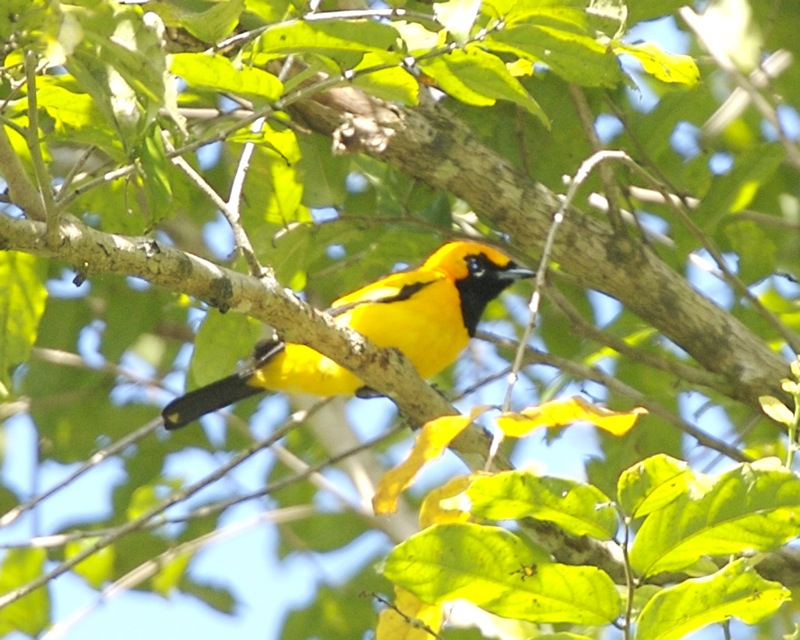
Golden monarch

Order: Passeriformes Family: Monarchidae

The monarch flycatchers are small to medium-sized insectivorous passerines which hunt by flycatching.

- Golden monarch, Carterornis chrysomela
- Island monarch, Monarcha cinerascens
- Chestnut-bellied monarch, Monarcha castaneiventris
- Bougainville monarch, Monarcha erythrostictus
- Black-faced monarch, Monarcha melanopsis
- Black-winged monarch, Monarcha frater
- Fan-tailed monarch, Symposiachrus axillaris
- Rufous monarch, Symposiachrus rubiensis
- Spectacled monarch, Symposiachrus trivirgatus
- Hooded monarch, Symposiachrus manadensis
- Manus monarch, Symposiachrus infelix (E)
- White-breasted monarch, Symposiachrus menckei (E)
- Black-tailed monarch, Symposiachrus verticalis (E)
- Spot-winged monarch, Symposiachrus guttula
- Frilled monarch, Arses telescopthalmus
- Ochre-collared monarch, Arses insularis
- Magpie-lark, Grallina cyanoleuca
- Torrent-lark, Grallina bruijni
- Leaden flycatcher, Myiagra rubecula
- Steel-blue flycatcher, Myiagra ferrocyanea
- Broad-billed flycatcher, Myiagra ruficollis
- Satin flycatcher, Myiagra cyanoleuca
- Restless flycatcher, Myiagra inquieta
- Paperbark flycatcher, Myiagra nana
- Shining flycatcher, Myiagra alecto
- Dull flycatcher, Myiagra hebetior (E)

== Melampittas ==
Order: Passeriformes Family: Melampittidae

They are little studied and before being established as a family in 2014 their taxonomic relationships with other birds were uncertain, being considered at one time related variously to the pittas, Old World babblers and birds-of-paradise.

- Lesser melampitta, Melampitta lugubris
- Greater melampitta, Melampitta gigantea

== Shrikes ==
Order: Passeriformes Family: Laniidae

Shrikes are passerine birds known for their habit of catching other birds and small animals and impaling the uneaten portions of their bodies on thorns. A typical shrike's beak is hooked, like a bird of prey.

- Brown shrike, Lanius cristatus
- Long-tailed shrike, Lanius schach

== Crows, jays, and magpies ==
Order: Passeriformes Family: Corvidae

The family Corvidae includes crows, ravens, jays, choughs, magpies, treepies, nutcrackers and ground jays. Corvids are above average in size among the Passeriformes, and some of the larger species show high levels of intelligence.

- Bougainville crow, Corvus meeki
- Gray crow, Corvus tristis
- Torresian crow, Corvus orru
- Bismarck crow, Corvus insularis (E)

== Satinbirds ==
Order: Passeriformes Family: Cnemophilidae

They are a family of passerine birds which consists of four species found in the mountain forests of New Guinea. They were originally thought to be part of the birds-of-paradise family Paradisaeidae until genetic research suggested that the birds are not closely related to birds-of-paradise at all and are perhaps closer to berry peckers and longbills (Melanocharitidae). The current evidence suggests that their closest relatives may be the cuckoo-shrikes (Campephagidae).

- Loria's satinbird, Cnemophilus loriae
- Crested satinbird, Cnemophilus macgregorii (E)
- Yellow-breasted satinbird, Loboparadisea sericea

== Berrypeckers and longbills ==
Order: Passeriformes Family: Melanocharitidae

The Melanocharitidae are medium-sized birds which feed on fruit and some insects and other invertebrates. They have drab plumage in greys, browns or black and white. The berrypeckers resemble stout short-billed honeyeaters, and the longbills are like drab sunbirds.

- Obscure berrypecker, Melanocharis arfakiana
- Black berrypecker, Melanocharis nigra
- Mid-mountain berrypecker, Melanocharis longicauda
- Fan-tailed berrypecker, Melanocharis versteri
- Streaked berrypecker, Melanocharis striativentris
- Spotted berrypecker, Melanocharis crassirostris
- Yellow-bellied longbill, Toxorhamphus novaeguineae
- Slaty-chinned longbill, Toxorhamphus poliopterus
- Spectacled longbill, Oedistoma iliolophus
- Pygmy longbill, Oedistoma pygmaeum

== Australasian robins ==
Order: Passeriformes Family: Petroicidae

Most species of Petroicidae have a stocky build with a large rounded head, a short straight bill and rounded wingtips. They occupy a wide range of wooded habitats, from subalpine to tropical rainforest, and mangrove swamp to semi-arid scrubland. All are primarily insectivores, although a few supplement their diet with seeds.

- Greater ground-robin, Amalocichla sclateriana
- Lesser ground-robin, Amalocichla incerta
- Torrent flycatcher, Monachella muelleriana
- Jacky-winter, Microeca fascinans
- Lemon-bellied flycatcher, Microeca flavigaster
- Yellow-legged flycatcher, Microeca griseoceps
- Olive flyrobin, Microeca flavovirescens
- Papuan flycatcher, Microeca papuana
- Garnet robin, Eugerygone rubra
- Subalpine robin, Petroica bivittata
- Pacific robin, Petroica pusilla
- White-faced robin, Tregellasia leucops
- Mangrove robin, Eopsaltria pulverulenta
- Black-chinned robin, Poecilodryas brachyura
- Black-sided robin, Poecilodryas hypoleuca
- Olive-yellow robin, Poecilodryas placens
- Black-throated robin, Poecilodryas albonotata
- White-winged robin, Peneothello sigillatus
- White-rumped robin, Peneothello bimaculatus
- Blue-gray robin, Peneothello cyanus
- Ashy robin, Heteromyias albispecularis
- Green-backed robin, Pachycephalopsis hattamensis
- White-eyed robin, Pachycephalopsis poliosoma
- Papuan scrub-robin, Drymodes beccarii

== Larks ==
Order: Passeriformes Family: Alaudidae

Larks are small terrestrial birds with often extravagant songs and display flights. Most larks are fairly dull in appearance. Their food is insects and seeds.

- Horsfield's bushlark, Mirafra javanica

== Cisticolas and allies ==
Order: Passeriformes Family: Cisticolidae

The Cisticolidae are warblers found mainly in warmer southern regions of the Old World. They are generally very small birds of drab brown or grey appearance found in open country such as grassland or scrub.

- Zitting cisticola, Cisticola juncidis
- Golden-headed cisticola, Cisticola exilis

== Reed warblers and allies ==
Order: Passeriformes Family: Acrocephalidae

The members of this family are usually rather large for "warblers". Most are rather plain olivaceous brown above with much yellow to beige below. They are usually found in open woodland, reedbeds, or tall grass. The family occurs mostly in southern to western Eurasia and surroundings, but it also ranges far into the Pacific, with some species in Africa.

- Oriental reed warbler, Acrocephalus orientalis
- Clamorous reed warbler, Acrocephalus stentoreus
- Australian reed warbler, Acrocephalus australis

== Grassbirds and allies ==
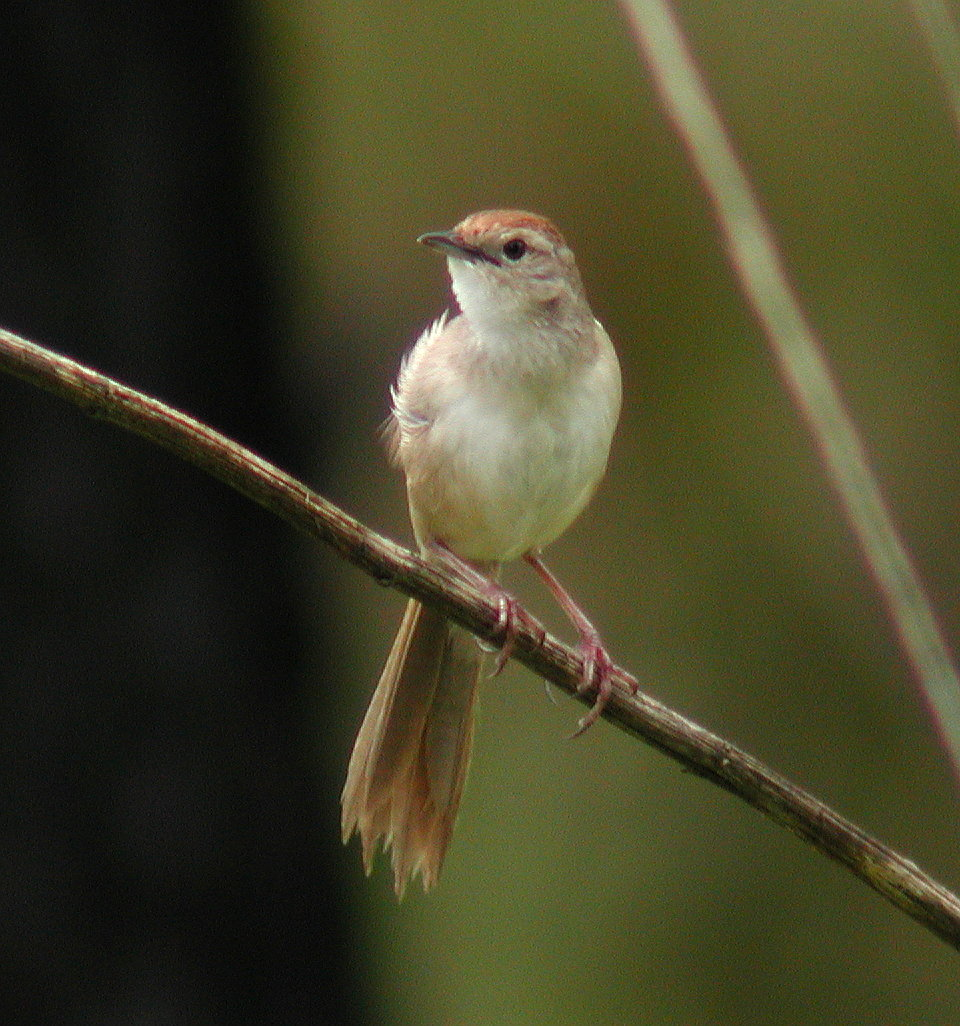
Tawny grassbird

Order: Passeriformes Family: Locustellidae

Locustellidae are a family of small insectivorous songbirds found mainly in Eurasia, Africa, and the Australian region. They are smallish birds with tails that are usually long and pointed, and tend to be drab brownish or buffy all over.

- Fly River grassbird, Poodytes albolimbatus
- Little grassbird, Poodytes gramineus
- Bismarck thicketbird, Cincloramphus grosvenori (E)
- Rusty thicketbird, Cincloramphus rubiginosus (E)
- Bougainville thicketbird, Cincloramphus llaneae (E)
- Tawny grassbird, Cincloramphus timoriensis
- Papuan grassbird, Cincloramphus macrurus
- Gray's grasshopper warbler, Helopsaltes fasciolatus

== Swallows ==
Order: Passeriformes Family: Hirundinidae

The family Hirundinidae is adapted to aerial feeding. They have a slender streamlined body, long pointed wings and a short bill with a wide gape. The feet are adapted to perching rather than walking, and the front toes are partially joined at the base.

- Bank swallow, Riparia riparia
- Barn swallow, Hirundo rustica
- Welcome swallow, Hirundo neoxena
- Pacific swallow, Hirundo tahitica
- Red-rumped swallow, Cecropis daurica
- Striated swallow, Cecropis striolata
- Fairy martin, Petrochelidon ariel
- Tree martin, Petrochelidon nigricans

== Bulbuls ==
Order: Passeriformes Family: Pycnonotidae

Bulbuls are medium-sized songbirds. Some are colourful with yellow, red or orange vents, cheeks, throats or supercilia, but most are drab, with uniform olive-brown to black plumage. Some species have distinct crests.

- Sooty-headed bulbul, Pycnonotus aurigaster (A)

== Leaf warblers ==
Order: Passeriformes Family: Phylloscopidae

Leaf warblers are a family of small insectivorous birds found mostly in Eurasia and ranging into Wallacea and Africa. The species are of various sizes, often green-plumaged above and yellow below, or more subdued with greyish-green to greyish-brown colours.

- Japanese leaf warbler, Phylloscopus xanthodryas (A) vagrant
- Arctic warbler, Phylloscopus borealis (A) vagrant
- Kamchatka leaf warbler, Phylloscopus examinandus (A) vagrant
- Mountain warbler, Phylloscopus trivirgatus
- Island leaf warbler, Phylloscopus poliocephalus

== Bush warblers and allies ==
Order: Passeriformes Family: Scotocercidae

The members of this family are found throughout Africa, Asia, and Polynesia. Their taxonomy is in flux, and some authorities place some genera in other families.

- Odedi, Horornis haddeni (E)

== White-eyes, yuhinas, and allies ==
Order: Passeriformes Family: Zosteropidae

The white-eyes are small and mostly undistinguished, their plumage above being generally some dull colour like greenish-olive, but some species have a white or bright yellow throat, breast or lower parts, and several have buff flanks. As their name suggests, many species have a white ring around each eye.

- Lemon-bellied white-eye, Zosterops chloris
- Ashy-bellied white-eye, Zosterops citrinella
- Black-crowned white-eye, Zosterops atrifrons
- Black-fronted white-eye, Zosterops minor
- Tagula white-eye, Zosterops meeki (E)
- Black-headed white-eye, Zosterops hypoxanthus (E)
- Capped white-eye, Zosterops fuscicapilla
- New Guinea white-eye, Zosterops novaeguineae
- Louisiade white-eye, Zosterops griseotinctus (E)
- Yellow-throated white-eye, Zosterops metcalfii

== Starlings ==
Order: Passeriformes Family: Sturnidae

Starlings are small to medium-sized passerine birds. Their flight is strong and direct and they are very gregarious. Their preferred habitat is fairly open country. They eat insects and fruit. Plumage is typically dark with a metallic sheen.

- Metallic starling, Aplonis metallica
- Yellow-eyed starling, Aplonis mystacea
- Atoll starling, Aplonis feadensis
- White-eyed starling, Aplonis brunneicapillus
- Brown-winged starling, Aplonis grandis
- Singing starling, Aplonis cantoroides
- Moluccan starling, Aplonis mysolensis
- Yellow-faced myna, Mino dumontii
- Golden myna, Mino anais
- Long-tailed myna, Mino kreffti
- Common hill myna, Gracula religiosa
- European starling, Sturnus vulgaris (I)
- Common myna, Acridotheres tristis (I)

== Thrushes and allies ==
Order: Passeriformes Family: Turdidae

The thrushes are a group of passerine birds that occur mainly in the Old World. They are plump, soft plumaged, small to medium-sized insectivores or sometimes omnivores, often feeding on the ground. Many have attractive songs.

- Scaly thrush, Zoothera dauma
- New Britain thrush, Zoothera talaseae (E)
- Bougainville thrush, Zoothera atrigena (E)
- Russet-tailed thrush, Zoothera heinei
- Island thrush, Turdus poliocephalus

== Old World flycatchers ==
Order: Passeriformes Family: Muscicapidae

Old World flycatchers are a large group of small passerine birds native to the Old World. They are mainly small arboreal insectivores. The appearance of these birds is highly varied, but they mostly have weak songs and harsh calls.

- Gray-streaked flycatcher, Muscicapa griseisticta
- Siberian rubythroat, Calliope calliope
- Blue rock-thrush, Monticola solitarius
- Pied bushchat, Saxicola caprata

== Flowerpeckers ==
Order: Passeriformes Family: Dicaeidae

The flowerpeckers are very small, stout, often brightly coloured birds, with short tails, short thick curved bills and tubular tongues.

- Olive-crowned flowerpecker, Dicaeum pectorale
- Red-capped flowerpecker, Dicaeum geelvinkianum
- Louisiade flowerpecker, Dicaeum nitidum (E)
- Red-banded flowerpecker, Dicaeum eximium (E)
- Midget flowerpecker, Dicaeum aeneum
- Mistletoebird, Dicaeum hirundinaceum

== Sunbirds and spiderhunters ==
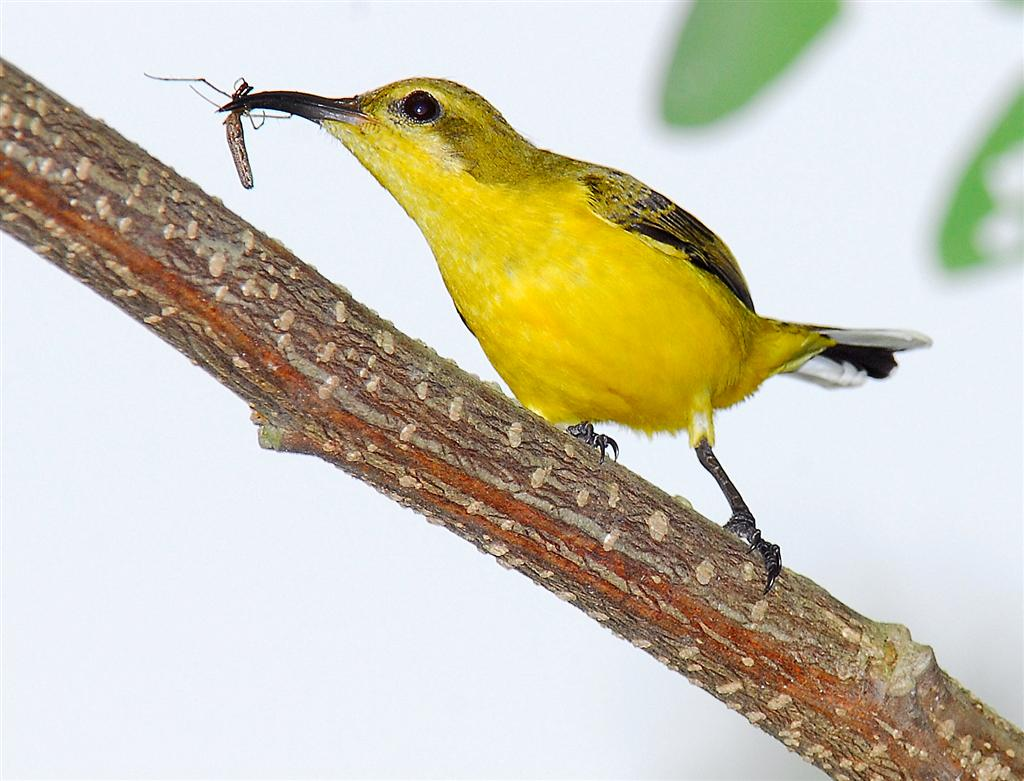
Olive-backed sunbird

Order: Passeriformes Family: Nectariniidae

The sunbirds and spiderhunters are very small passerine birds which feed largely on nectar, although they will also take insects, especially when feeding young. Flight is fast and direct on their short wings. Most species can take nectar by hovering like a hummingbird, but usually perch to feed.

- Black sunbird, Leptocoma sericea
- Olive-backed sunbird, Cinnyris jugularis

== Waxbills and allies ==
Order: Passeriformes Family: Estrildidae

The estrildid finches are small passerine birds of the Old World tropics and Australasia. They are gregarious and often colonial seed eaters with short thick but pointed bills. They are all similar in structure and habits, but have wide variation in plumage colours and patterns.

- Mountain firetail, Oreostruthus fuliginosus
- Red-browed firetail, Neochmia temporalis
- Crimson finch, Neochmia phaeton
- Blue-faced parrotfinch, Erythrura trichroa
- Papuan parrotfinch, Erythrura papuana
- Streak-headed munia, Mayrimunia tristissima
- White-spotted munia, Mayrimunia leucosticta
- Grand munia, Lonchura grandis
- Gray-crowned munia, Lonchura nevermanni
- Hooded munia, Lonchura spectabilis
- Gray-headed munia, Lonchura caniceps (E)
- Mottled munia, Lonchura hunsteini (E)
- New Ireland munia, Lonchura forbesi (E)
- New Hanover munia, Lonchura nigerrima (E)
- Chestnut-breasted munia, Lonchura castaneothorax
- Black munia, Lonchura stygia
- Snow Mountain munia, Lonchura montana
- Alpine munia, Lonchura monticola (E)
- Bismarck munia, Lonchura melaena (E)

== Old World sparrows ==
Order: Passeriformes Family: Passeridae

Old World sparrows are small passerine birds. In general, sparrows tend to be small, plump, brown or grey birds with short tails and short powerful beaks. Sparrows are seed eaters, but they also consume small insects.

- House sparrow, Passer domesticus (I)
- Eurasian tree sparrow, Passer montanus (A)

== Wagtails and pipits ==
Order: Passeriformes Family: Motacillidae

Motacillidae is a family of small passerine birds with medium to long tails. They include the wagtails, longclaws and pipits. They are slender, ground feeding insectivores of open country.

- Gray wagtail, Motacilla cinerea
- Western yellow wagtail, Motacilla flava
- Eastern yellow wagtail, Motacilla tschutschensis
- Australian pipit, Anthus australis
- Paddyfield pipit, Anthus rufulus (A)
- Alpine pipit, Anthus gutturalis

== See also ==
- List of birds
- Lists of birds by region
