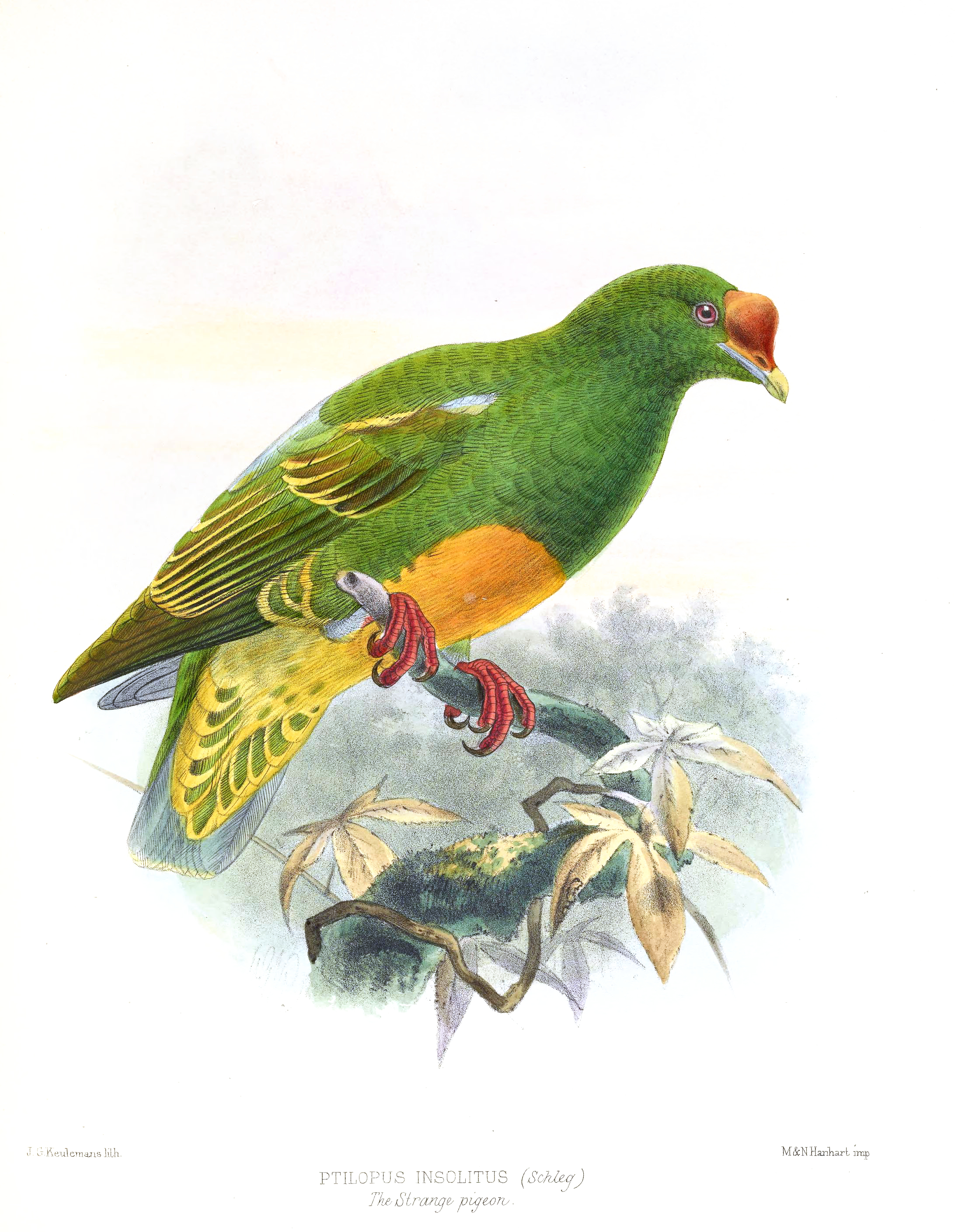

Conservation status
- Least Concern (IUCN 3.1)

Scientific classification
- Kingdom: Animalia
- Phylum: Chordata
- Class: Aves
- Order: Columbiformes
- Family: Columbidae
- Genus: Ptilinopus
- Species: P. insolitus

Binomial name
- Ptilinopus insolitus Schlegel, 1863

Synonyms
- Ptilopus insolitus Schlegel, 1863

= Knob-billed fruit dove =

Species of bird

The knob-billed fruit dove (Ptilinopus insolitus) is a species of bird in the family Columbidae. It is endemic to the Bismarck Archipelago.

== Taxonomy and systematics ==
The knob-billed fruit dove was originally described as Ptilopus insolitus by Hermann Schlegel in 1863 on the basis of specimens from New Ireland. The name of the genus was later emended to Ptilinopus. The generic name Ptilinopus is derived from the Ancient Greek words πτιλον (ptilon), meaning feather, and πους (pous), meaning foot. The specific name insolitus is from the Latin word insolitus, meaning strange. Knob-billed fruit dove is the official common name designated by the International Ornithologists' Union. Other common names for the species include red-knobbed fruit dove and Schlegel's fruit-dove.

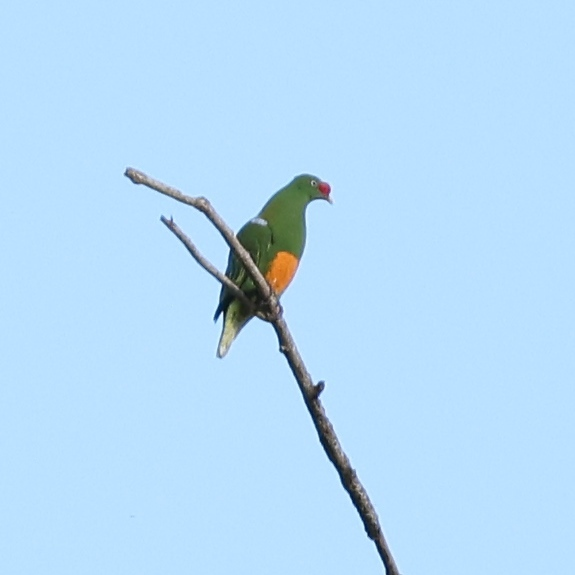
On tree branch

The knob-billed fruit dove is closely related to the orange-bellied fruit dove, and these two species are thought to form a species group with the grey-headed and carunculated fruit doves. This group may also include the black-naped and dwarf fruit doves.

There are two recognised subspecies of the knob-billed fruit dove. Variation between subspecies may be clinal.

- Ptilinopus insolitus insolitus – Schlegel, 1863: The nominate subspecies. Found in the Bismarck Archipelago, except where inferior occurs.
- Ptilinopus insolitus inferior – Hartert, 1924: Found on Mussau and Emirau. It is much smaller than the nominate subspecies and has russet feathering around the grey shoulder patch, and may represent a separate species.
