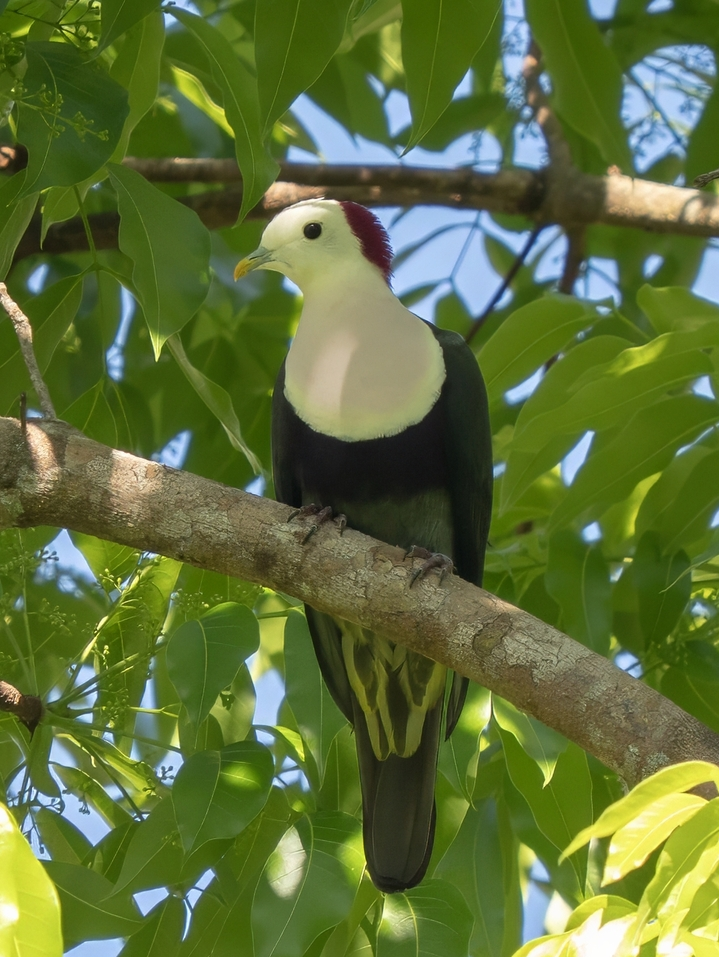

Conservation status
- Vulnerable (IUCN 3.1)

Scientific classification
- Kingdom: Animalia
- Phylum: Chordata
- Class: Aves
- Order: Columbiformes
- Family: Columbidae
- Genus: Ptilinopus
- Species: P. dohertyi

Binomial name
- Ptilinopus dohertyi Rothschild, 1896

= Red-naped fruit dove =

Species of bird

The red-naped fruit dove (Ptilinopus dohertyi) is a species of bird in the family Columbidae. It is endemic to Sumba.

Its natural habitat is subtropical or tropical moist montane forests. It is threatened by habitat loss.

== Taxonomy ==
The red-naped fruit dove was previously placed in the genus Leucotreron. It seems to be closely related to the banded, pink-headed, and black-banded fruit doves.

== Description ==
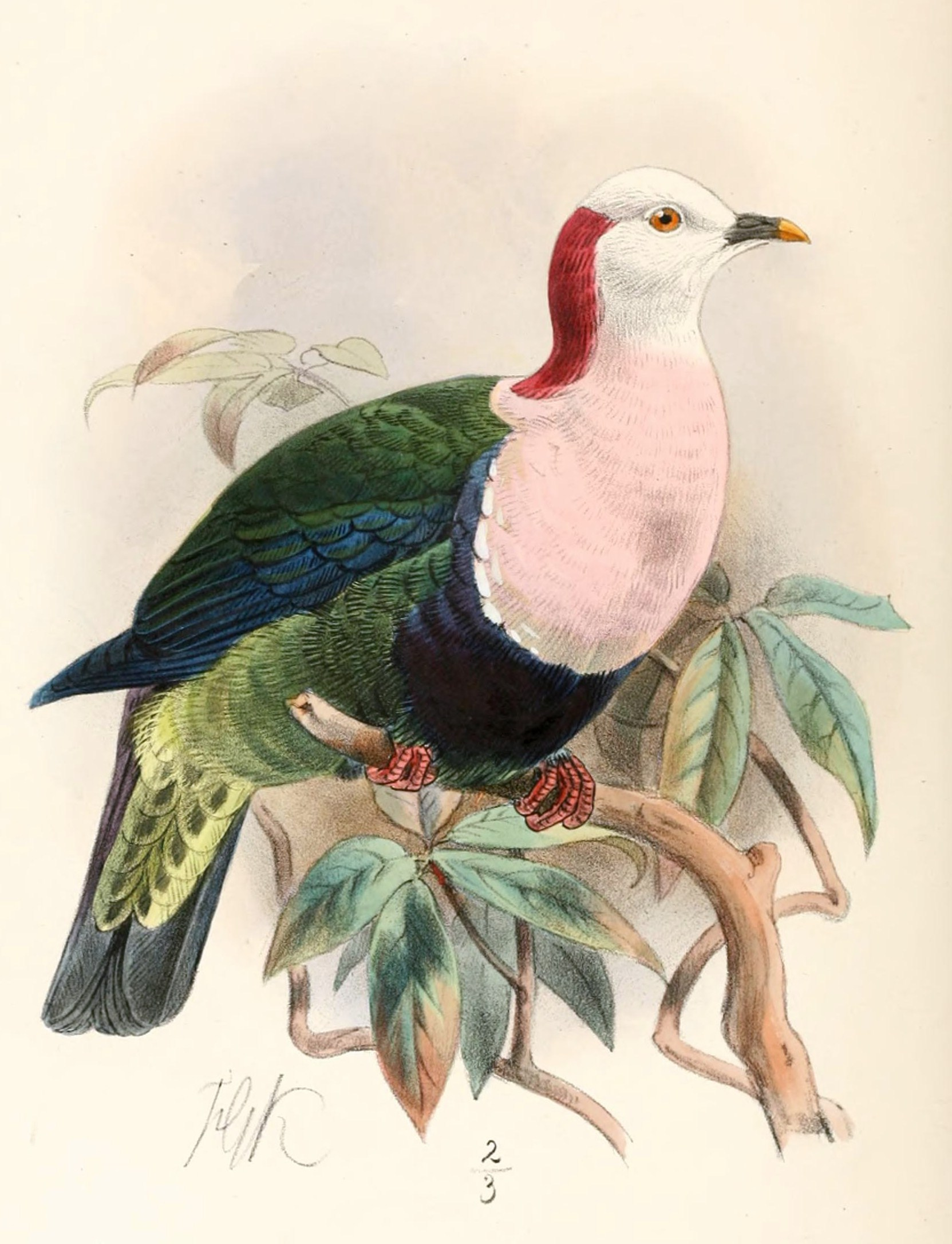
An illustration by John Gerrard Keulemans

The red-naped fruit dove is a large fruit pigeon, reaching an average length of 35 cm. The head and upper neck are creamy white, separated from the pale pink lower neck and breast by a narrow yellowish-white band. The eponymous red patch on the back of the neck is made of long, hairy feathers. The rest of the upperparts are dark metallic to purplish blue, with dark greenish edges to the feathers. The belly and flanks are greyish-green, separated from the breast by a dark purple breast-band. The upper back and inner wing-coverts are dark bronze green. The underside of both the tail and wings is greyish-black. The undertail-coverts are coloured with green and yellow streaks, while the central rectrices are dark purple. The legs are purplish-grey and the beak is yellow-tipped grey. Only one juvenile is known, but they appear to be much greener than adults.

== Distribution and habitat ==
The species is endemic to the island of Sumba in Indonesia, where it mostly inhabits montane forests at elevations above 500 m. It is sometimes seen as low as 160 m.

== Status ==
Although Sumba has suffered high levels of deforestation for cultivation and grazing, the montane forests preferred by the red-naped fruit dove have not as severely affected as the montane forests this species prefers. A 1992 survey estimated that the dove's population numbered around 9000 individuals.
