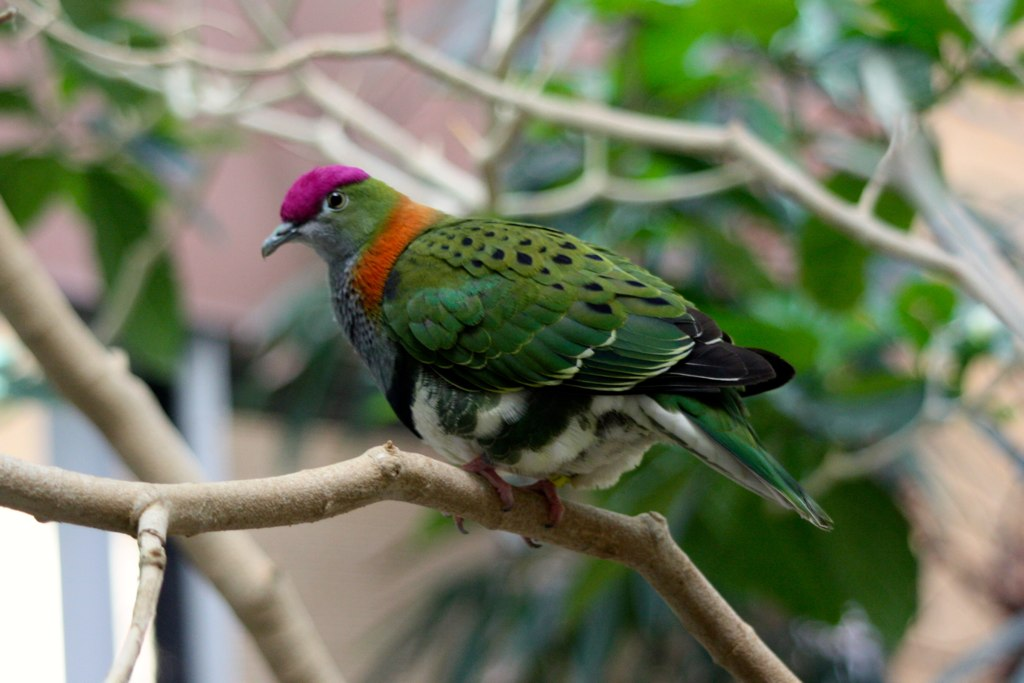
- Male at London Zoo

Conservation status
- Least Concern (IUCN 3.1)

Scientific classification
- Kingdom: Animalia
- Phylum: Chordata
- Class: Aves
- Order: Columbiformes
- Family: Columbidae
- Genus: Ptilinopus
- Species: P. superbus

Binomial name
- Ptilinopus superbus (Temminck, 1809)

= Superb fruit dove =

Species of bird

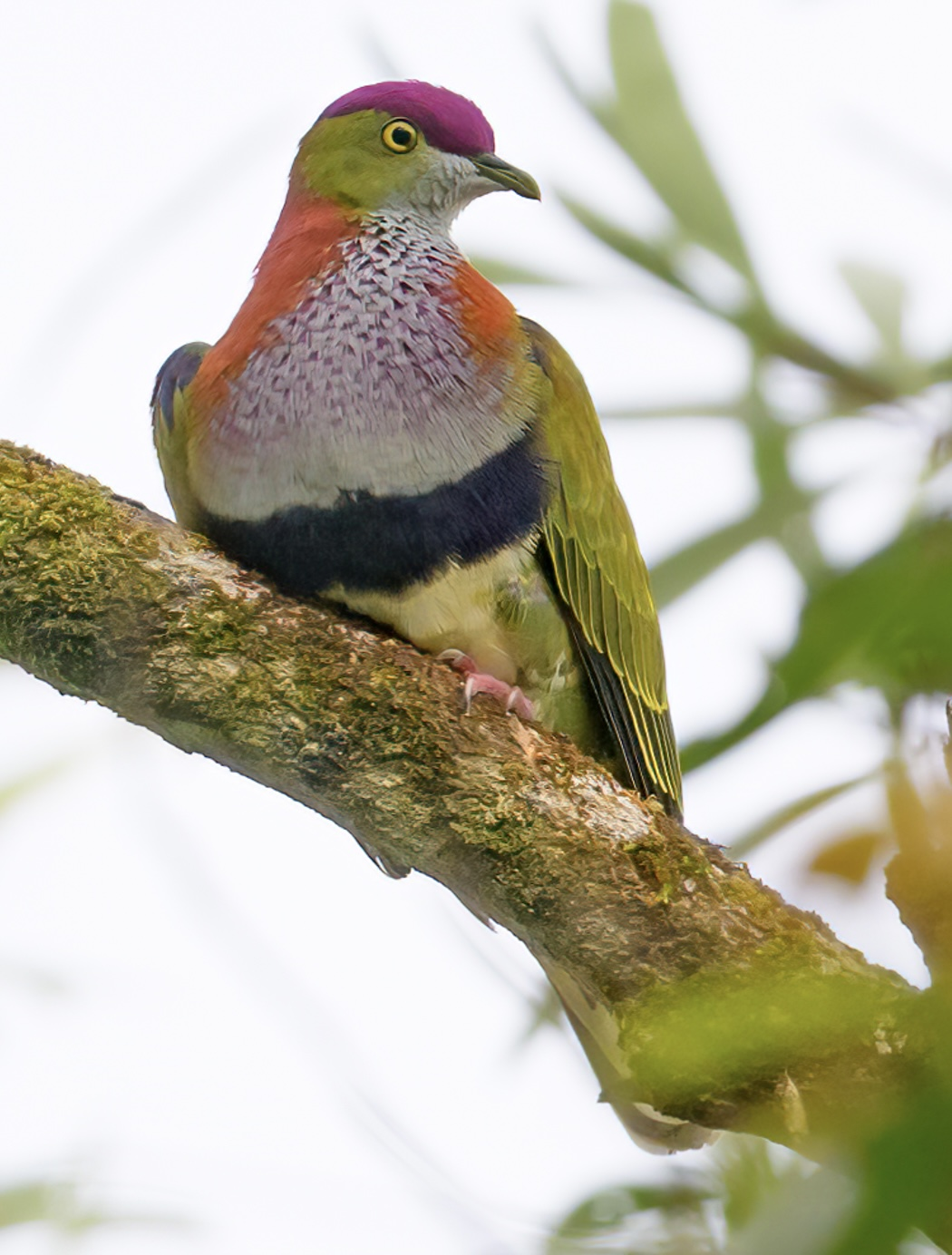
Male at Iron Range NP, Queensland.

The superb fruit dove (Ptilinopus superbus), also known as the purple-crowned fruit dove (leading to easy confusion with the purple-capped fruit dove), is a medium-sized (22–24 cm long), colourful fruit-dove in the family Columbidae.

== Description ==
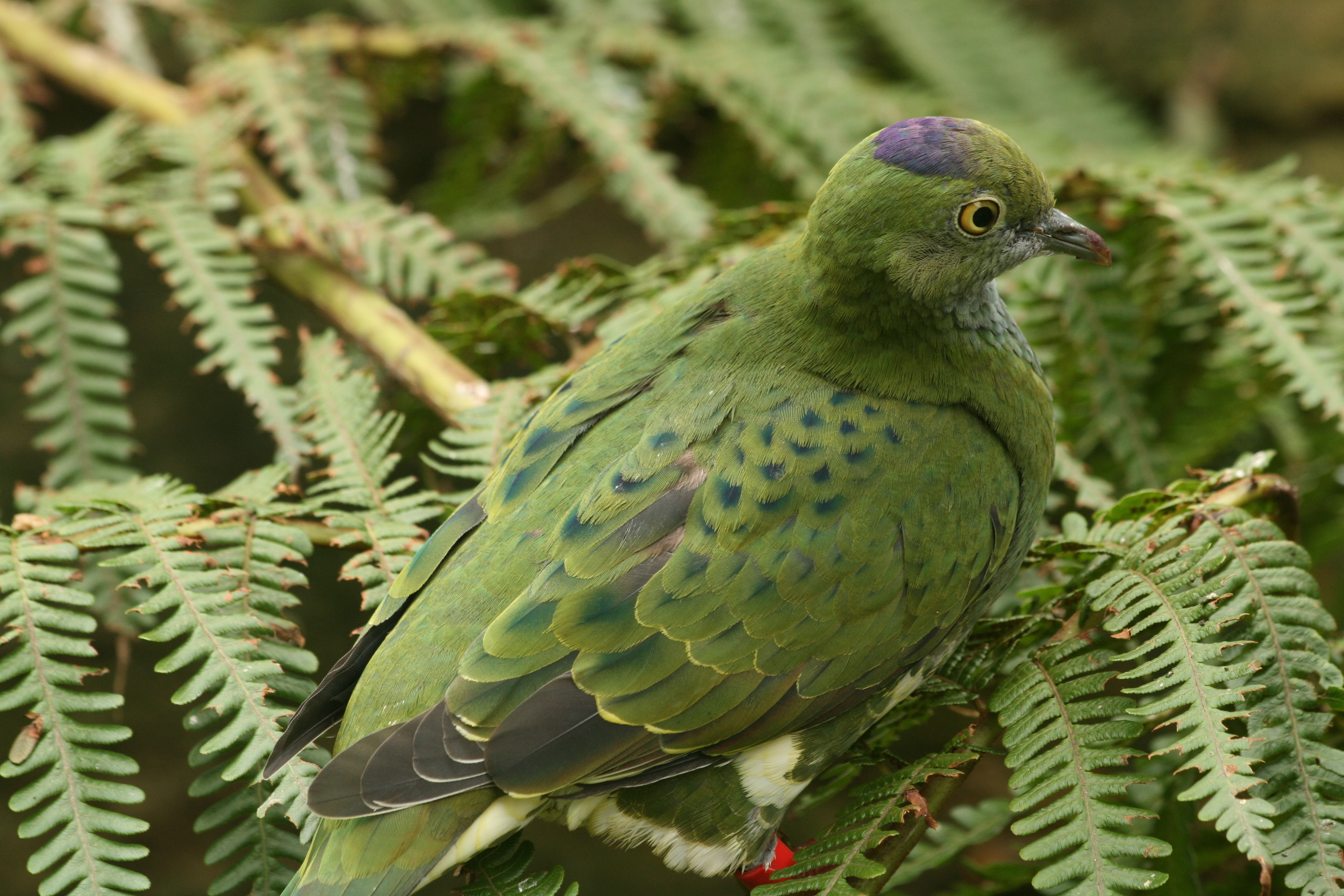
Female at Taronga Zoo, Australia

It is sexually dimorphic. Males are superbly coloured with a fiery orange nape, green ears, and a purple crown. The breast is grey, and divided from the abdomen by a wide, dark blue band. Their wings are olive green covered with dark spots, and the tail is tipped with white. Females are mostly green, with a white abdomen, blue wing tips, light blue breast, and a small, dark blue spot on the back of the head. Both sexes have yellow eyes and eye-rings. Despite its colourful plumage, the superb fruit dove is well-camouflaged amongst the rainforest foliage.

== Range ==
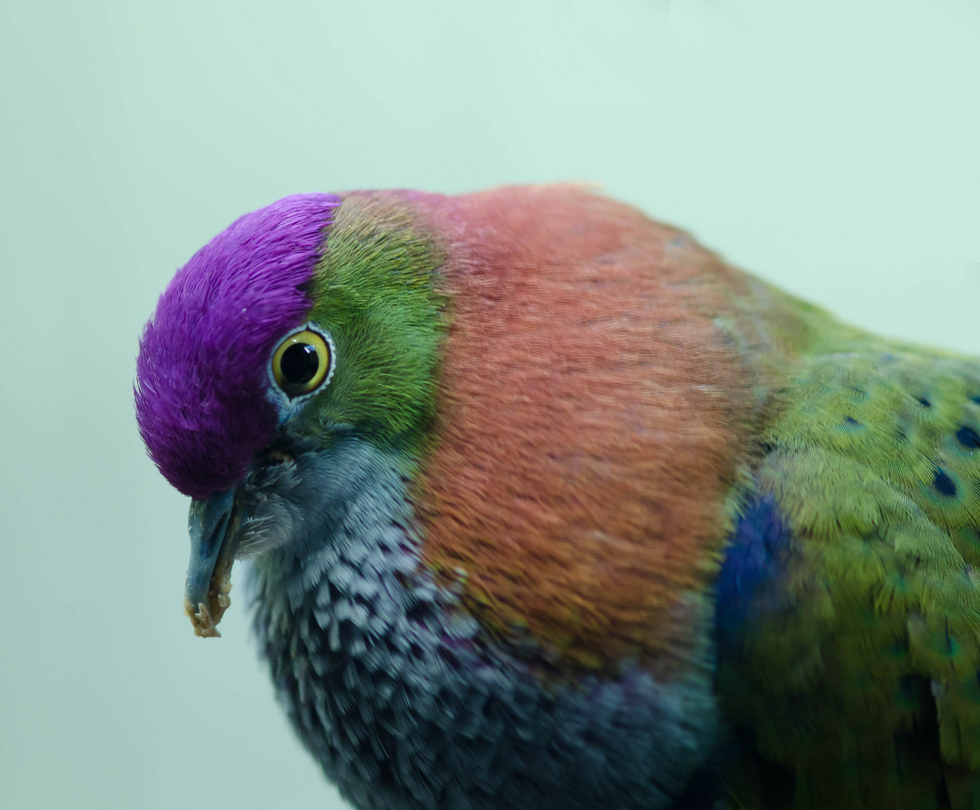
Male at Burgers' Zoo, Netherlands

Native to Australasia, the superb fruit dove lives in the rainforests of New Guinea, Australia, Solomon Islands, the Philippines and Sulawesi of Indonesia. In Australia, it is found from southern New South Wales around the town of Moruya and extends further north, where it becomes more common to Cape York in Queensland. In some areas of its range, such as the New Guinean rainforest, it is a resident bird; in more marginal or seasonal habitats such as those in Australia, flocks are known to move about according to the availability of food.

== Diet ==
The superb fruit dove feeds primarily upon fruits and berries. In the Port Moresby area, the bulk of its diet was found to consist of figs, notably Ficus albipila and Ficus benjamina, Canarium australianum drupes, and Archontophoenix, Calamus and Livistona palm fruit. Also frequently eaten were the fruits of various cinnamon trees, Litsea, Neolitsea and Cryptocarya. Less important food were fruits of Ylang-ylang (Cananga odorata), Syzygium, and Vitex cofassus. They eat smaller fruit than some other fruit doves; the maximum recorded volume was 2.5 cm³; in a spherical fruit, a 1.7 cm diameter.

== Behaviour ==
Superb fruit doves' wings whistle when they fly, and their call is a steady coo-coo-coo-coo.

The breeding season lasts from September to January. A small platform of twigs is built 5–30 metres off the ground, in which the female lays one small, white egg. She incubates it during the night. The male takes his turn during the day.

== Conservation ==
Habitat loss is a primary threat, but the superb fruit dove is still fairly widespread and common throughout its large range. The IUCN Red List of Threatened Species ranks it as least concern. In New South Wales, however, the superb fruit dove is considered vulnerable, meaning it is likely to become endangered.
