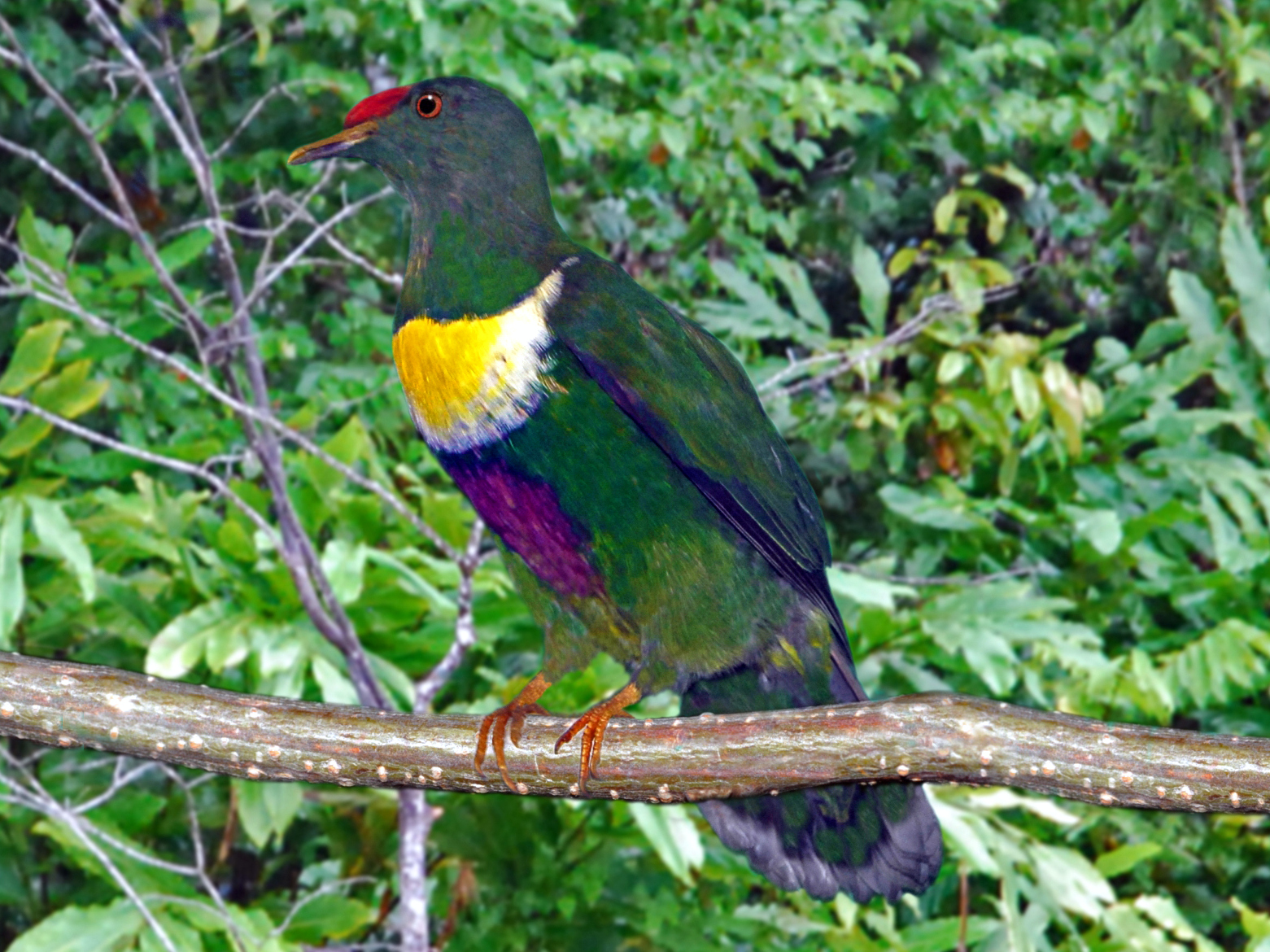
- Ptilinopus rivoli bellus. Male

Conservation status
- Least Concern (IUCN 3.1)

Scientific classification
- Kingdom: Animalia
- Phylum: Chordata
- Class: Aves
- Order: Columbiformes
- Family: Columbidae
- Genus: Ptilinopus
- Species: P. rivoli

Binomial name
- Ptilinopus rivoli (Prévost, 1843)

= White-bibbed fruit dove =

Species of bird

The white-bibbed fruit dove (Ptilinopus rivoli) is a species of bird in the family Columbidae.

== Subspecies ==
Subspecies include:

- Ptilinopus rivoli bellus P.L.Sclater, 1874 - New Guinea, Karkar Island, Goodenough Island
- Ptilinopus rivoli miquelii Schlegel, 1871 - Yapen and Meos Num (northern New Guinea
- Ptilinopus rivoli prasinorrhous G.R.Gray, 1858 - Aru Islands, West Papuan Islands and Geelvink Bay Islands
- Ptilinopus rivoli rivoli (Prévost, 1843) - Umboi Island
- Ptilinopus rivoli strophium Gould, 1850 - Egum Atoll (Trobriand Islands) and Louisiade Archipelago
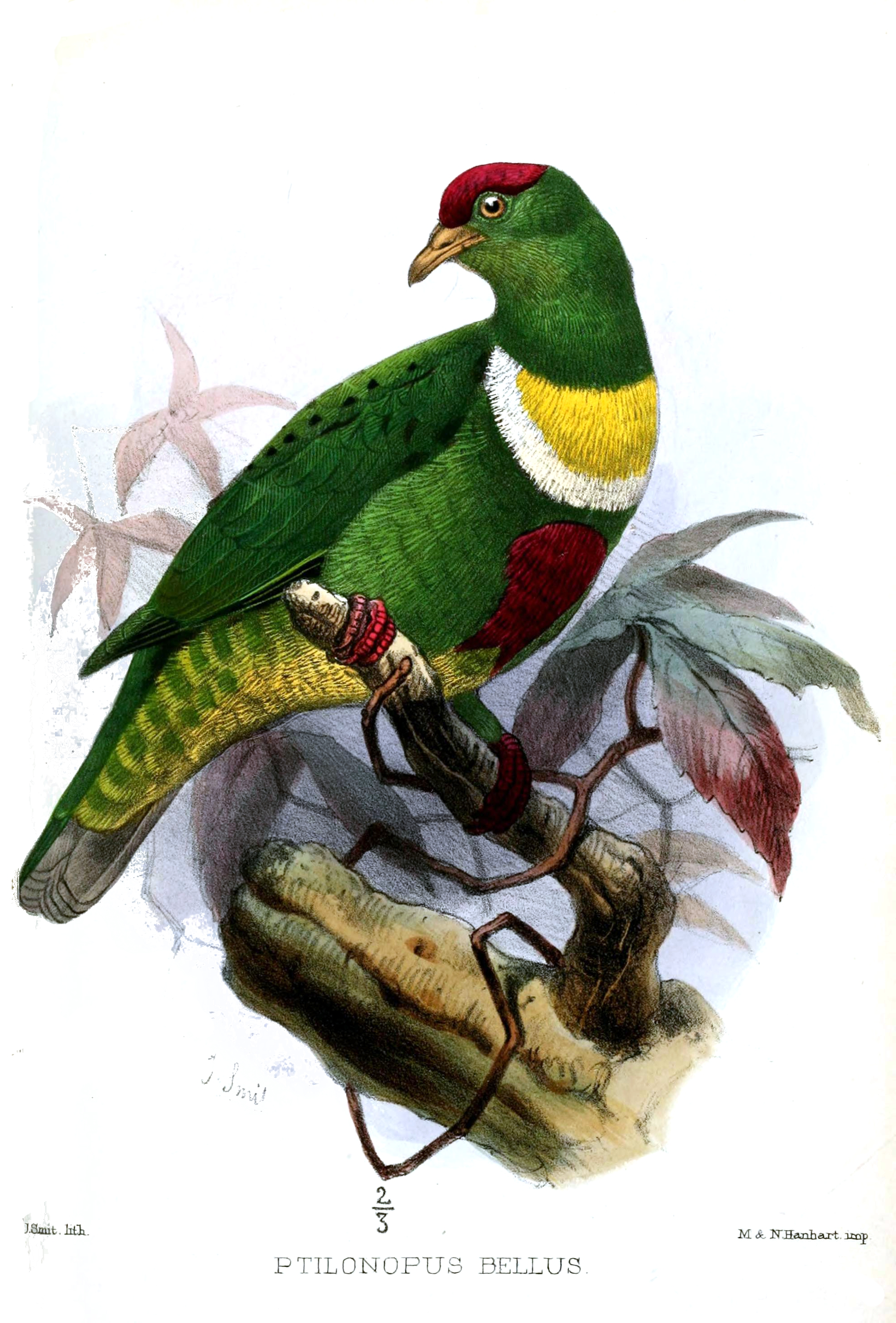
Ptilinopus rivoli bellus

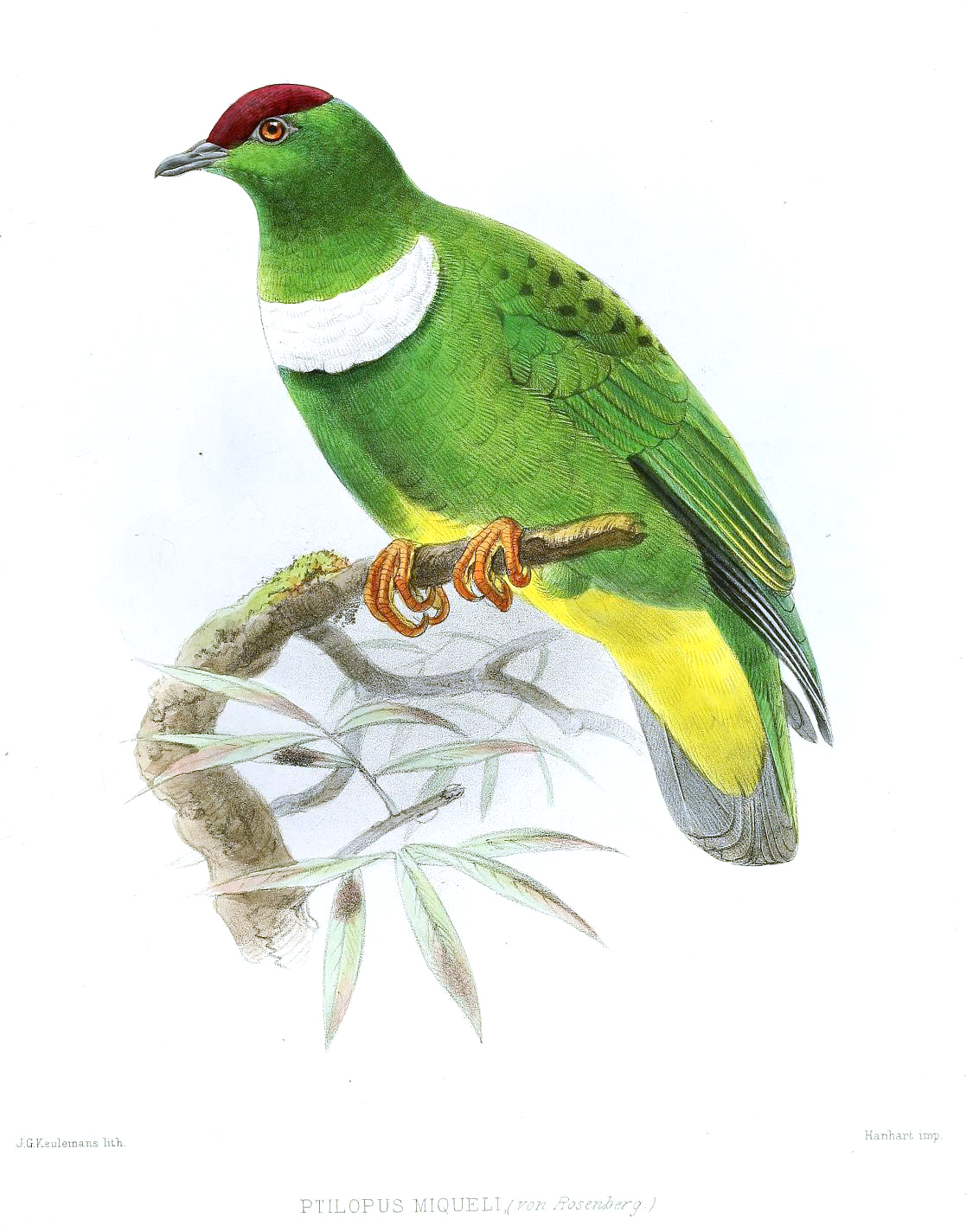
Ptilinopus rivoli miqueli

== Distribution ==
This species can be found in the Maluku Islands, New Guinea and the Bismarck Archipelago. It is also present in many of the islands bordering New Guinea, as well as in the Moluccas and the Aru Islands Regency among others.

The islands on which the white-bibbed fruit dove is relatively common include Buru, Seram and Karkar.

== Habitat ==
Its natural habitats are subtropical or tropical moist lowland forest and subtropical or tropical moist montane forest. It occurs predominantly on primary mountain forest, but it also inhabits secondary forest in a lower density.

In New Guinea it is typically found at altitudes between 1,000 and 3,260 meters above sea level. On smaller islands such as Aru Islands Regency, however, it can also be found in the lowlands. It is a species that predominantly prefers the tree canopy.

== Description ==
Ptilinopus rivoli can reach a body length of 23.5 to 26 centimeters. It is smaller than an African collared dove, but more compact with shorter and rounded tail. In this species the sexes are dimorphic. The males have a striking purple head cap while the females are almost entirely green feathered. The plumage is predominantly dark green. There is a large crescent-shaped white band on the chest. Depending on the subspecies, this band can also have a yellowish tinge. The color of the belly and the underside of the tail also vary depending on the subspecies. There is an elongated, narrow spot of purple color on the belly. The tail feathers are bright yellow. In some subspecies, however, the belly is also pure yellow and the tail feathers are green. The beak is bright yellow.

== Biology ==
Ptilinopus rivoli is a fruit-eating species that picks fruits from the branches, but seldom on the ground. The nest is put together from twigs. The laying comprises two eggs, which is atypical for fruit pigeons native to New Guinea.
