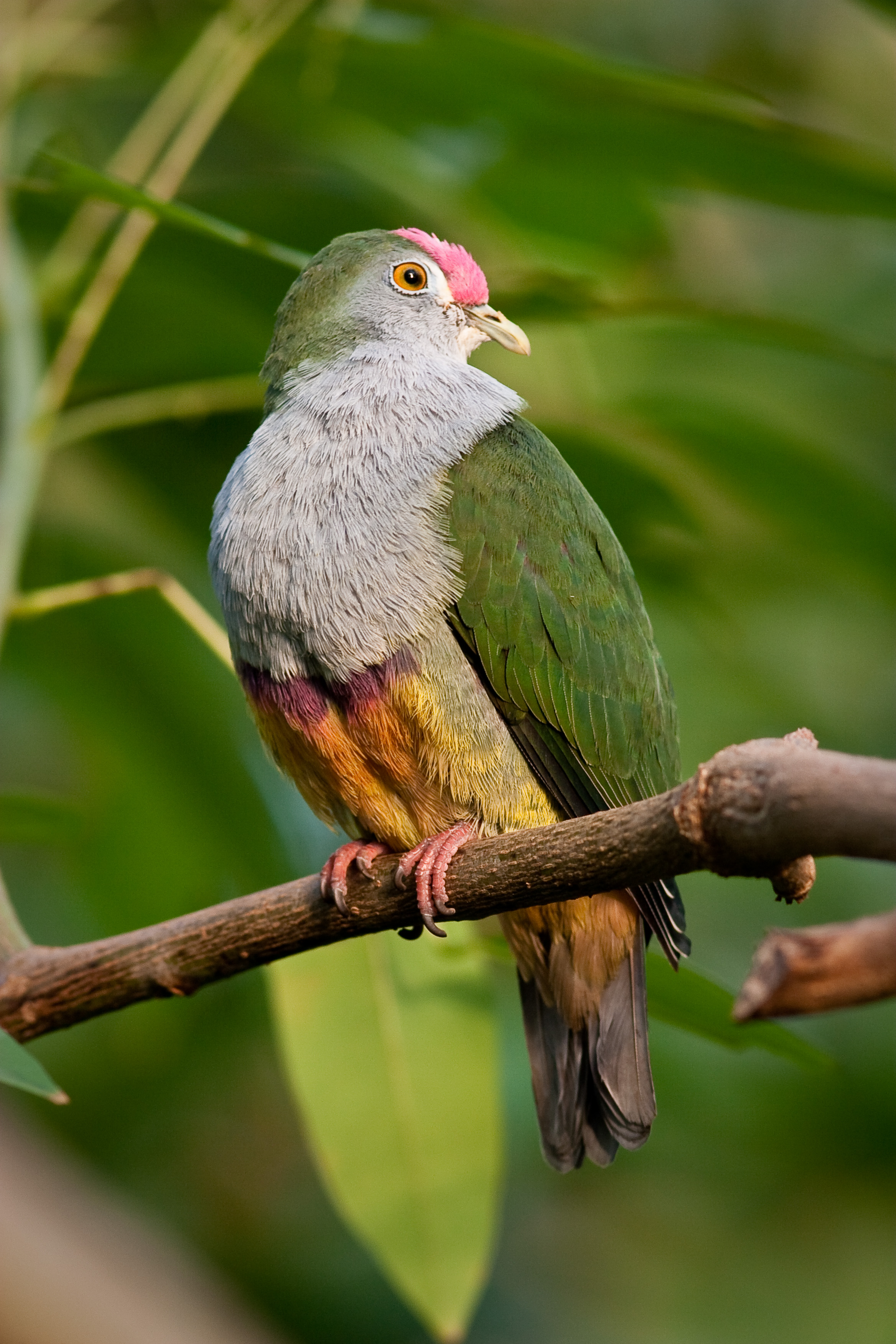
- At Artis Zoo, Netherlands

Conservation status
- Least Concern (IUCN 3.1)

Scientific classification
- Kingdom: Animalia
- Phylum: Chordata
- Class: Aves
- Order: Columbiformes
- Family: Columbidae
- Genus: Ptilinopus
- Species: P. pulchellus

Binomial name
- Ptilinopus pulchellus (Temminck, 1835)

= Beautiful fruit dove =

Species of bird

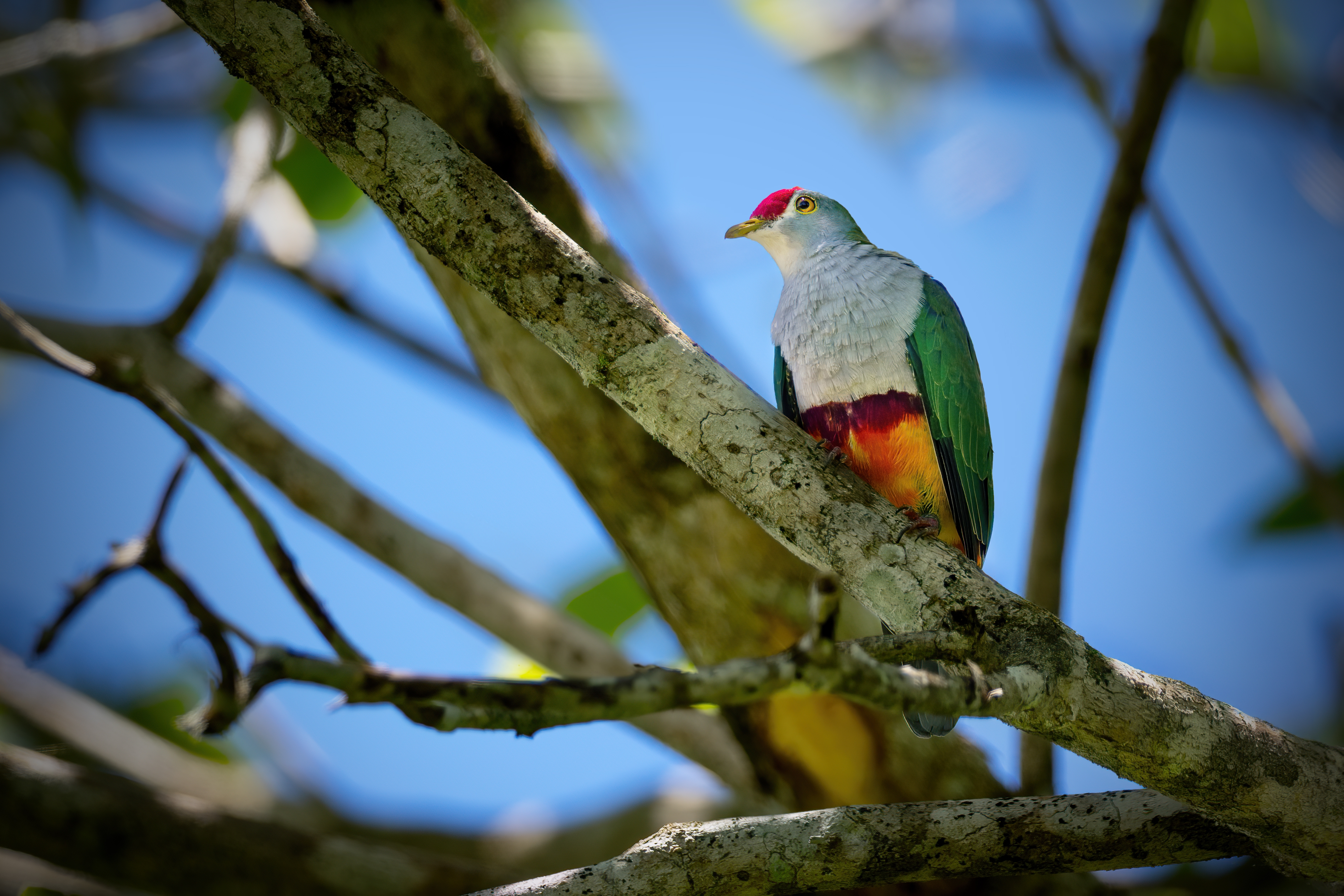
Wild on Waigeo

The beautiful fruit dove (Ptilinopus pulchellus), also known as the rose-fronted pigeon or crimson-capped fruit dove, is a small, approximately 19 cm (7 1/2 in) long, mainly green fruit dove. It has a red crown, whitish throat, a greenish-yellow bill and purplish-red feet. It has a blue-grey breast and yellowish orange belly, with a reddish purple patch in between. Both sexes are similar.

The beautiful fruit dove is distributed in rainforests of New Guinea and the islands of Batanta, Waigeo, Salawati and Misool in West Papua, Indonesia, primarily in flat terrain. The female usually lays a single white egg.

Its diet consists mainly of various fruits from trees, palms and vines. In the Port Moresby area, birds were found to eat a mixed diet in May. Large Tristiropsis canarioides fruit were taken when available, but the species gets displaced from fruiting trees by larger pigeons such as the collared imperial pigeon (Ducula mullerii). Small Endiandra sp. fruit were very often eaten, but made up only a small quantity of food volume. Other food were Gymnacranthera paniculata and small quantities of Polyalthia sp., Livistona palm fruit, and occasionally pepper (Piper) berries. Despite their small size, they are able to swallow fruits of 5 cm³ volume, which would translate into a diameter of about 2 cm in spherical fruit. (Frith et al. 1976)

Widespread and common throughout its large range, the beautiful fruit dove is evaluated as Least Concern on the IUCN Red List of Threatened Species.
