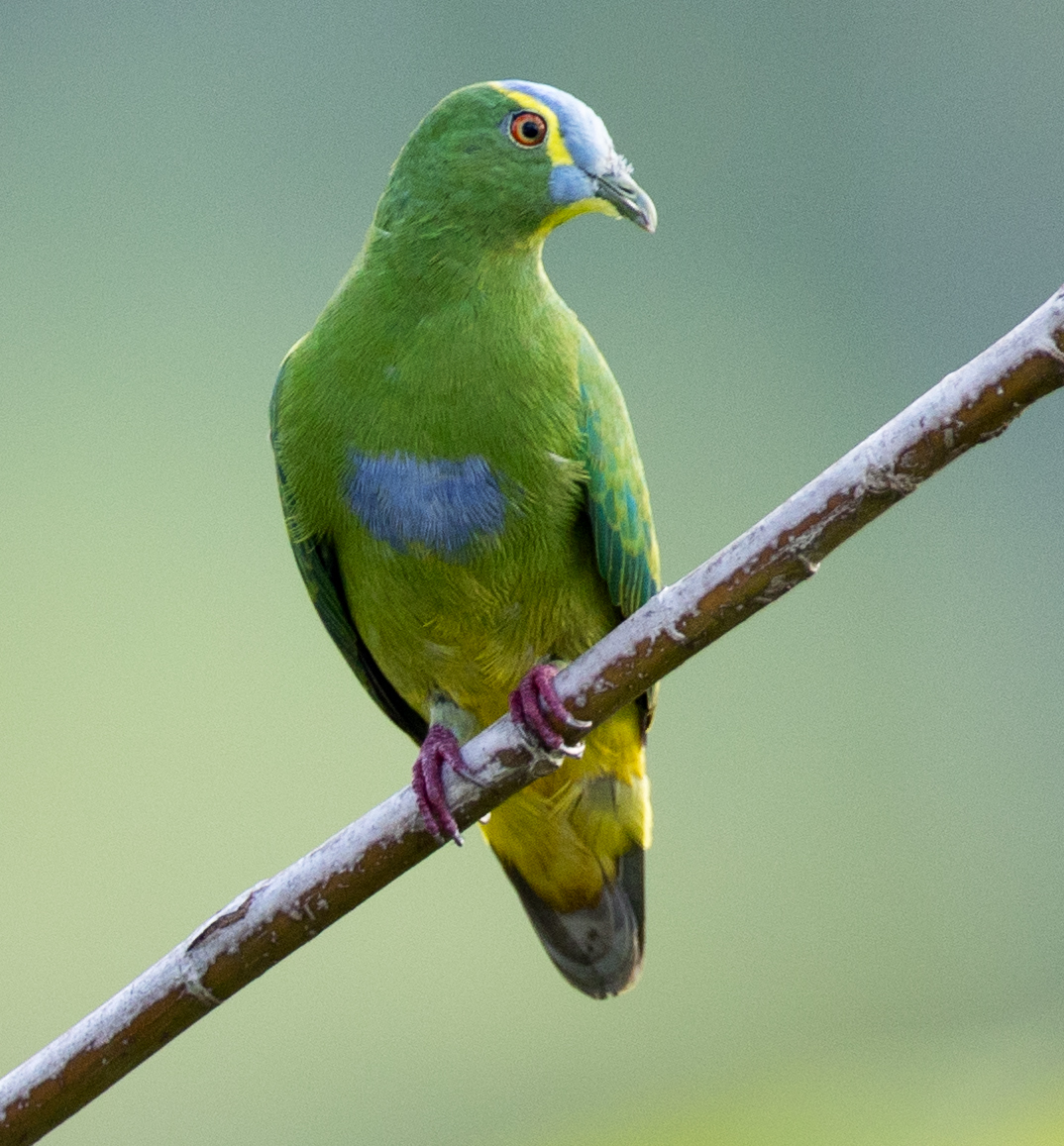

Conservation status
- Least Concern (IUCN 3.1)

Scientific classification
- Kingdom: Animalia
- Phylum: Chordata
- Class: Aves
- Order: Columbiformes
- Family: Columbidae
- Genus: Ptilinopus
- Species: P. monacha

Binomial name
- Ptilinopus monacha (Temminck, 1824)

= Blue-capped fruit dove =

Blue-capped Fruit-Dove

Species of bird

The blue-capped fruit dove (Ptilinopus monacha) is a species of bird in the family Columbidae. It is endemic to the northern Maluku Islands.

Its natural habitats are subtropical or tropical moist lowland forests, subtropical or tropical mangrove forests, and rural gardens. It is threatened by habitat loss.
