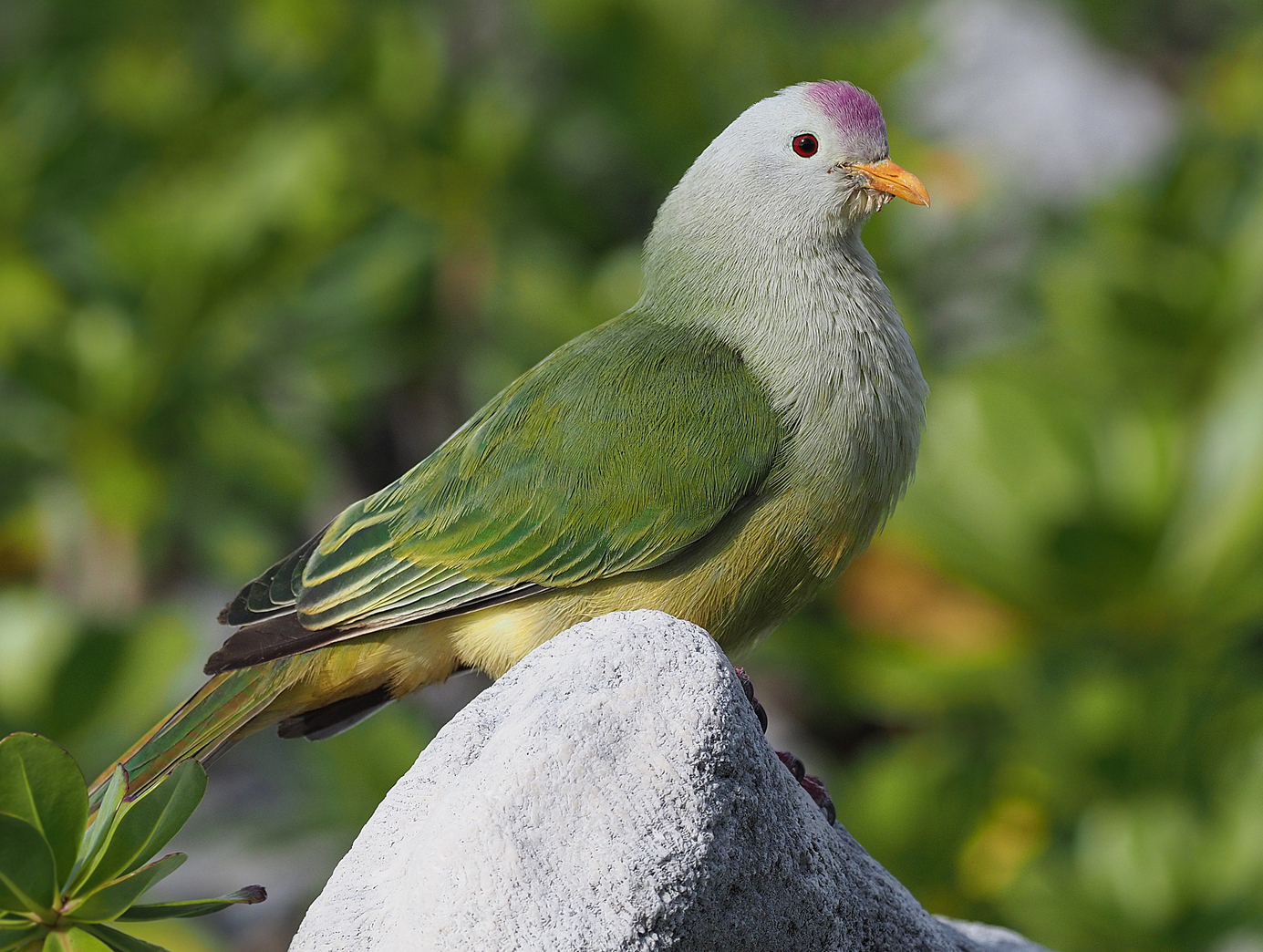

Conservation status
- Near Threatened (IUCN 3.1)

Scientific classification
- Kingdom: Animalia
- Phylum: Chordata
- Class: Aves
- Order: Columbiformes
- Family: Columbidae
- Genus: Ptilinopus
- Species: P. coralensis

Binomial name
- Ptilinopus coralensis Peale, 1849

= Atoll fruit dove =

Species of bird

The atoll fruit dove (Ptilinopus coralensis) is a species of bird in the family Columbidae. It is endemic to the Tuamotu archipelago in French Polynesia. Its natural habitats are subtropical or tropical moist lowland forests and plantations. It is threatened by habitat loss.

== Distribution and population ==
The atoll fruit dove is widespread throughout the islands of the Tuamotu Archipelago, French Polynesia. In a 1999 survey it was found to be uncommon on five out of eight islands visited, but others have found it to be abundant on some atolls which have remained free from the ravages of introduced predators.

== Ecology ==
The atoll fruit dove is the world's only dove in the tropical Pacific that has adapted exclusively to low coral atolls. It lives in forests and abandoned coconut plantations. It mainly feeds on insects and seeds, usually on the ground. This species also eats the leaves of the "tafano" or "kahaia" (Guettarda speciosa ) trees with odorous flowers.

== Threats ==
The atoll fruit dove is threatened by predation by rats that have established colonies on a small number of islands were this lives. The species is also vulnerable to habitat destruction due to deforestation and the destruction of old, abandoned coconut plantations. The species is rather tame and is rare in inhabited areas making hunting a possible threat.
