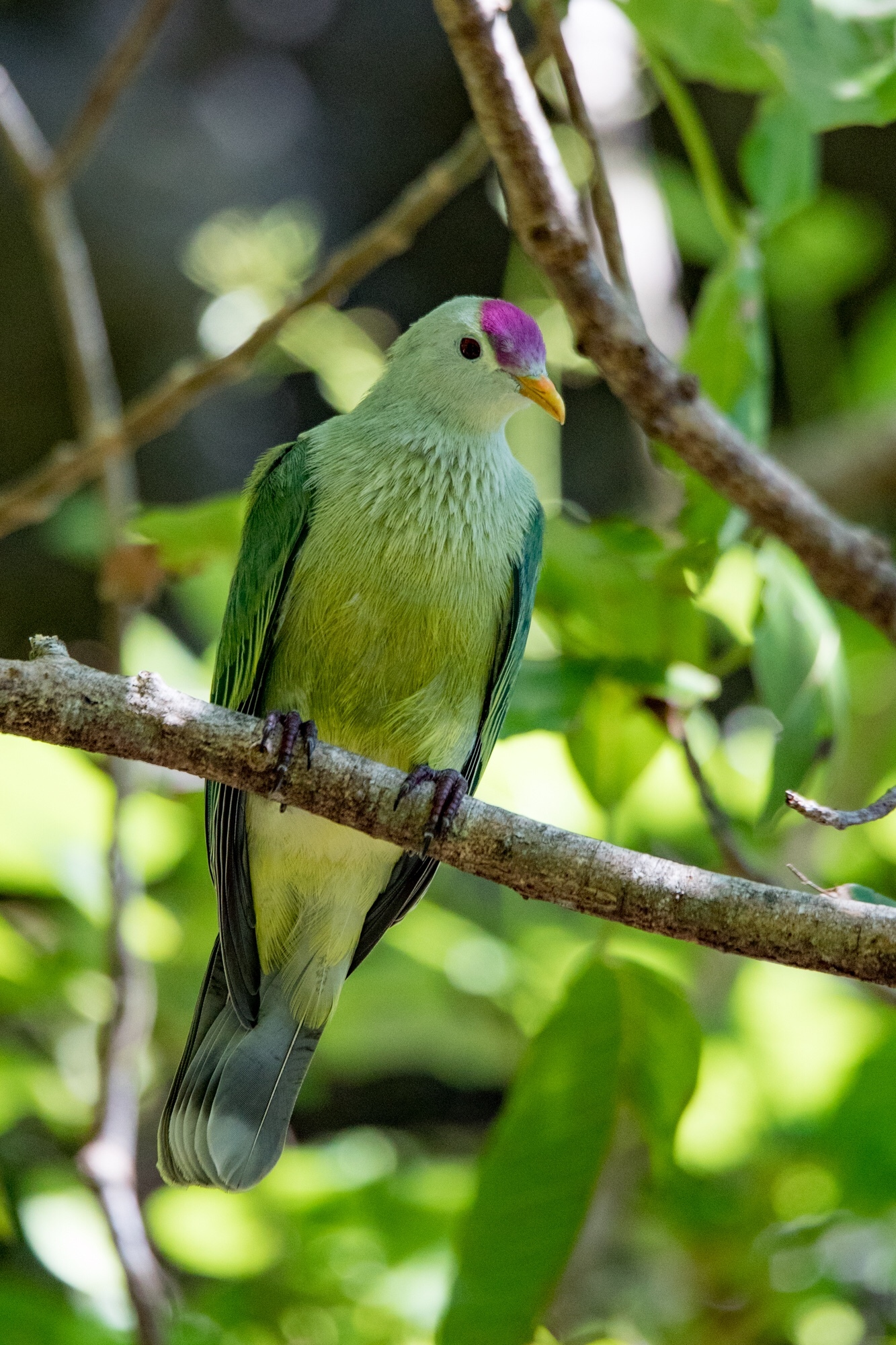

Conservation status
- Vulnerable (IUCN 3.1)

Scientific classification
- Kingdom: Animalia
- Phylum: Chordata
- Class: Aves
- Order: Columbiformes
- Family: Columbidae
- Genus: Ptilinopus
- Species: P. chalcurus

Binomial name
- Ptilinopus chalcurus Gray, 1860

= Makatea fruit dove =

Species of bird

The Makatea fruit dove (Ptilinopus chalcurus) is a species of bird in the family Columbidae. It is endemic to French Polynesian raised coral atoll of Makatea in the Tuamotu Archipelago. Its natural habitat is subtropical or tropical moist lowland forests and is also present near villages. This bird is approximately 20 cm (7.9 in) tall and has plumage of mostly green feathers with a dark purple crown and forehead, pale greenish-grey throat and chest, cloven lower chest feathers producing rows of shadows that appear as streaks, yellow underparts, tinged orange anteriorly. The bird's wing feathers are edged yellow. While it continues to be threatened by habitat loss, a decrease in mining since the mid 1960s has helped re-vegetation and appears to have stabilized population numbers.

== Taxonomy ==
The Makatea fruit dove form part of the Animalia kingdom, Chordata phylum, Aves class, in the Columbiformes order, Columbidae family and the Ptilinopus Genus

== Description ==
The average length of the Makatea fruit dove is 20 cm tall (8 inches). It has primarily green feathers on its plumage, with a deep purple head and forehead, a pale greenish-gray neck and chest, cloven bottom chest feathers that create streaks of shadow, yellow belly, and an orange tint on the front. The feathers on the bird's wings have a golden edge.

== Distribution and habitat ==
The Makatea fruit dove is peculiar to the Tuamotu Archipelago's Makatea island in French Polynesia. The species is common over Makatea Island's woods and forested areas, even in places near settlements. The island of Makatea is very small, measuring only twenty-eight square kilometres (11 sq mi). Phosphate mining had an important impact on the island's forest cover, resulting in the loss of more than half of its woods. A large portion of this destroyed environment has naturally recovered throughout the last 40 years. The species is isolated to a single tiny island, so even with its comeback, it remains endangered. There is habitat loss and the arrival of invading predators. Its native habitat is wet lowland woods in subtropical or tropical regions; it may also be found close to settlements. Although habitat degradation remains a problem, reduced mining since the mid-1960s has assisted in re-vegetation and seems to have stabilized population levels. The species occupies a wide range of forested settings over the raised coastal island of Makatea. It is typically found in both open, accessible areas and heavily wooded ones. This bird, which is commonly spotted in towns and other populated areas of the island, has adjusted well to environments that have been changed by humans. Its existence in both inhabited and wild places shows its ability to adapt to a variety of environments and its ability to make use of the resources available nearby. Even with its adaptability, it still heavily relies on the island's woods, which are crucial to its continued existence.

== Diet ==
It is known for this dove species to eat insects, seeds and fruits of the Cananga odorata and Ficus prolixa which are tropical trees.

== Reproduction ==
During the rainy season, from October to February, the Makatea Fruit-dove reproduces using the usual bird mating pattern. The mating pattern is a way that males and females pair up to reproduce. In order to attract females, men have a technique that includes vocalizations and puffed out breasts. After mating, the female uses leaves and twigs to build a nest in dense vegetation which is a collection of plants that are tightly packed together with little to no clear spaces in between them. The male may help with the eggs' incubation which is the process of maintaining the right conditions for an egg to develop and hatch. It takes 14 to 18 days for them to hatch. The chicks are born naked and defenseless. Before they can fly, they must rely on the parents for food and protection for around 15 to 20 days. After that, they progressively become more independent but continue to seek direction from them.
