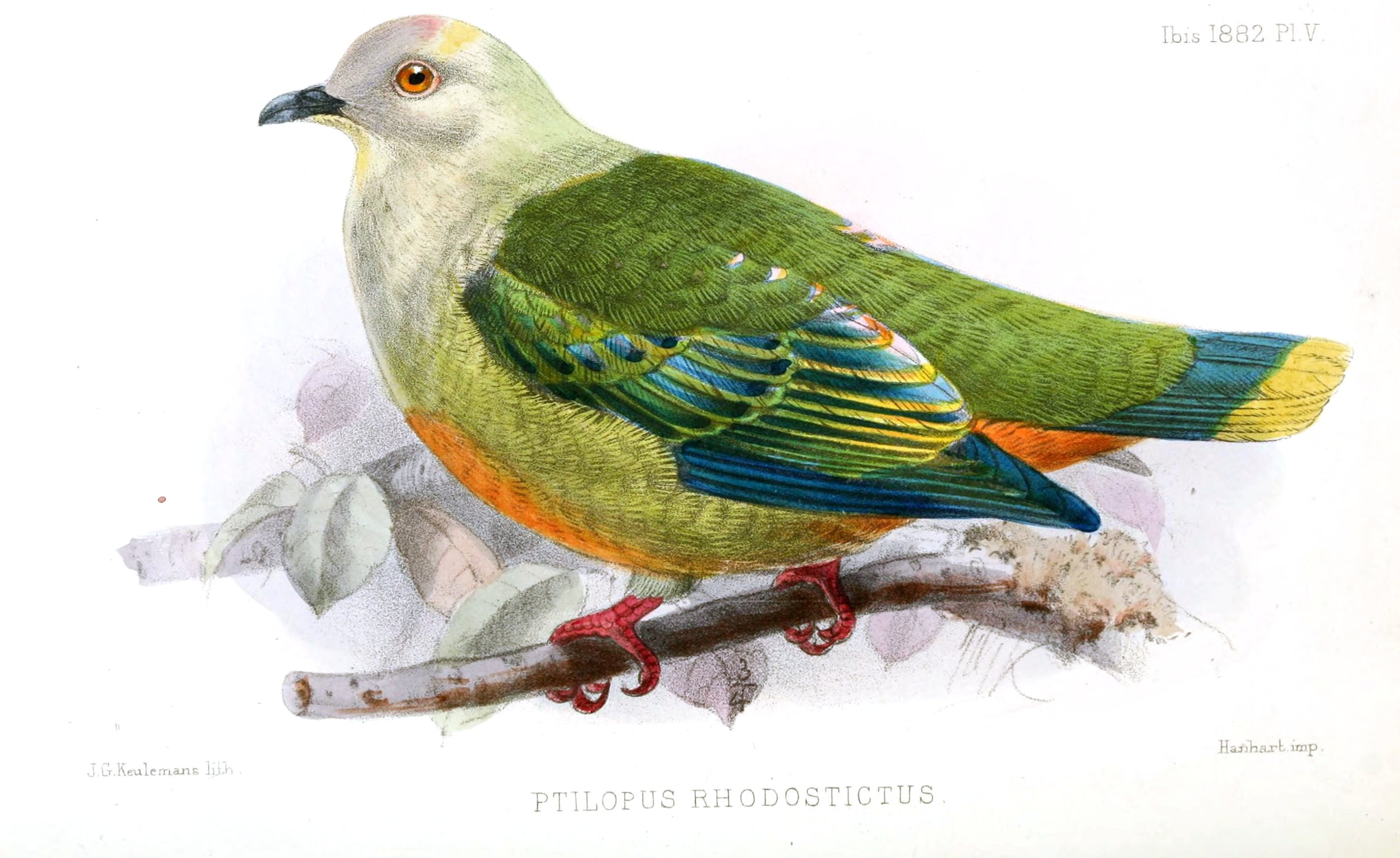

Conservation status
- Least Concern (IUCN 3.1)

Scientific classification
- Kingdom: Animalia
- Phylum: Chordata
- Class: Aves
- Order: Columbiformes
- Family: Columbidae
- Genus: Ptilinopus
- Species: P. richardsii

Binomial name
- Ptilinopus richardsii Ramsay, 1882

= Silver-capped fruit dove =

Species of bird

The silver-capped fruit dove (Ptilinopus richardsii) is a species of bird in the family Columbidae. It is endemic to Solomon Islands.

Its natural habitat is subtropical or tropical moist lowland forests.

== Taxonomy and systematics ==
=== Subspecies ===
- P. r. richardsii – Ramsay, 1882: The nominate subspecies, found on Ugi and Santa Anna.
- P. r. cyanopterus – Mayr, 1931: Found on Rennell Island and Bellona Island.
