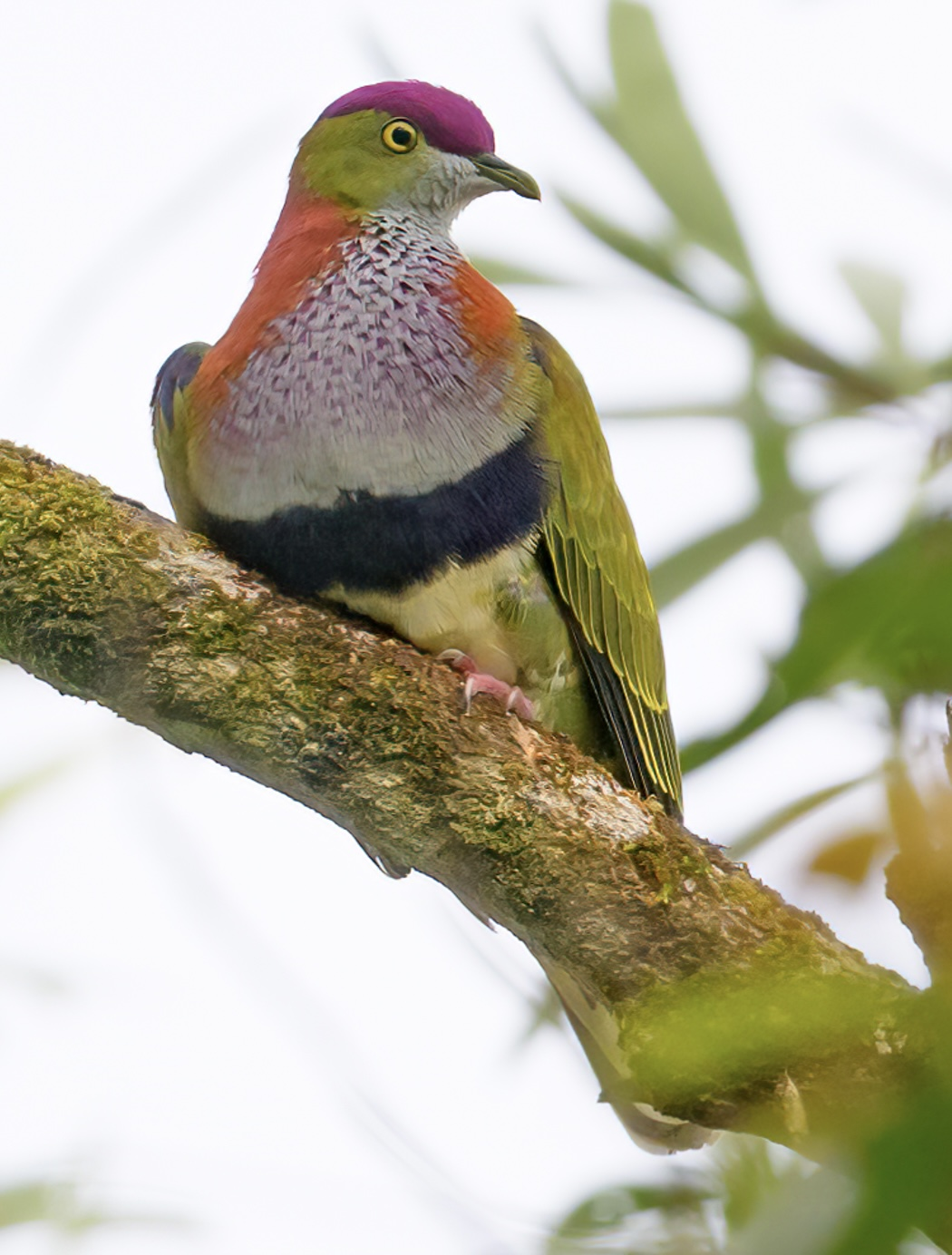
- Superb fruit dove, Ptilinopus superbus

Scientific classification
- Kingdom: Animalia
- Phylum: Chordata
- Class: Aves
- Order: Columbiformes
- Family: Columbidae
- Tribe: Ptilinopodini
- Genus: Ptilinopus; Swainson, 1825

Type species
- Ptilinopus regina (rose-crowned fruit dove) Swainson, 1825

Species
- See text

Synonyms
- Chrysoena; Jotreron Bonaparte, 1854; Iotreron Gould, 1856

= Fruit dove =

Genus of birds

The fruit doves, also known as fruit pigeons, are a genus (Ptilinopus) of birds in the pigeon and dove family (Columbidae). These colourful, frugivorous doves are found in forests and woodlands in Southeast Asia and Oceania. It is a large genus with nearly 50 species, some threatened or already extinct. This genus formerly included two fruit doves that are now placed in the genus Megaloprepia and nine fruit doves that are now placed in the genus Ramphiculus.

== Taxonomy ==
The genus Ptilinopus was introduced in 1825 by the English naturalist William Swainson with the rose-crowned fruit dove (Ptilinopus regina) as the type species. The genus name combines the Ancient Greek words πτίλον ptilon meaning "down feather" with πούς pous meaning "foot".

The many species of this genus can be further grouped by geography and by certain shared characteristics. The fruit doves of the Sunda Islands and northern Australia, such as the pink-headed fruit dove and banded fruit dove, have comparatively longer tails than other species, and are notable for their solid colouration on the head, neck and breast, with a black band across the belly. Another grouping can be made of certain fruit doves endemic to New Guinea, the Moluccas, and the Bismarck Archipelago, including the carunculated fruit dove, knob-billed fruit dove, and others; these are notable for their grey colouration on the head or shoulder and/or enlarged cere (part of the bill). This group is uncharacteristically not sexually dimorphic, meaning males and females look alike. The orange dove, golden dove, and whistling dove, all endemic to Fiji and sometimes placed in their own genus Chrysoena, have in common their small size, compact shape, yellow or orange colouration in the males, and hair-like body feathers. They also are known for their rather un-pigeon-like vocalizations, which sound like snapping, barking, or whistling, respectively. Finally, the Pacific Islands provide homes to a number of species that share generally green colouration with crimson caps or crowns, ventriloquial cooing or hooting, and a distinct texture of the breast feathers.

A molecular study published in 2010 found that the genus Ptilinopus was paraphyletic with the genera Alectroenas containing the blue pigeons and Drepanoptila containing the cloven-feathered dove embedded within it. This result was confirmed by a more comprehensive study of the fruit doves by Alice Cibois and collaborators that was published in 2014. Rather than expanding Ptilinopus to include the morphologically distinct blue pigeons, the genus has been split with two species moved to the resurrected genus Megaloprepia and nine species moved to the resurrected genus Ramphiculus. Even after these changes, genetic evidence indicates that Ptilinopus remains paraphyletic. Cibois and collaborators proposed resurrecting an additional genus, Chrysoena, but in their analysis the statistical support for some of the nodes was weak and this proposal has not been generally adopted.

=== Species ===
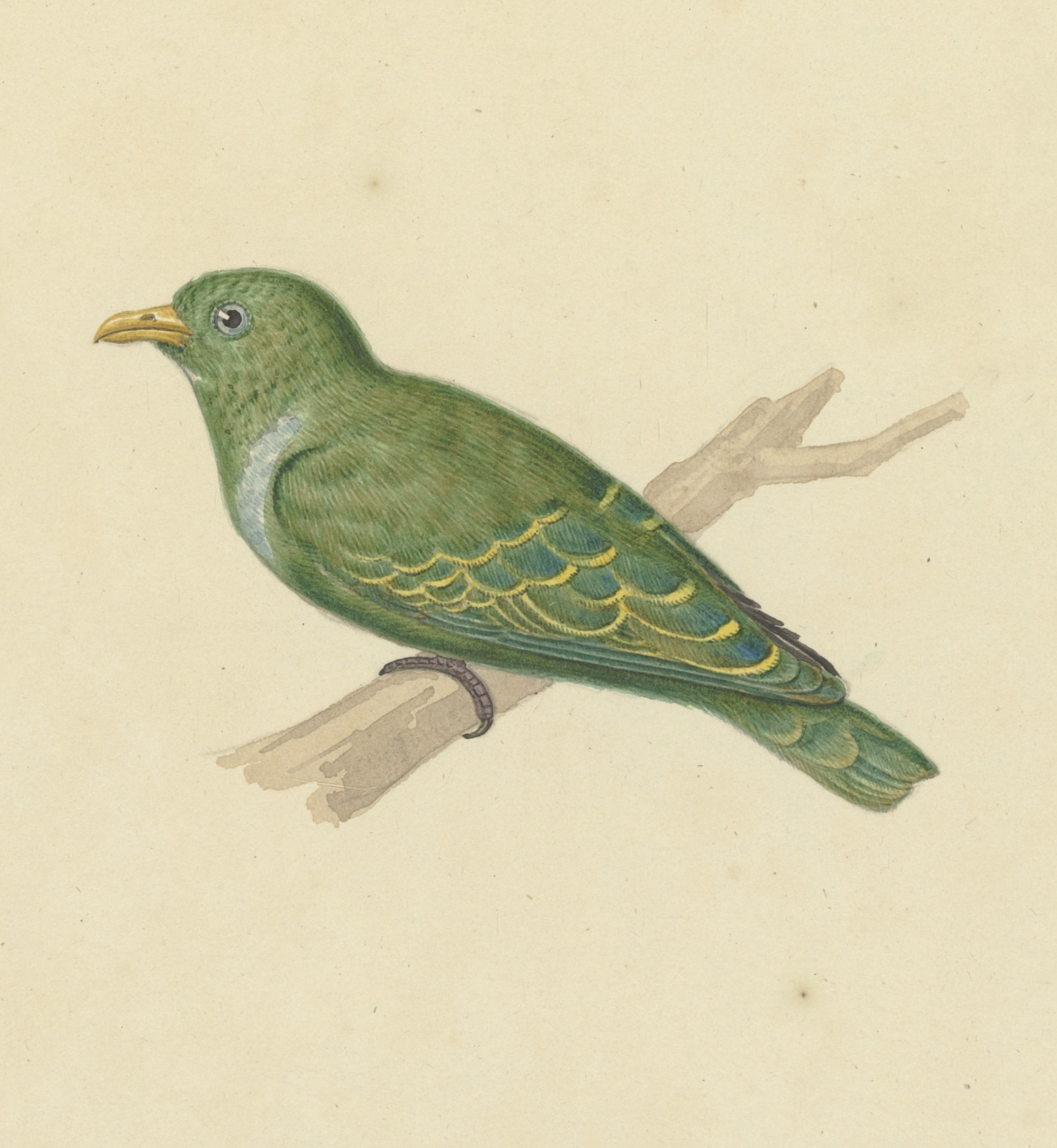
Dwarf fruit dove (Ptilinopus nainus), Lobo, New Guinea, 1828

The genus contains 47 species.

- Banded fruit dove, Ptilinopus cinctus – Bali and Lesser Sunda Islands
- Black-banded fruit dove, Ptilinopus alligator – north-central Australia (western escarpment of Arnhem Land)
- Red-naped fruit dove, Ptilinopus dohertyi – forest of Sumba (western Lesser Sunda Islands)
- Pink-headed fruit dove, Ptilinopus porphyreus – montane forest of southern Sumatra, Java, and Bali
- Pink-spotted fruit dove, Ptilinopus perlatus – New Guinea and many satellites
- Ornate fruit dove, Ptilinopus ornatus – New Guinea
- Tanna fruit dove, Ptilinopus tannensis – Vanuatu including Banks Islands
- Orange-fronted fruit dove, Ptilinopus aurantiifrons – New Guinea, including Raja Ampat Islands (off western New Guinea), Aru Islands (off southwestern New Guinea), Yapen (Cenderawasih Bay, off northwestern New Guinea), and D'Entrecasteaux Archipelago (off southeastern New Guinea)
- Wallace's fruit dove, Ptilinopus wallacii – southern Moluccas including Kai Islands, and lowlands of southwestern New Guinea, including Aru Islands (off southwestern New Guinea)
- Superb fruit dove, Ptilinopus superbus – Sulawesi to east Australia, Bismarck Archipelago and central east Solomon Islands
- Many-colored fruit dove, Ptilinopus perousii – Fiji (southwest Polynesia), Tonga and Samoa (central Polynesia)
- Purple-capped fruit dove, Ptilinopus ponapensis – Caroline Islands (Chuuk and Pohnpei)
- Kosrae fruit dove, Ptilinopus hernsheimi – Kosrae (eastern Caroline Islands)
- Crimson-crowned fruit dove, Ptilinopus porphyraceus – islets of Fiji (southwest Polynesia), Wallis and Futuna (northeast of Fiji), Tonga, Samoa and Niue (central Polynesia)
- Palau fruit dove, Ptilinopus pelewensis – Palau (Babelthuap to Angaur; western Caroline Islands, western Micronesia)
- Lilac-crowned fruit dove, Ptilinopus rarotongensis – Rarotonga and Atiu (south Cook Islands, east Polynesia)
- Mariana fruit dove, Ptilinopus roseicapilla – Mariana Islands (Saipan, Tinian, Agiguan, Rota, and Guam)
- Rose-crowned fruit dove, Ptilinopus regina – central, east Lesser Sunda Islands and north, east Australia
- Silver-capped fruit dove, Ptilinopus richardsii – south Solomon Islands
- Raiatea fruit dove, Ptilinopus chrysogaster – western Society Islands (Bora Bora, Tahaʻa, Huahine, and Maupiti)
- Grey-green fruit dove, Ptilinopus purpuratus – east Society Islands (east Polynesia)
- Makatea fruit dove, Ptilinopus chalcurus – Makatea Island (western Tuamotu Archipelago)
- Atoll fruit dove, Ptilinopus coralensis – larger islands in Tuamotu Archipelago (except Makatea)
- Red-bellied fruit dove, Ptilinopus greyi – Ndai (south-central Solomon Islands), Temotu (southeastern Solomon Islands), and Vanuatu to New Caledonia (including Loyalty Islands)
- Rapa fruit dove, Ptilinopus huttoni – Rapa Iti (Austral Archipelago); seriously endangered
- White-capped fruit dove, Ptilinopus dupetithouarsii – Marquesas Islands (northeast Polynesia)
- †Red-moustached fruit dove, Ptilinopus mercierii – Marquesas Islands (northeast Polynesia)
- Henderson fruit dove, Ptilinopus insularis – Henderson Island (central Pitcairn Islands group, southeastern Polynesia)
- Coroneted fruit dove, Ptilinopus coronulatus – New Guinea and satellites
- Beautiful fruit dove, Ptilinopus pulchellus – New Guinea including western Papuan islands
- Blue-capped fruit dove, Ptilinopus monacha – Morotai to Obi Islands (northern Moluccas) and Damar Island (northeastern Lesser Sunda Islands)
- White-bibbed fruit dove, Ptilinopus rivoli – central, south Moluccas, New Guinea and satellites and Bismarck Archipelago
- Geelvink fruit dove, Ptilinopus speciosus – Numfor, Biak, and Yapen (Cenderawasih Bay, off northwestern New Guinea)
- Yellow-bibbed fruit dove, Ptilinopus solomonensis – Bismarck Archipelago and Solomon Islands
- Claret-breasted fruit dove, Ptilinopus viridis – central Moluccas, Bird's Head Peninsula (northwest New Guinea), north coastal New Guinea and satellites and Solomon Islands
- White-headed fruit dove, Ptilinopus eugeniae – Makira and satellite islands (southeastern Solomon Islands)
- Orange-bellied fruit dove, Ptilinopus iozonus – New Guinea and many satellites
- Knob-billed fruit dove, Ptilinopus insolitus – Bismarck Archipelago except Admiralty Islands
- Grey-headed fruit dove, Ptilinopus hyogastrus – northern Moluccas (Morotai, Halmahera, Bacan Islands, Tidore, and Ternate)
- Carunculated fruit dove, Ptilinopus granulifrons – Obi Islands (north-central Moluccas)
- Black-naped fruit dove, Ptilinopus melanospilus – Java region, west, central Lesser Sunda Islands, Sulawesi region and south Philippines
- Dwarf fruit dove, Ptilinopus nainus – lowlands of New Guinea (except for northwestern New Guinea and north coast of southeastern New Guinea), also Raja Ampat islands (off western New Guinea)
- Negros fruit dove, Ptilinopus arcanus – Negros (known from a 1953 specimen from Mount Canlaon)
- Orange dove, Ptilinopus victor – central north Fiji (southwest Polynesia)
- Golden dove, Ptilinopus luteovirens – western Fiji (Waya Group, Viti Levu, Beqa, Ovalau, and Gau)
- Whistling dove, Ptilinopus layardi – southwestern Fiji (Kadavu Island and Ono)
- Cloven-feathered dove, Ptilinopus holosericea – New Caledonia and Île des Pins

== Description ==
These small- to medium-sized doves generally have short, fan-shaped tails, and are remarkable for their colourful and often glossy plumage, as evidenced in the aptly named orange fruit dove, flame-breasted fruit dove, and pink-headed fruit dove. Males and females of many fruit dove species look very different. For example, the female many-colored fruit dove shares the male's crimson crown and deep pink undertail feathers, but is otherwise green, whereas the male has a crimson on the upper back and has areas of yellow, olive, cinnamon, and grey.

== Distribution and habitat ==
This is a large genus, most diverse in and around the island of New Guinea, in the Philippines, and in the biogeographical region of Wallacea. Some species have ranges as far west as the Sunda Islands, others north to Taiwan, south to Australia, and east into Polynesia.

== Behaviour and ecology ==
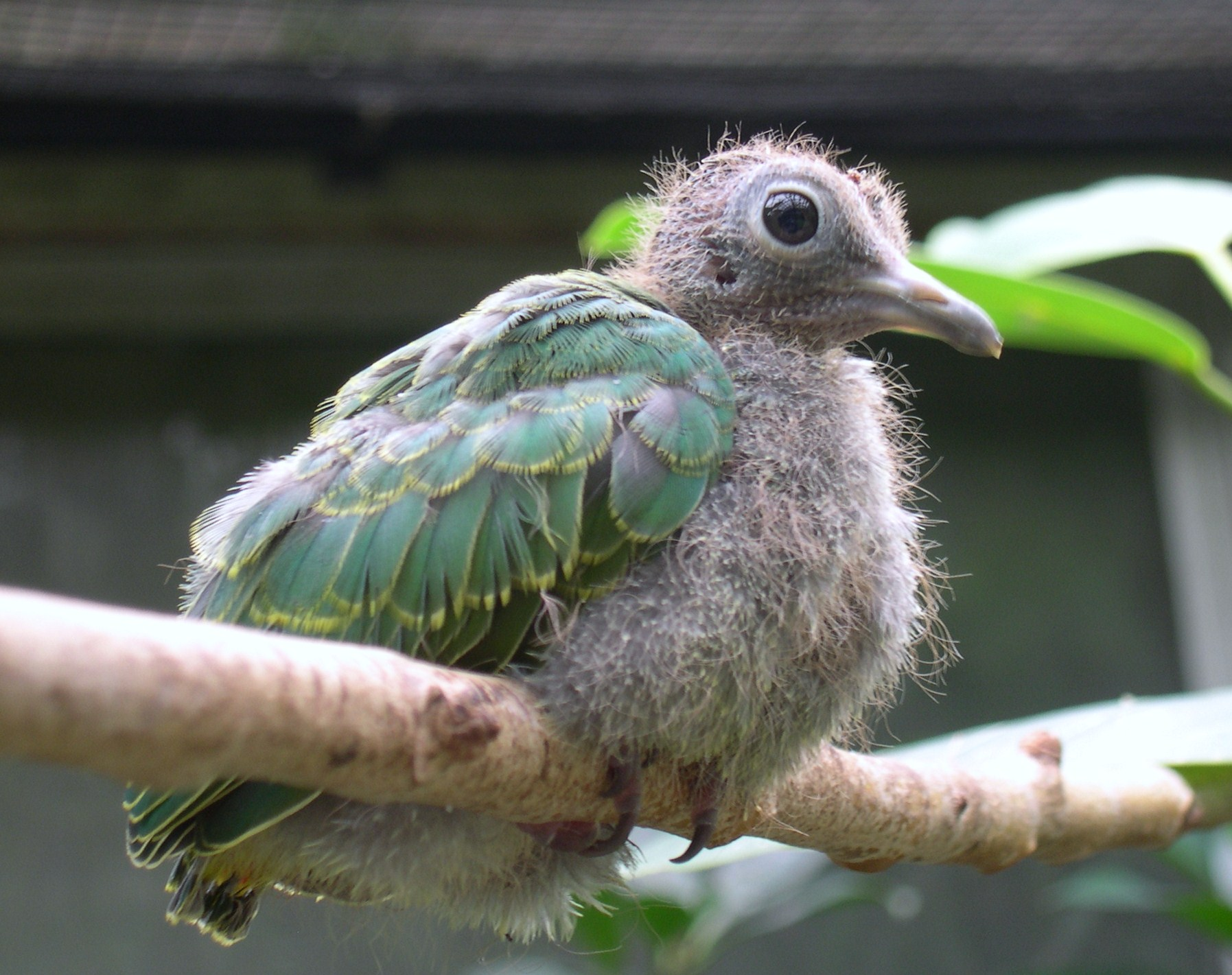
Chick of a black-naped fruit dove (Ptilinopus melanospilus)

Fruit doves, as their name implies, eat fruit. Ficus is especially important. They live in various kinds of forest or woodland. Some species are restricted to primary forest, such as lowland rainforest, montane forest, or monsoon forest, while others prefer secondary forest or disturbed areas. Some species specialize in particular habitats, from lowland coastal forest to the cloud forest or moss forest of high altitudes. Some species of fruit doves are only found in habitats dominated by particular plants, such as mangrove, eucalyptus, or pandanus. Only a few species can commonly be seen around human habitation, these include the knob-billed fruit dove, Makatea fruit dove, and black-naped fruit dove, which are known to visit gardens and such.

Much is still to be learned about fruit doves. Many species are shy and difficult to observe in their natural habitat. For example, there are several species in the Philippines, and for most of them, little or nothing is known of their breeding or nesting behavior.
