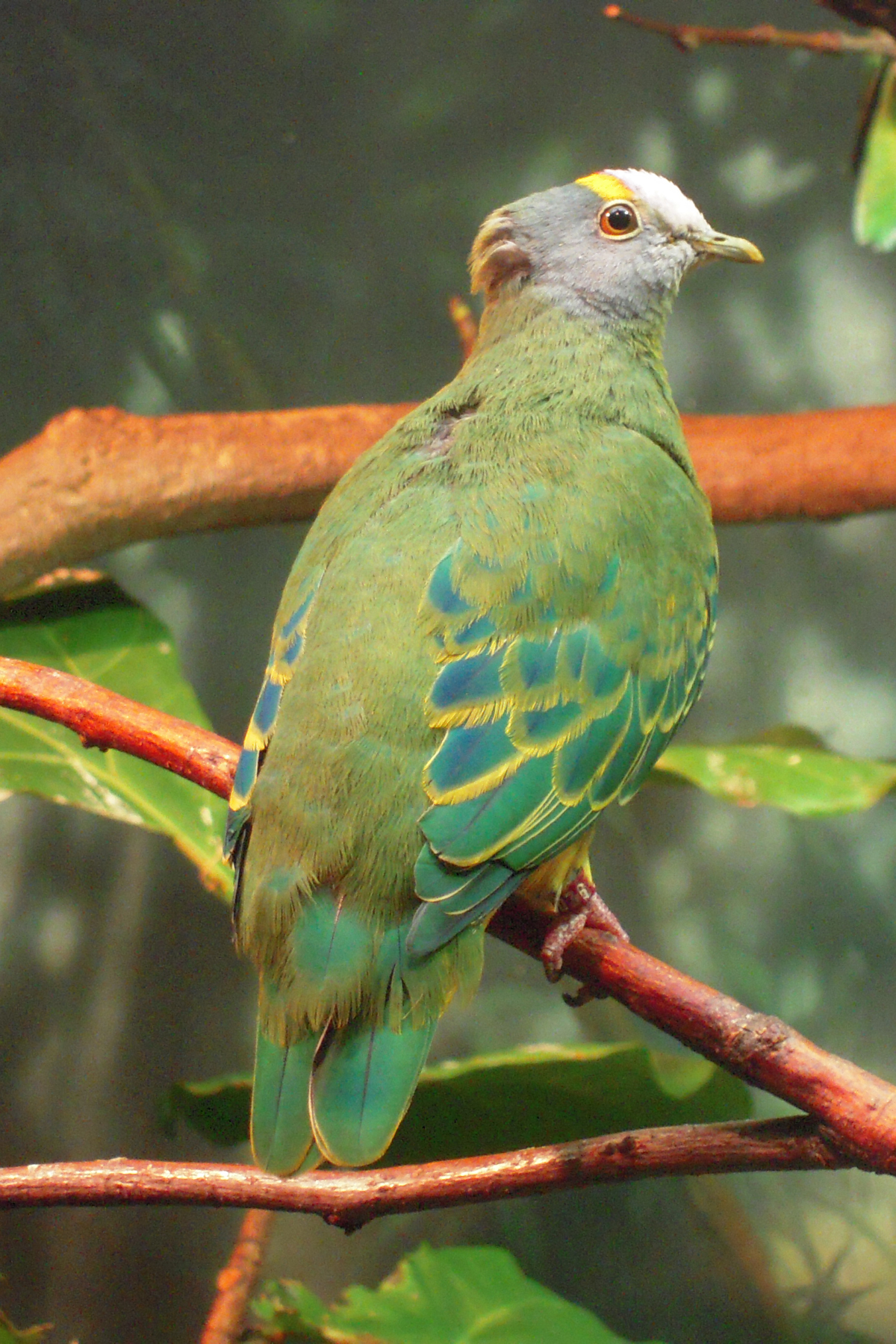
- At Central Park Zoo, USA

Conservation status
- Least Concern (IUCN 3.1)

Scientific classification
- Kingdom: Animalia
- Phylum: Chordata
- Class: Aves
- Order: Columbiformes
- Family: Columbidae
- Genus: Ptilinopus
- Species: P. coronulatus

Binomial name
- Ptilinopus coronulatus Gray, 1858

= Coroneted fruit dove =

Species of bird

The coroneted fruit dove (Ptilinopus coronulatus), also known as the lilac-capped fruit dove, is a species of bird in the family Columbidae. It is found in New Guinea. Its natural habitats are subtropical or tropical dry forests and subtropical or tropical moist lowland forests, particularly in hilly terrain. The bird is characterised by a distinctive crest or "coronet" of feathers on its head and has a distinctive, low-pitched call. The Coroneted Fruit Dove is a brightly coloured bird with a green head, neck and breast, and a yellow belly.
