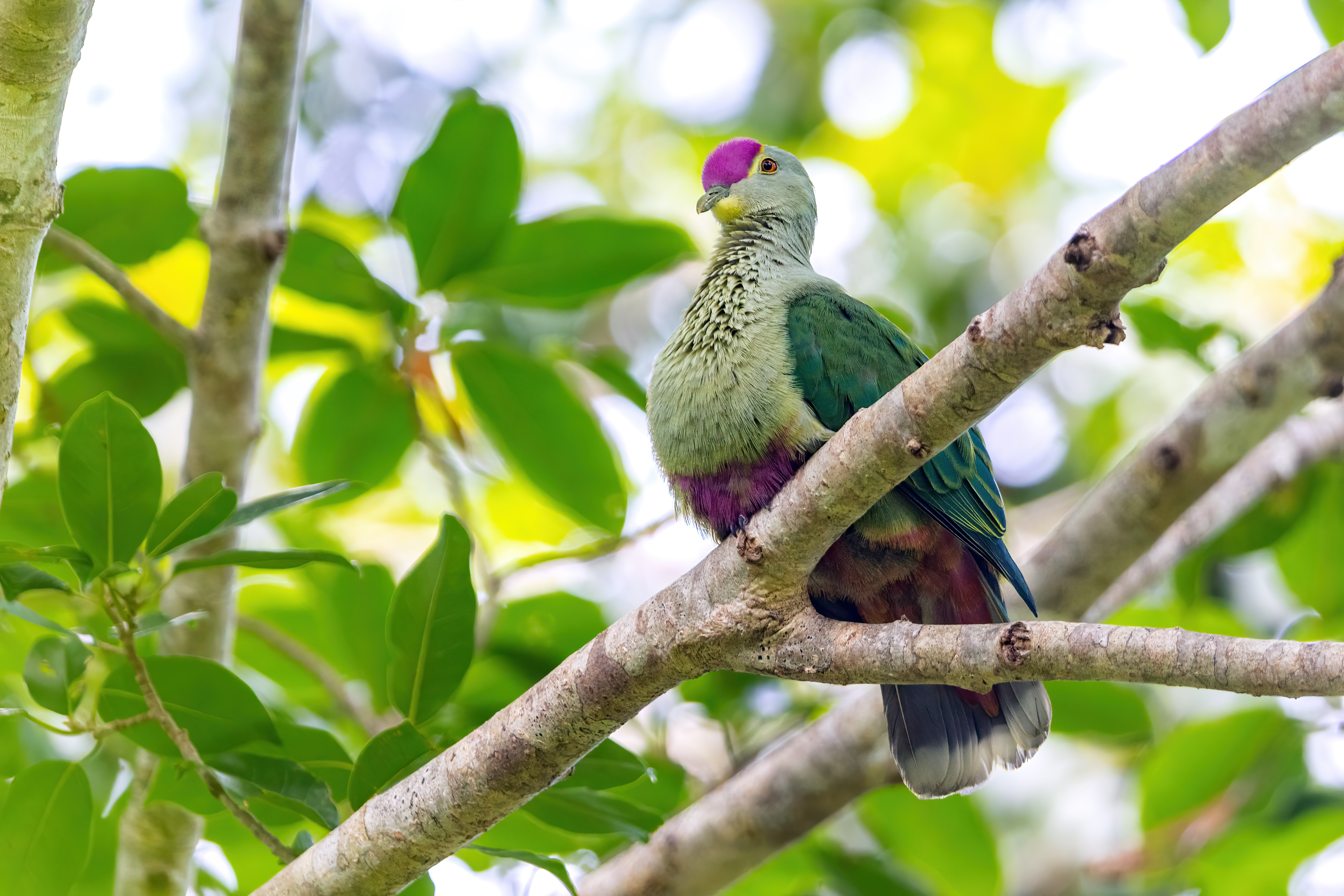
- Adult on the main island of New Caledonia

Conservation status
- Least Concern (IUCN 3.1)

Scientific classification
- Kingdom: Animalia
- Phylum: Chordata
- Class: Aves
- Order: Columbiformes
- Family: Columbidae
- Genus: Ptilinopus
- Species: P. greyi

Binomial name
- Ptilinopus greyi Bonaparte, 1857

Synonyms
- Ptilinopus greyii

= Red-bellied fruit dove =

Species of bird

The red-bellied fruit dove (Ptilinopus greyi) is a species of bird in the family Columbidae. It is found in lowland forest in New Caledonia, Santa Cruz Islands (Solomons), and Vanuatu, and it is common in most of its range.

The red-bellied fruit dove is overall green, but has a purplish-red crown and patch on the central belly. Adults of the two sexes are very similar, although the belly patch is slightly smaller in the female. Juveniles essentially lack the pinkish-red patch on the belly and crown, leading to potential confusion with the Tanna fruit dove.
