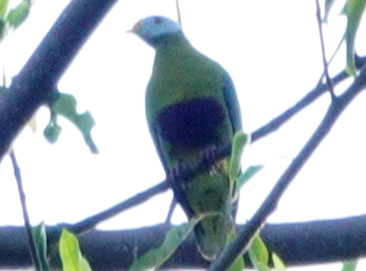

Conservation status
- Vulnerable (IUCN 3.1)

Scientific classification
- Kingdom: Animalia
- Phylum: Chordata
- Class: Aves
- Order: Columbiformes
- Family: Columbidae
- Genus: Ptilinopus
- Species: P. granulifrons

Binomial name
- Ptilinopus granulifrons Hartert, 1898

= Carunculated fruit dove =

Species of bird

The carunculated fruit dove (Ptilinopus granulifrons) is a species of bird in the pigeon and dove family Columbidae. It is endemic to Obi (or Obira) in the northern Maluku Islands (Moluccas), Indonesia.

Its natural habitats are subtropical or tropical moist lowland forests, subtropical or tropical moist shrubland, and arable land. It is threatened by habitat loss.
