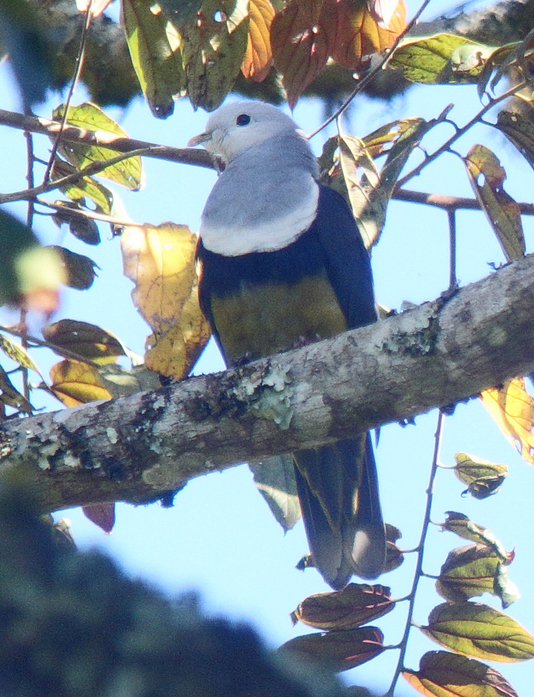

Conservation status
- Least Concern (IUCN 3.1)

Scientific classification
- Kingdom: Animalia
- Phylum: Chordata
- Class: Aves
- Order: Columbiformes
- Family: Columbidae
- Genus: Ptilinopus
- Species: P. cinctus

Binomial name
- Ptilinopus cinctus (Temminck, 1809)

Synonyms
- Columba Cincta (protonym)

= Banded fruit dove =

Species of bird

The banded fruit dove or black-backed fruit dove (Ptilinopus cinctus) is a large (38–44 cm in length, 450-570 g in weight) pigeon with white head, neck and upper breast; black back and upperwing grading to grey on rump; black tail with broad grey terminal band; underparts grey, demarcated from white head.

== Description ==
The banded fruit dove has a white head, dark gray back, a yellow underbelly, and a black breast-band above the white breast and grey belly.

== Distribution and habitat ==
The banded fruit dove is native to the Lesser Sunda Islands and ranges from Bali eastward to Timor-Leste. It inhabits monsoonal rainforests, subtropical, tropical forests, and wooded hillsides. The banded fruit-dove is most commonly found in the upper canopy of fig trees and other fruit-bearing rainforest species. The species may also occur in areas with rocky terrain that provides protection for rainforest vegetation, although it may be less abundant in areas with dense understory weeds.

=== Observation locations ===
In Australia, the species is most frequently reported around Nourlangie Rock in Kakadu National Park. Fruit doves walk along the ground and often occupy the upper tree canopies. The national park features a birding lookout: the Nawurlandja Lookout, which provides an area to search for the Banded Fruit Dove. From the lookout, banded fruit doves can sometimes be seen on the rocky ridges on the left side.

== Behaviour ==
=== Behaviour ===
Banded fruit-doves spend much of the day feeding quietly or resting in the canopies of fig trees, which can make the species difficult for researchers to observe. They are more active during the early morning and late afternoon, when birds may be seen flying near escarpments to and from feeding trees. The species' vocalization is a short, deep “woo-oo,” rising at the beginning and falling at the end.

==== Breeding ====
The banded fruit dove mates and then builds a fragile nest in rainforest trees, often laying two eggs.

== Conservation status ==
The banded fruit-dove is classified as Least Concern by the IUCN Red List. To qualify as Vulnerable, a species must occur within an area smaller than 20,000 km² and show a significant population decline. Although the global population has not been formally quantified, there may be more than 10,000 adult individuals. While the population trend appears to be decreasing, the decline is not yet rapid enough to meet the threshold for Vulnerable status, which requires a reduction of more than 30% over 10 years or three generations. Studies have also identified the species as among the more climate-sensitive terrestrial birds in Australia.

== Evolution ==
Banded fruit doves are very vulnerable to climate change; they are a part of the top 100 most sensitive terrestrial Australian birds. They are able to identify and manage food availability by eating the fruit of figs and other rainforest trees and shrubs. The rainforest where banded fruit doves are located is protected by the rocky Terrain, so the pigeons are less abundant where weeds in the understory are present.
