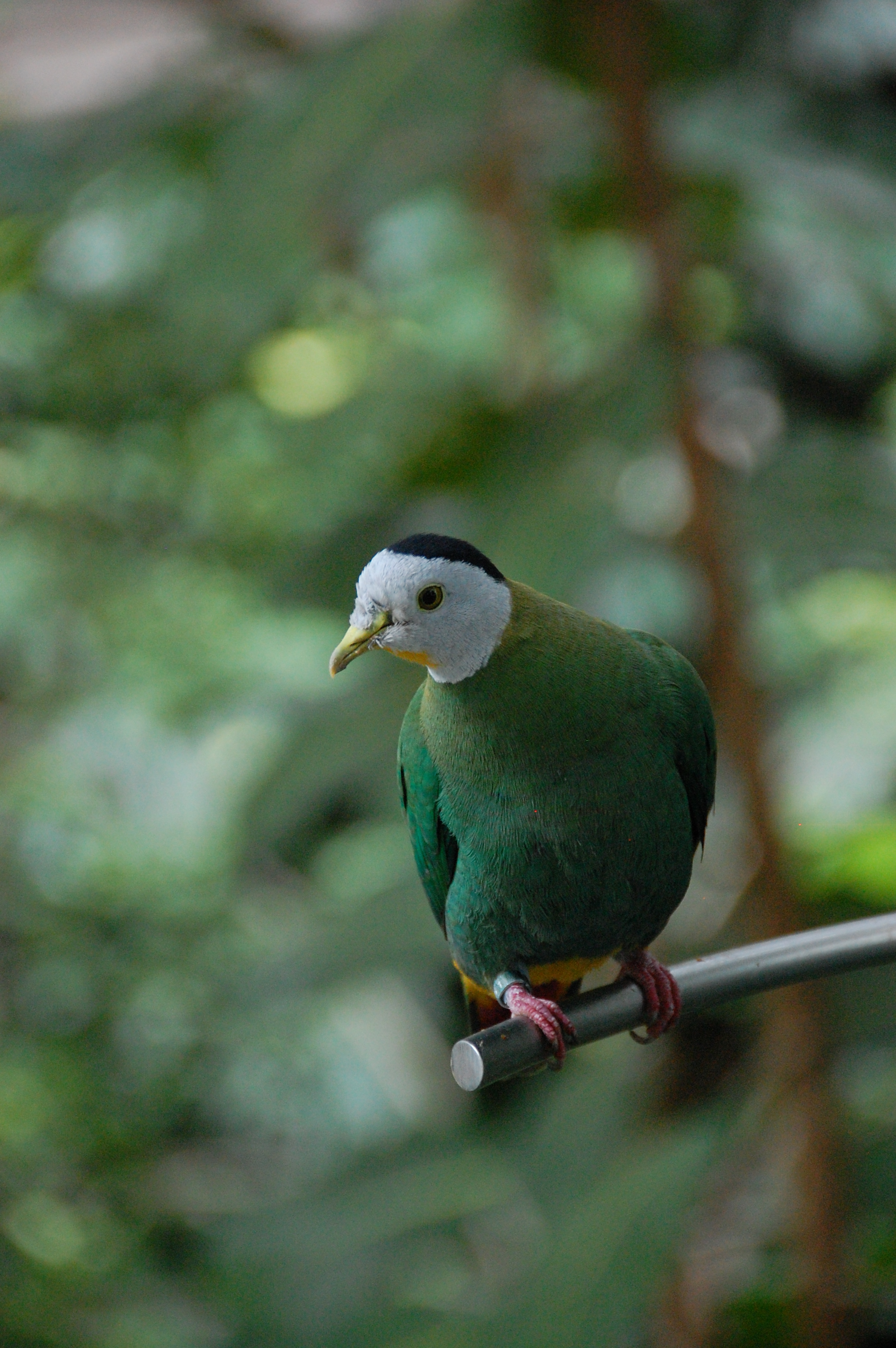
- Male
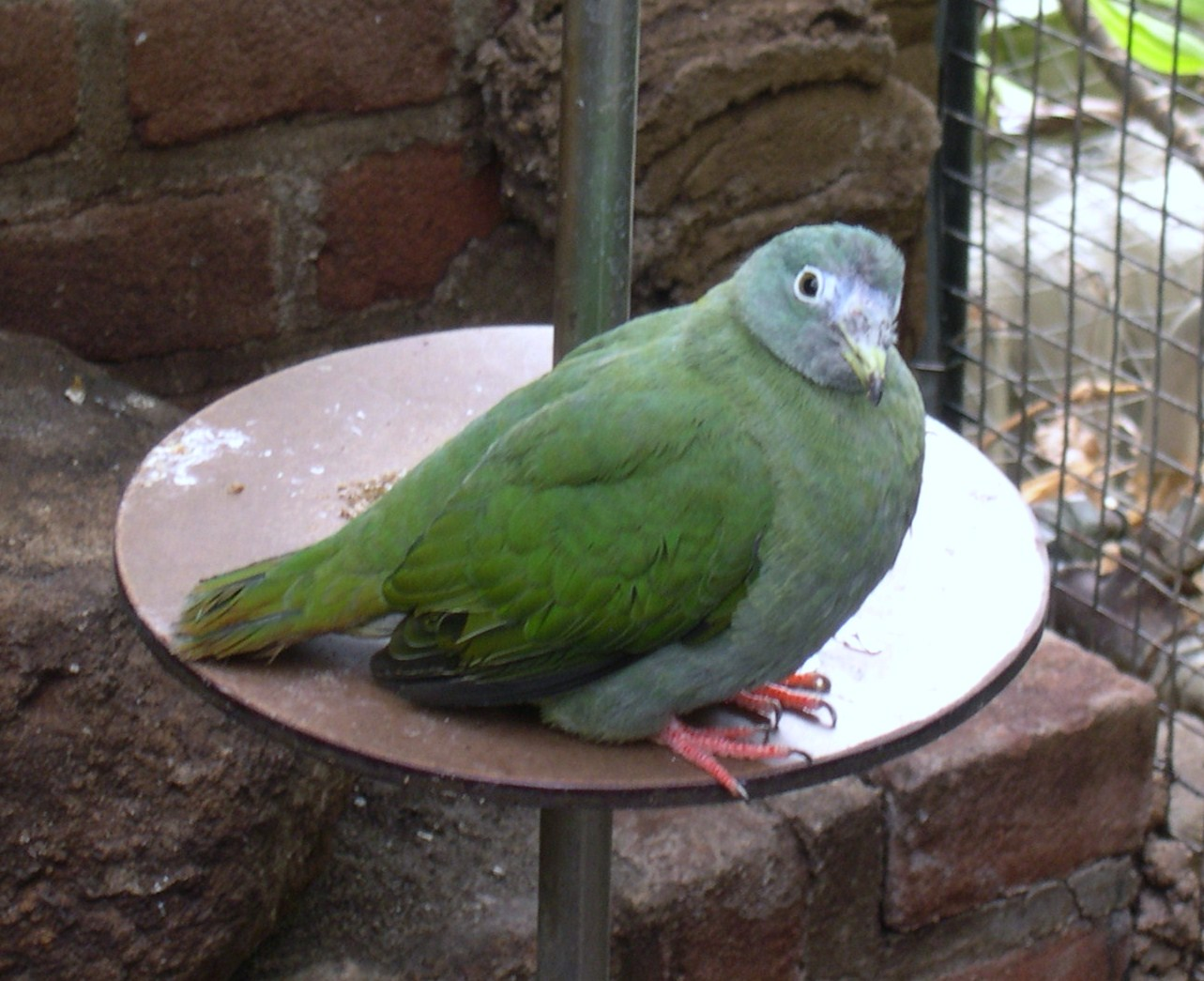
- Female

Conservation status
- Least Concern (IUCN 3.1)

Scientific classification
- Kingdom: Animalia
- Phylum: Chordata
- Class: Aves
- Order: Columbiformes
- Family: Columbidae
- Genus: Ptilinopus
- Species: P. melanospilus

Binomial name
- Ptilinopus melanospilus (Salvadori, 1875)

= Black-naped fruit dove =

Species of bird

The black-naped fruit dove (Ptilinopus melanospilus), also known as the black-headed fruit dove, is a medium-sized, up to 24 cm (9.4 in) long, green fruit dove with yellowish bill and iris. The male has a pale grey head with a black nape, yellow throat, and golden yellow and pink undertail coverts. The plumage of the female and the young is entirely green.

== Distribution and habitat ==
The black-naped fruit dove is distributed in Indonesia, Malaysia and the Philippines. In Indonesia, it is found in Java, Lesser Sunda Islands and Sulawesi, where it inhabits the lowland and hill forests. The diet consists mainly of various fruits, figs and berries. The female usually lays one single white egg.

Widespread and common throughout its large range, the black-naped fruit dove is evaluated as Least Concern on the IUCN Red List of Threatened Species.

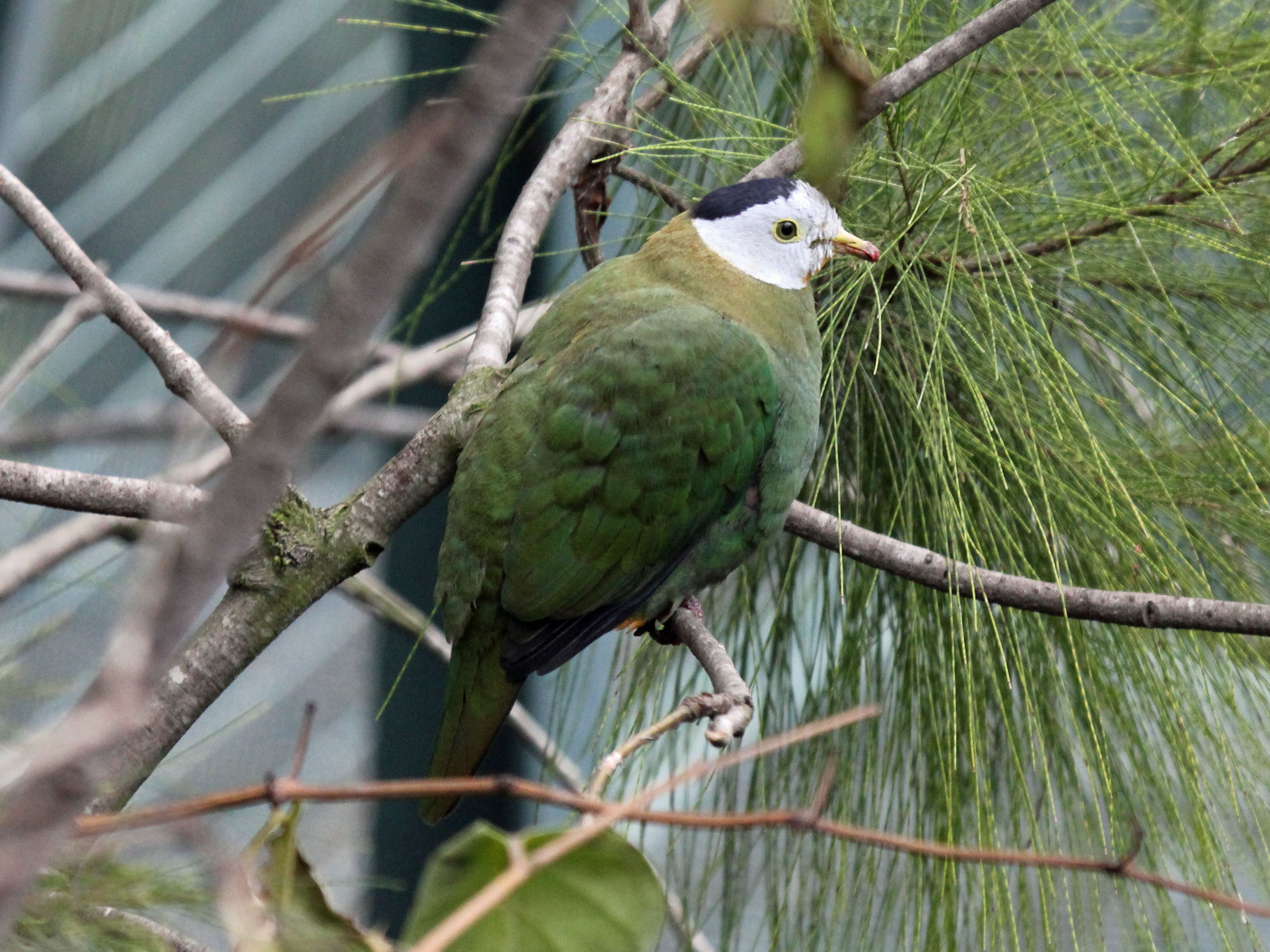
Male at San Diego Zoo
