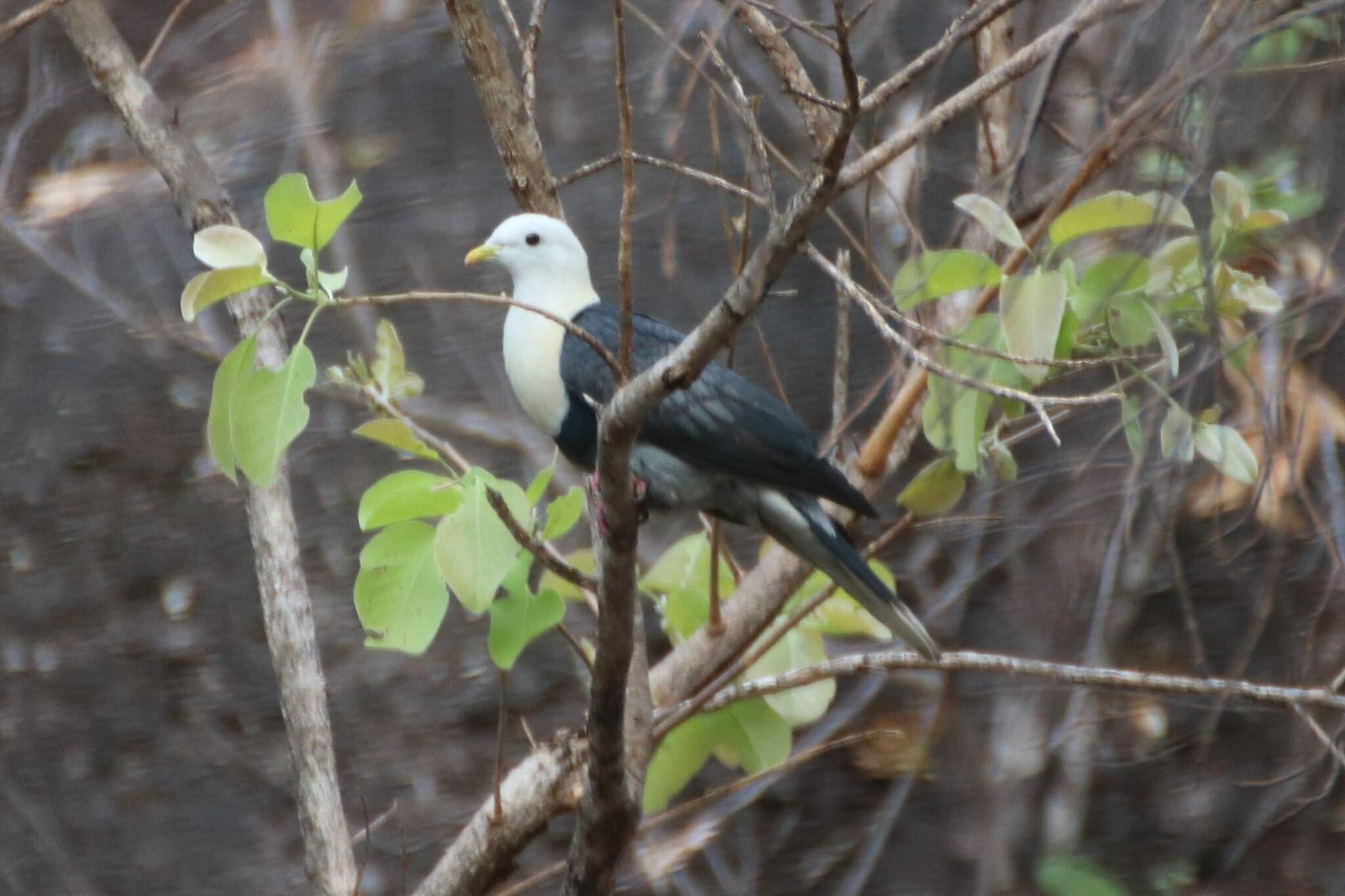

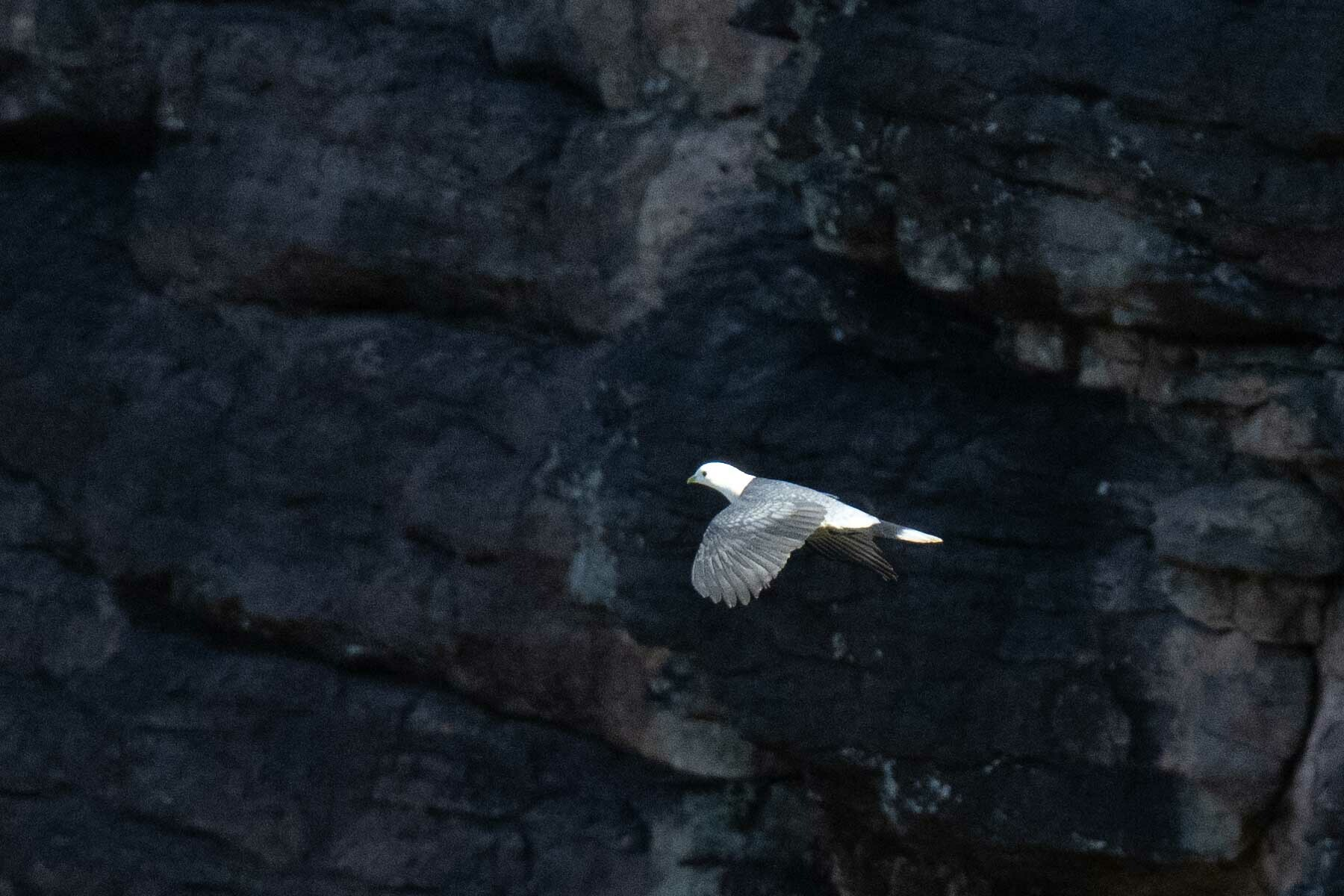

Conservation status
- Least Concern (IUCN 3.1)

Scientific classification
- Kingdom: Animalia
- Phylum: Chordata
- Class: Aves
- Order: Columbiformes
- Family: Columbidae
- Genus: Ptilinopus
- Species: P. alligator

Binomial name
- Ptilinopus alligator Collett, 1898

= Black-banded fruit dove =

Species of bird

The black-banded fruit dove (Ptilinopus alligator) is a large (38–44 cm in length, 450-570 g in weight) pigeon with white head, neck and upper breast; black back and upperwing grading to grey on rump; black tail with broad grey terminal band; underparts grey, demarcated from white head and neck by broad black band.

== Distribution ==
The species is endemic to Australia, where it is restricted to the western edge of the Arnhem Land escarpment.

== Habitat ==
Patches of monsoonal rainforest.

== Food ==
Fruit from forest trees, especially figs.

== Nesting ==
Lays single egg on open platform of sticks in a forest tree.
