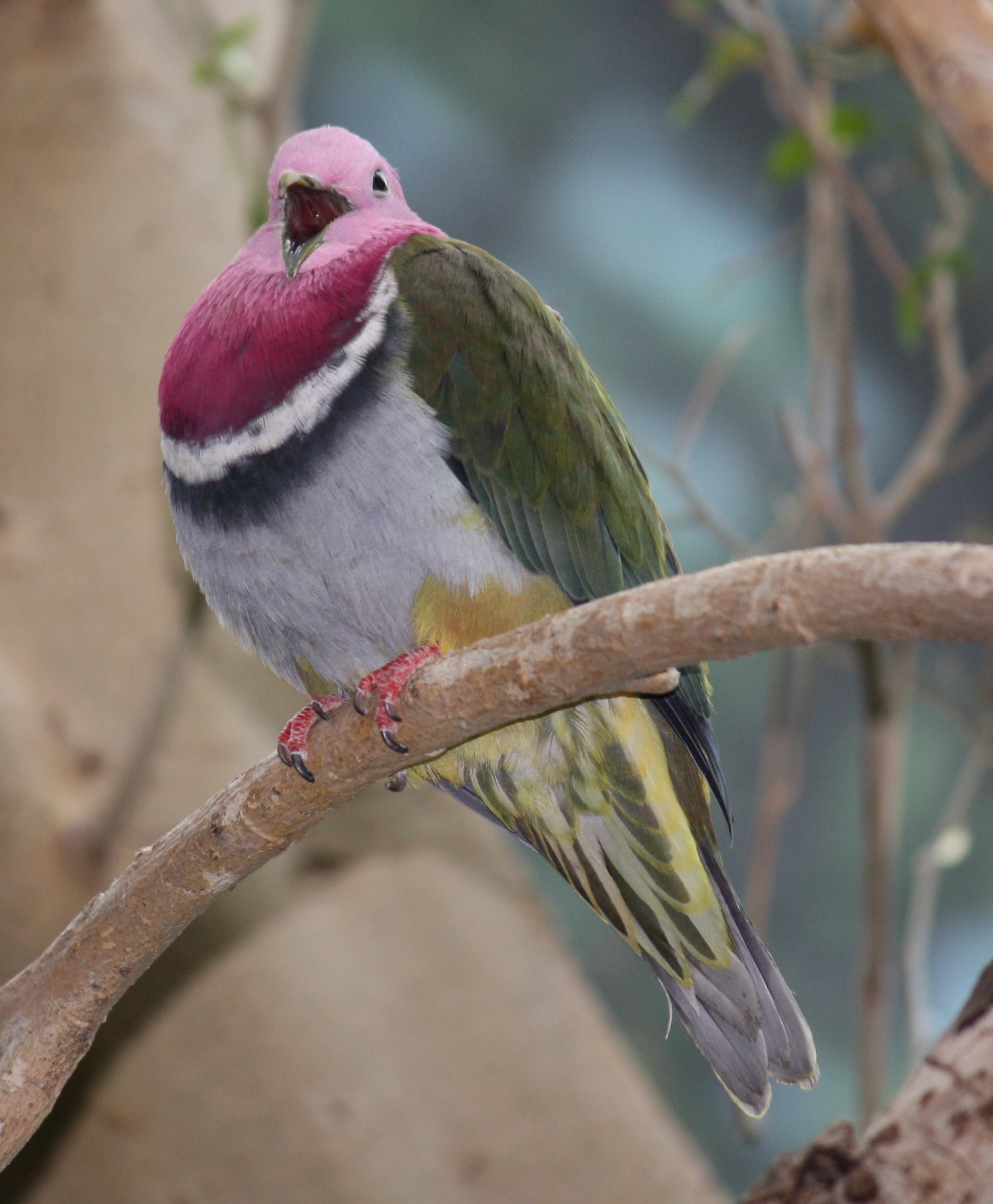
- Taken at Louisville Zoo

Conservation status
- Least Concern (IUCN 3.1)

Scientific classification
- Kingdom: Animalia
- Phylum: Chordata
- Class: Aves
- Order: Columbiformes
- Family: Columbidae
- Genus: Ptilinopus
- Species: P. porphyreus

Binomial name
- Ptilinopus porphyreus (Temminck, 1822)

= Pink-headed fruit dove =

Species of bird

The pink-headed fruit dove (Ptilinopus porphyreus) also known as pink-necked fruit dove or Temminck's fruit pigeon, is a small colourful dove.

The pink-headed fruit dove is a resident breeding endemic bird in Indonesia where it occurs in the mountain forests of Sumatra, Java and Bali at altitudes of 1000–2200 m. It builds a flimsy nest in a tree and lays one or sometimes two white eggs which are incubated for 20 days to hatching, with a further 15–16 days to fledging. It is a shy and inconspicuous species, generally seen singly or in pairs, but flocks of up to 17 birds may form at favoured fruit trees.

Male

The male has a purple-pink head, neck and throat, bordered below with a white band outlined in greenish black. The upperparts are green and the underparts grey, with yellow undertail coverts. The iris is orange, the bill is greenish, and feet are pink. The female is duller than the male, with a weaker breast band, and the juvenile is an even drabber version of the female. The call is a soft hoo. The male pink-headed fruit doves were observed to be the only ones participating in nest building, the "flimsy" nest mentioned earlier can be described as a "Pigeon-like" nest. Females were observed not participating in the nest building and instead were observed to perch in tall nearby trees.

This dove feeds on figs, small fruit and berries in the upper canopy of the forest, where it is well-camouflaged amongst the green foliage.

The pink-headed fruit dove is restricted to less than 12,000 km^{2} (4,600 sq mi) of forest in three sites on Sumatra, sixteen on Java and one on Bali, always on forested mountains at least 2,000 m (6,600 ft) high. Most sites are smaller than 200 km^{2} (77 sq mi) and shrinking. However the species is very inconspicuous and it is not yet thought to be threatened.

The pink-headed fruit dove is evaluated as Least Concern on the IUCN Red List of Threatened Species. While in the past the species was rarely found on offer in traditional bird markets in Indonesia, in 2022 it was found that dozens of pink-headed fruit doves were openly offered for sale on Indonesian Facebook pages and other social media platforms
