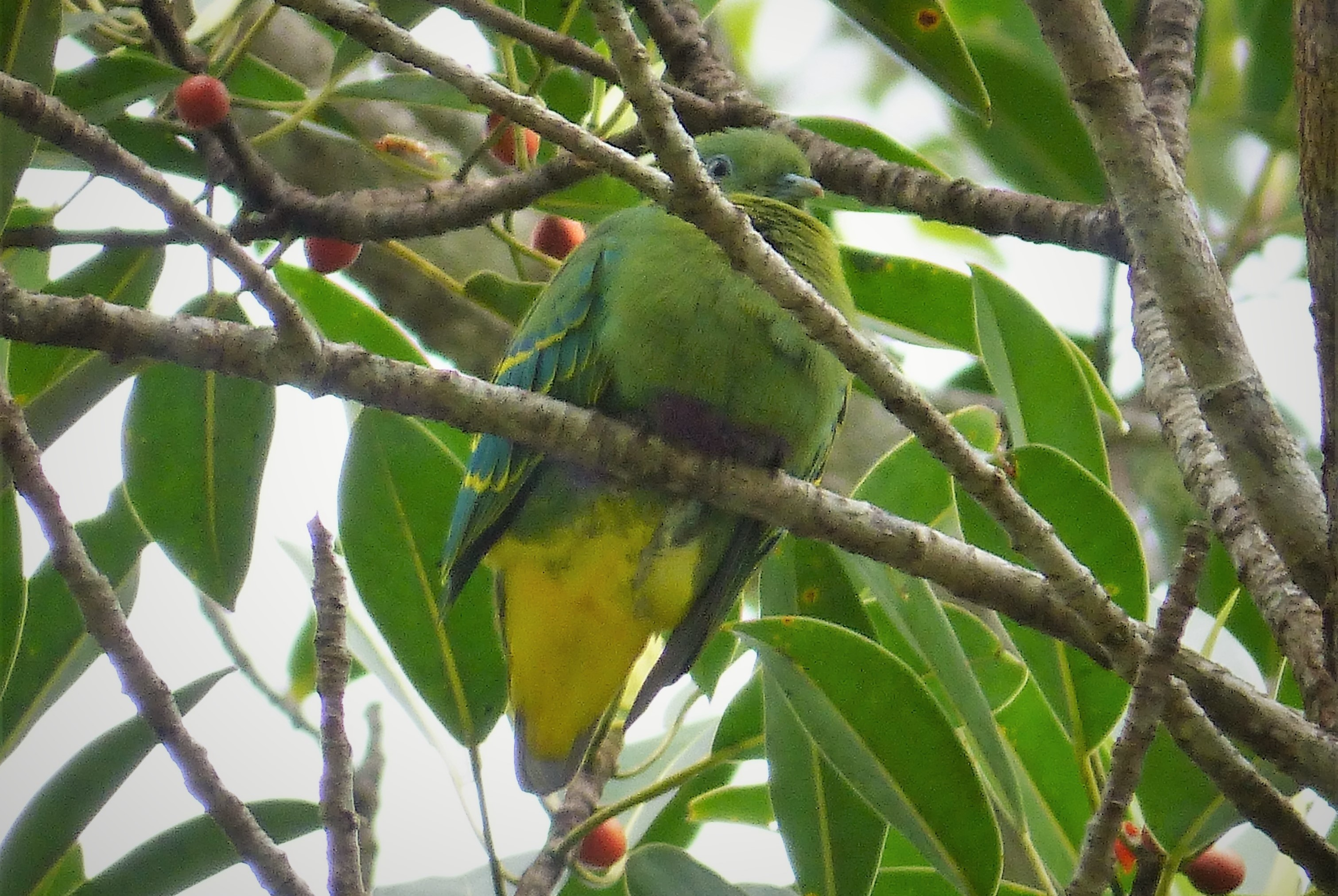

Conservation status
- Least Concern (IUCN 3.1)

Scientific classification
- Kingdom: Animalia
- Phylum: Chordata
- Class: Aves
- Order: Columbiformes
- Family: Columbidae
- Genus: Ptilinopus
- Species: P. nainus

Binomial name
- Ptilinopus nainus (Temminck, 1835)

Synonyms
- Ptilinopus naina; Ptilinopus nanus

= Dwarf fruit dove =

Species of bird

The dwarf fruit dove (Ptilinopus nainus) is a species of bird in the family Columbidae. It is found in lowland and foothill forest in New Guinea and the Raja Ampat Islands. The dwarf fruit dove weighs 49 grams, about equivalent to the weight of two AA batteries. This bird is the shortest in length within the fruit dove genus, and perhaps the shortest columbid of all.

== Description ==
With a total length of 13–15 centimetres (5.1–5.9 in), it is the shortest pigeon or dove in the world, but as it is relatively stocky, this species is more massive than several other small doves, weighing at 49 grams (1.7 oz). Its plumage is overall green, but with contrasting yellow undertail coverts, and narrow bars to the wings. The inner wing-coverts and secondaries are more bluish in color compared to the rest of the body. This bluish-green coloring is most prominent on the scapulars; the body feathers that cover the top of the wing when the bird is at rest. The males have a dark purple patch on the belly and tend to have a gray patch on both sides of their upper breasts. The females look similar but lack these patches. Both males and females have a yellowish-green beak and purplish-red legs, in addition to a yellow area on their abdomen and undertail coverts. Juvenile fruit doves resemble the adult female's coloration, but have yellow fringes on most of their feathers. Eventually this yellow fringe will disappear, and the birds will take on the adult plumage of their respective sex.

=== Vocalisations ===
Dwarf fruit doves will communicate with each other using a high-pitched, slow, soft, and prolonged upslur. With a one-second pause, the sound is repeated about six times. Their call resembles a "oh-wah" sound.

== Distribution and habitat ==
The habitat of the dwarf fruit dove are forests in the lowlands and foothills of New Guinea, excluding northwestern New Guinea and the north coast of southeastern New Guinea. Additionally, they are found in the Raja Ampat Islands off the coast of Northwestern New Guinea. They have been most found in hills of up to 1,100 metres (3,600 ft) elevation. They inhabit the Varirata National Park in New Guinea.

== Behaviour and ecology ==
These fruit doves will often be found in pairs of their own species, and sometimes intermingling with other fruit dove species.

=== Breeding ===
The dwarf fruit dove's nests have been found in September and November. Nests are found at varying heights in small trees from 3 to 12 metres (9.8 to 39.4 ft) above ground. A nest under construction was observed to be built by the female bird using twigs on top of dead leaves, which were collected by the male. The species has a generational length of 3.39 years.

=== Diet ===
90 percent of their diet comes from fruit, whereas the other 10 percent comes from nectar; thus the dwarf fruit dove can be considered both a frugivore and nectarivore. When 8 dwarf fruit doves were captured and observed, they only ate figs during their captivity.

== Status ==
The dwarf fruit dove has a stable population; it is a not globally threatened species, and is categorized under the Least Concern category of the IUCN red list, though the population trend is decreasing. The dwarf fruit dove is scarce, but not rare. The population size is unknown. The movement of the dwarf fruit dove is stationary around Port Moresby, New Guinea but migrant in Tabubil.
