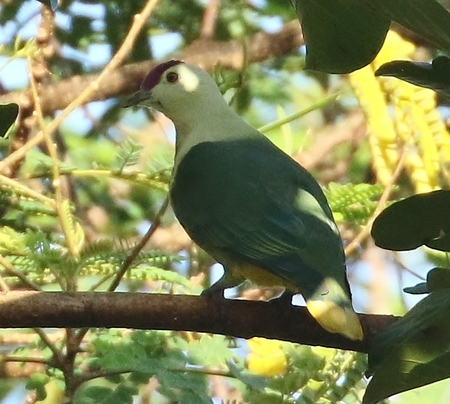

Conservation status
- Least Concern (IUCN 3.1)

Scientific classification
- Kingdom: Animalia
- Phylum: Chordata
- Class: Aves
- Order: Columbiformes
- Family: Columbidae
- Genus: Ptilinopus
- Species: P. ponapensis

Binomial name
- Ptilinopus ponapensis Finsch, 1878

= Purple-capped fruit dove =

Species of bird

The purple-capped fruit dove or Pohnpei fruit dove (Ptilinopus ponapensis), is a species of bird in the family Columbidae found on Chuuk and Pohnpei in the Caroline Islands. It was formerly considered as a subspecies of the crimson-crowned fruit dove. Its natural habitats are subtropical or tropical moist lowland forests and subtropical or tropical mangrove forests.
