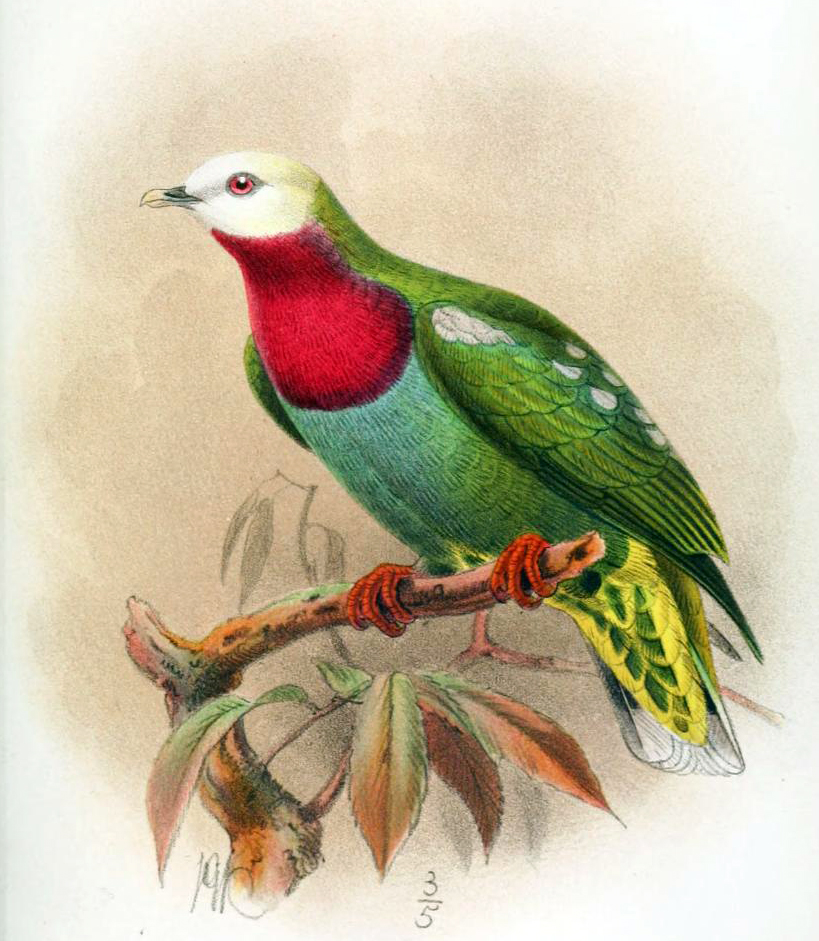
- An 1893 illustration of the species by John Gerrard Keulemans
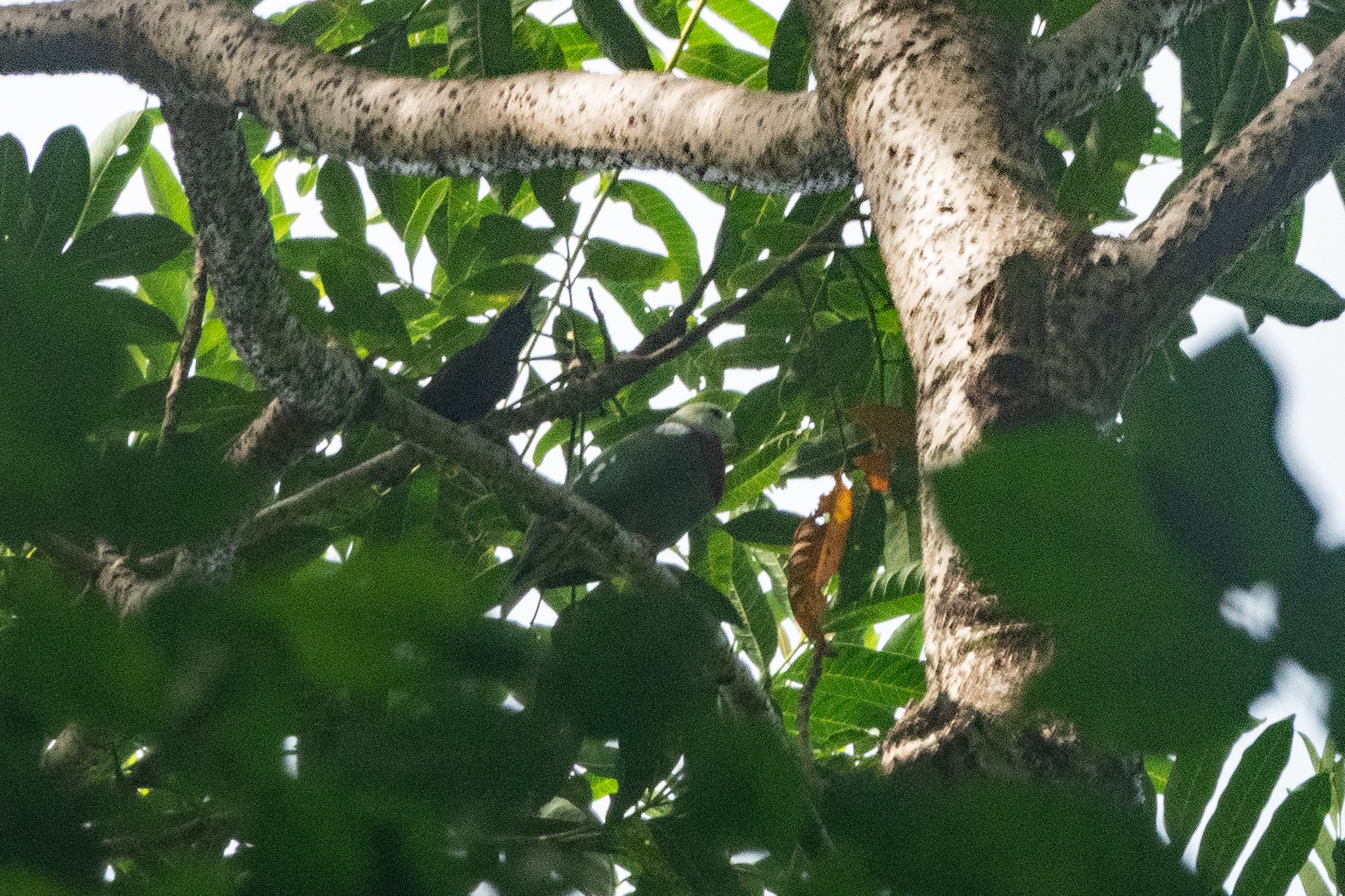

Conservation status
- Least Concern (IUCN 3.1)

Scientific classification
- Kingdom: Animalia
- Phylum: Chordata
- Class: Aves
- Order: Columbiformes
- Family: Columbidae
- Genus: Ptilinopus
- Species: P. eugeniae

Binomial name
- Ptilinopus eugeniae (Gould, 1856)
- Range of the white-headed fruit dove within Solomon Islands

Synonyms
- Iotreron eugeniae Gould, 1856

= White-headed fruit dove =

Species of bird endemic to Solomon Islands

The white-headed fruit dove (Ptilinopus eugeniae) is a species of bird in the pigeon family, Columbidae. It was described by the English ornithologist John Gould in 1856, and the specific name eugeniae honours the French empress Eugénie de Montijo. Adults of the species have white heads, a purplish-red breast patch, a grey shoulder patch, olive-green upperparts, greenish underparts with a blue tinge, and a yellowish vent. Juveniles have green heads with the white restricted to the forehead and upper throat, a much smaller grey shoulder patch, and the red breast patch restricted to the centre of the breast.

The species is endemic to Makira and the nearby islands of Ugi and Malaupaina in Solomon Islands. It inhabits lowland, hill, and ridge forest, along with neighbouring agricultural areas, and is especially common in foothills. Its diet consists of small-seeded fruits and berries. The International Union for Conservation of Nature considers it least concern. Although it can adapt to disturbed habitat, it is threatened by deforestation and habitat loss.

== Taxonomy and systematics ==
The white-headed fruit dove was originally described as Iotreron eugeniae by the English ornithologist John Gould in 1856 based on specimens from the Solomon Islands archipelago. It was then moved to the fruit dove genus Ptilinopus by the English zoologist George Robert Gray in the same year. The name of the genus comes from the Ancient Greek ptilon 'feather' and pous 'foot', while the specific name eugeniae is in honour of Eugénie de Montijo, wife of Napoleon III. "White-headed fruit dove" is the official common name designated by the International Ornithologists' Union (IOU). Another name for the species is "Eugenie's fruit dove".

The white-headed fruit dove is one of over 50 species of pigeon in the fruit dove genus Ptilinopus, which is found throughout Southeast Asia and Oceania. Within the genus, it is most closely related to the claret-breasted fruit dove (Ptilinopus viridis), with which its taxonomy is unclear. Some authors have treated the two as being conspecific (of the same species), while others treat them as different species but treat P. v. vicinus and P. v. lewisii (two subspecies that are currently treated as part of the claret-breasted fruit dove) as subspecies of the white-headed fruit dove. The IOU currently treats the white-headed fruit dove as having no subspecies.

A 2014 study of mitochondrial and nuclear DNA by Alice Cibois and colleagues found that the white-headed fruit dove was nested inside a population of the lewisii subspecies, which may either support transferring the subspecies vicinus and lewisii to the white-headed fruit dove, or may have been caused by incomplete lineage sorting (retention of ancestral variation in genes). The same study also found that the white-headed and claret-breasted fruit doves were together sister (most closely related) to the orange-bellied fruit dove, and that these species are together sister to a clade (group of all the descendants of a common ancestor) formed by the grey-headed, pink-spotted, Wallace's, orange-fronted, and ornate fruit doves. The most basal species in the group is the Tanna fruit dove. The following cladogram shows the relationships of the white-headed fruit dove with other species in its group based on the 2014 study:

- tannensis group
  - Tanna fruit dove (P. tannensis)
  - - - Orange-bellied fruit dove (P. iozonus)
      - - White-headed fruit dove (P. eugeniae)
        - Claret-breasted fruit dove (P. viridis)
    - - Grey-headed fruit dove (P. hyogastrus)
      - - Pink-spotted fruit dove (P. perlatus)
        - - Wallace's fruit dove (P. wallacii)
          - - Orange-fronted fruit dove (P. aurantiifrons)
            - Ornate fruit dove (P. ornatus)

== Description ==
The white-headed fruit dove is a small, plump, and short-tailed species of fruit dove, with a length of 18–22 cm (7.1–8.7 in). The entire head and upper throat are snowy white, while the back of the neck is white with a pale yellow tinge. The rest of the upperparts are mainly olive green, with the neck, mantle and scapulars having a coppery lustre and the wing being darker green with a bluish gloss. The marginal coverts are pale grey and form a well-defined shoulder patch and there are also small grey spots on the covert feathers and tertiary feathers. The breast is rich purplish-red with a dark purple border. The underparts are duller green, with a bluish or greyish tinge, while the vent is pale yellow to white. The bill is dull maroon at the base and turns yellowish at the tip, while the legs are purplish-red with a bluish tinge. The iris is orange-red, with the skin around the eye being blue-grey to dark green. Both sexes look similar. Juveniles have green heads with white restricted to the forehead and upper throat, a much smaller grey shoulder patch, and the red breast patch restricted to the centre of the breast. They also have smaller grey spots on the tertials and greener underparts lacking a bluish tinge.

The yellow-bibbed fruit dove may be confused with the white-headed fruit dove, but males of the former species can be easily told apart by their bright yellow breastband. Females and juveniles are more similar, but lack the grey shoulder patch and have brighter yellow vents. It differs from the claret-breasted fruit dove in its white head and upper throat, dark purple border to the breast patch, and duller green underparts. The white-headed fruit dove can also be told apart from other species of pigeons that occur in its range by its snowy-white head and red breast patch.

The advertising call of the species is a soft two-note hu..whoOo given at intervals of 3–6 seconds. The first note is short and weak, while the second note is longer (around 0.5 seconds long) and more emphasised. The phrase is occasionally repeated a few times.

== Behaviour and ecology ==
The white-headed fruit dove is endemic to Solomon Islands, where it is found on the islands of Makira, Ugi, and Malaupaina. It inhabits lowland, hill, and ridge forest, along with neighbouring agricultural areas, up to elevations of 700 m (2,300 ft). It is especially numerous in foothills and may prefer hill forest. It also shows the ability to adapt to disturbed habitat, with a 2015 survey of Makira showing that it appeared to prefer human-modified areas like secondary forest, gardens, and cocoa plantations.

The white-headed fruit dove is usually seen in ones or pairs, though small groups may form at large fruiting trees, where it forms mixed-species foraging flocks with the silver-capped fruit dove and chestnut-bellied imperial pigeon. The species' flight is fast and straight and it will often fly over open areas where it is more visible than in forest. The species is frugivorous, feeding on small-seeded fruit and berries. It sometimes feeds on solitary trees away from forest. Little is known about the white-headed fruit dove's breeding habits, but a juvenile was recorded during September.

== Conservation ==
It is considered least concern by the International Union for Conservation of Nature (IUCN) on the IUCN Red List.
