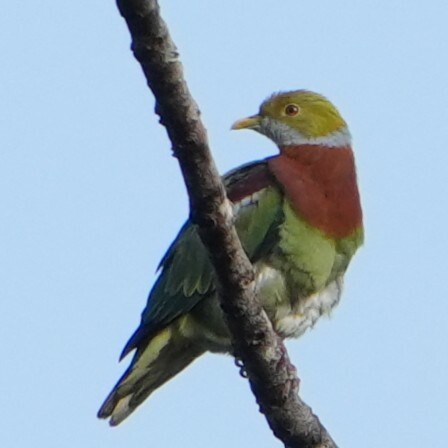
- At Cincinnati Zoo and Botanical Garden

Conservation status
- Least Concern (IUCN 3.1)

Scientific classification
- Kingdom: Animalia
- Phylum: Chordata
- Class: Aves
- Order: Columbiformes
- Family: Columbidae
- Genus: Ptilinopus
- Species: P. ornatus

Binomial name
- Ptilinopus ornatus Schlegel, 1871

= Ornate fruit dove =

Species of bird

The ornate fruit dove (Ptilinopus ornatus) is a species of bird in the family Columbidae. It is found in New Guinea. Its natural habitats are subtropical or tropical moist lowland forest and subtropical or tropical moist montane forest.

== Taxonomy and systematics ==
The ornate fruit dove was originally described as Ptilopus ornatus (an incorrect spelling of Ptilinopus) by Hermann Schlegel in 1871 on the basis of specimens from New Guinea. The species' generic name comes from the Ancient Greek ptilon (feather) and pous (foot), while the specific name ornatus is from the Latin word ornatus, meaning ornate or decorated. Ornate fruit dove is the official common name designated by the International Ornithologists' Union (IOU).

The ornate fruit dove is one of over 50 species of pigeon in the fruit dove genus Ptilinopus, which is found throughout Southeast Asia and Oceania. A 2014 study of mitochondrial and nuclear DNA by Alice Cibois and colleagues found that the ornate fruit dove was most closely related to the orange-fronted fruit dove. The same study also found that these two species were further sister (the closest relative of) to Wallace's fruit dove. These three species are sister to the pink-spotted fruit dove and these four species are sister to the grey-headed fruit dove. This group of five species is sister to a clade formed by the orange-bellied, white-headed, and claret-breasted fruit doves. The Tanna fruit dove is sister to all other species in the group. The following cladogram shows the relationships of the ornate fruit dove with other species in its group based on the 2014 study:

- tannensis group
  - Tanna fruit dove (P. tannensis)
  - - - Orange-bellied fruit dove (P. iozonus)
      - - White-headed fruit dove (P. eugeniae)
        - Claret-breasted fruit dove (P. viridis)
    - - Grey-headed fruit dove (P. hyogastrus)
      - - Pink-spotted fruit dove (P. perlatus)
        - - Wallace's fruit dove (P. wallacii)
          - - Orange-fronted fruit dove (P. aurantiifrons)
            - Ornate fruit dove (P. ornatus)

=== Subspecies ===
The IOU currently recognises two subspecies of the ornate fruit dove. These two species are sometimes recognised as separate species by other authorities.

- P. o. ornatus Schlegel, 1871: The nominate subspecies, it is found in the Bird's Head Peninsula in northwestern New Guinea.
- P. o. gestroi D'Albertis & Salvadori, 1875: Also known as the Eastern ornate fruit dove or Gestroi's fruit dove, it was originally described as a separate species by Luigi D'Albertis and Tommaso Salvadori. It is found from the Fakfak and Kumawa Mountains on the Onin Peninsula east to Milne Bay, including the Cyclops Mountains. It has a mustard-yellow crown, compared to the nominate subspecies's wine-red crown. Populations from the Onin Peninsula to the Chimbu Province are sometimes treated at a distinct subspecies kaporensis, but differences between P. o. gestroi and P. o. kaporensis are mostly clinal and do not warrant different subspecies.
