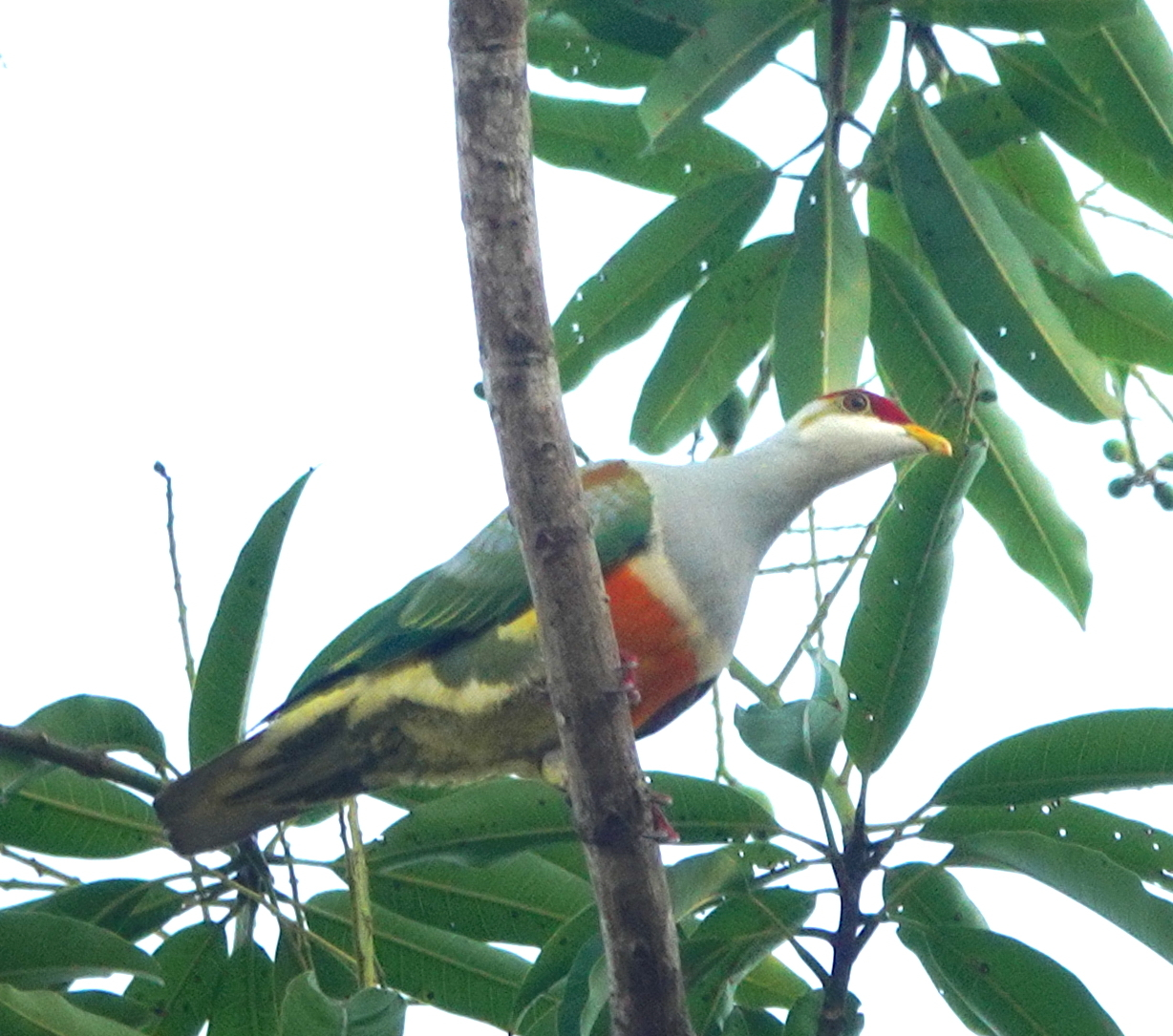

Conservation status
- Least Concern (IUCN 3.1)

Scientific classification
- Kingdom: Animalia
- Phylum: Chordata
- Class: Aves
- Order: Columbiformes
- Family: Columbidae
- Genus: Ptilinopus
- Species: P. wallacii

Binomial name
- Ptilinopus wallacii Gray, 1858

= Wallace's fruit dove =

Species of pigeon endemic to Indonesia

Wallace's fruit dove (Ptilinopus wallacii) is a species of a bird in the pigeon family Columbidae. The name commemorates the British naturalist Alfred Russel Wallace. It is a rather large, long-tailed fruit dove with a length of 24–28 cm (9.4–11.0 in) and has been described as "one of the most beautiful" fruit doves. The forehead and crown are dull crimson, the lower face and throat are white, and the rest of the head, breast, neck, and upper back are pale bluish-grey. The wings and lower back are green and the belly is orange, separated from the chest by a white band. Both sexes look similar, but females have less extensive red on the head and a greenish tinge to their grey parts.

Endemic to Indonesia, Wallace's fruit dove is found in lowland riverine and coastal forests in the Lesser Sunda Islands, the Moluccas, the Aru Islands, and occasionally in southwestern New Guinea. Its diet consists of small fruits and berries. Nests are made out of twigs in branches and the only observed nest was made in November. Common to moderately common throughout most of its range, the Wallace's fruit dove is evaluated as being of least concern on the IUCN Red List.

== Taxonomy and systematics ==
Wallace's fruit dove was described as Ptilonopus Wallacii by the English ornithologist George Robert Gray in 1858 on the basis of specimens from the Aru Islands acquired by the British naturalist Alfred Russel Wallace. The species' generic name comes from the Ancient Greek ptilon (feather) and pous (foot), while the specific name wallacii is in honour of Alfred Wallace. Wallace's fruit dove is the official common name designated by the International Ornithologists' Union. Other common names for the species include Wallace's fruit pigeon, Wallace's green fruit dove, golden-fronted fruit dove, yellow-fronted fruit dove, golden-shouldered fruit dove, and crimson-capped fruit dove. It has no subspecies.

Wallace's fruit dove is one of over 50 species in the fruit dove genus Ptilinopus. A 2014 study of mitochondrial and nuclear DNA by Alice Cibois and colleagues found that Wallace's fruit dove was most closely related to a clade formed by the orange-fronted and ornate fruit doves. This group is sister to the pink-spotted fruit dove and these four species are in turn sister to the grey-headed fruit dove. These five species are sister to a clade formed by the orange-bellied, white-headed, and claret-breasted fruit doves. The Tanna fruit dove is sister to all other species in the group. The following cladogram shows the relationships of the white-headed fruit dove with other species in its group based on the 2014 study:

- tannensis group
  - Tanna fruit dove (P. tannensis)
  - - - Orange-bellied fruit dove (P. iozonus)
      - - White-headed fruit dove (P. eugeniae)
        - Claret-breasted fruit dove (P. viridis)
    - - Grey-headed fruit dove (P. hyogastrus)
      - - Pink-spotted fruit dove (P. perlatus)
        - - Wallace's fruit dove (P. wallacii)
          - - Orange-fronted fruit dove (P. aurantiifrons)
            - Ornate fruit dove (P. ornatus)

== Description ==
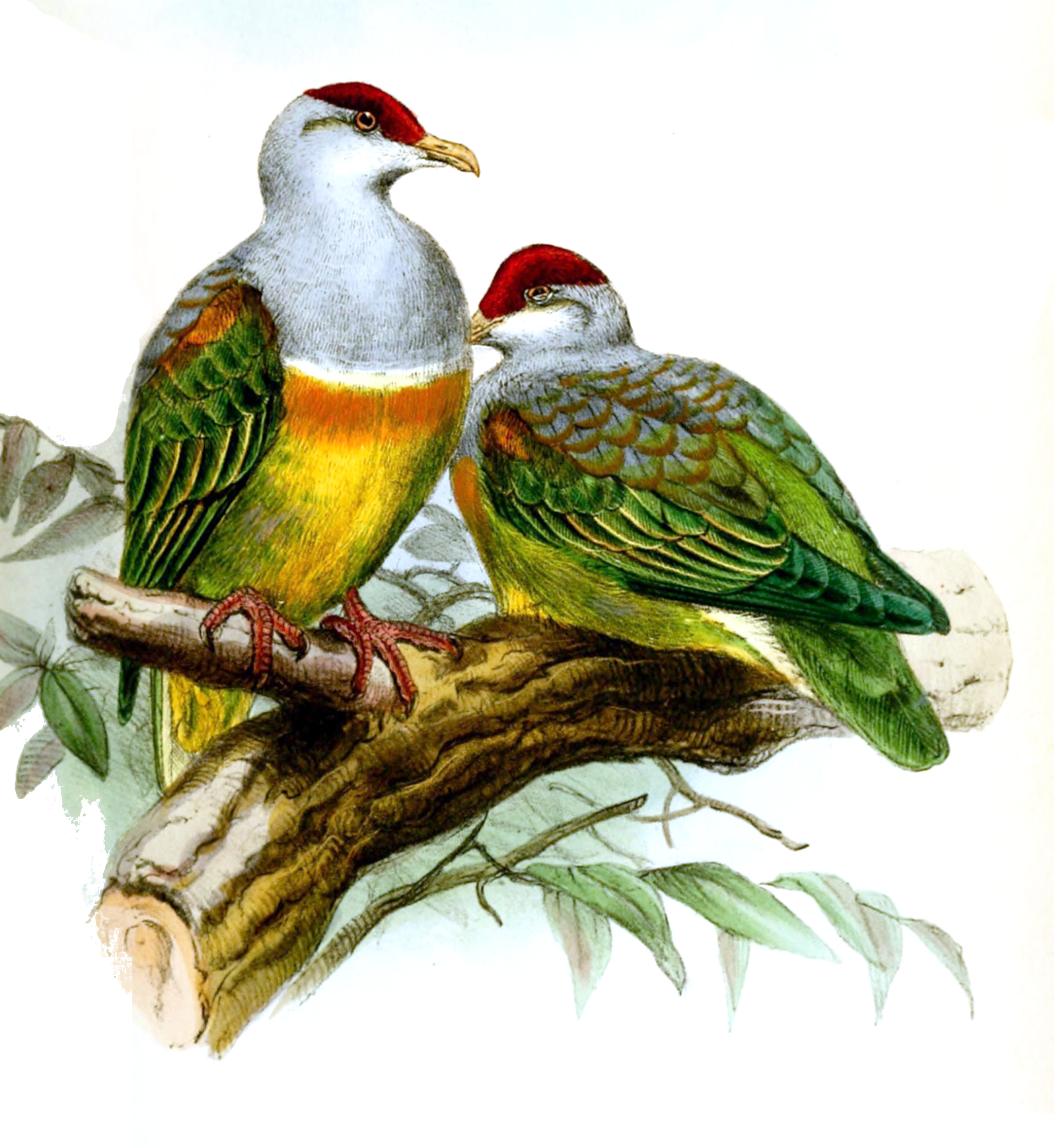
1858 illustration of the species

Wallace's fruit dove is a large, long-tailed fruit dove with a length of 24–28 cm (9.4–11.0 in). It has been described as "one of the most beautiful" fruit doves. The forehead and crown are dull crimson, sometimes extending to the back of the neck, and the lower face and throat are white. The rest of the head, neck, breast, and upper mantle are pale bluish-grey, separated from the orange belly patch by a white band. The shoulder patch is golden-bronze, while the mantle and inner wing coverts are bluish-grey with yellow edges that give a scaled appearance. The primaries and secondaries are dark shiny green, the latter having narrow yellow edges, while the back, rump, and uppertail coverts are yellowish-green. The flanks and vent are mixed pale yellow and green. The central tail feathers green with a whitish band at the end, while the outer ones are darker with a greyish band. The iris is light red with a yellow to green inner ring, the orbital skin is bluish, and the feet are purplish to pinkish. The bill is yellow-greenish yellow with a paler tip. Females are similar to males, but have a greenish tinge to the grey on the neck and breast and a less intense orange belly patch. Juveniles have green edging on the crown, yellow-tipped green feathers on the mantle and wing coverts, and a green wash on the breast and mantle.

The beautiful fruit dove (P. pulchellus) looks similar, but is smaller, more compact, and has a shorter tail, with a purple instead of white band, less extensive red on the head, and orange-yellow undertail coverts. The upperparts are unmarked deep green. The rose-crowned fruit dove (P. regina) is also similar, but is smaller and more compact with a less extensive pink or pale greyish-purple crown patch bordered with yellow, a pale purple patch separating the breast and belly, rusty-orange undertail coverts, and a well-marked yellow band on the tail.

The species is usually silent, but has been recorded giving a loud, melancholy oooo... ooo ooo ooo, with the longest pause between the first and second note. A short woo is also made in excitement. A pigeon on Tanimbar presumed to be from this species was recorded making a repeated hooooow-huwuu, hoooow-huwuu, with the second note slightly shorter and higher-pitched.

== Distribution and habitat ==
Wallace's fruit dove is found on the Babar Islands and Tanimbar Islands in the Moluccas, on the Banda Islands, Kur, Manggur, Taam, Komeer, Bacar, Tual, and Kai Kecil in the Lesser Sundas, and the Aru Islands. On New Guinea, individuals have infrequently been recorded in the southwest from the Mimika River to the Noord River, but these are thought to have been vagrants from the Aru Islands.

The species inhabits lowland forests near rivers and the coast, including mangroves, forest edges, savanna, gallery forests, and monsoon forests. It has also been recorded on islands where nearly all old-growth forest has been replaced with cultivation and appears to be able to adapt to secondary growth. On Kai Besar, it has been recorded from sea level up to elevations of 250 m (820 ft).

== Behaviour and ecology ==
Wallace's fruit dove is frequently seen alone or in pairs, although it is a social fruit dove and forms flocks of 5–26 birds. On Tanimbar, it is easily noticeable, often flying over roads and clearings or perching in open trees. Its generation length (average age of parents in the current population) was reported as being 3.2 years in 2016.

The species feeds on small fruit and berries, plucking these directly from branches. It makes a flimsy nest out of twigs in tree branches. One observed nest was made in November.

== Status ==
Wallace's fruit dove is listed as being of least concern by the International Union for Conservation of Nature (IUCN) on the IUCN Red List due to its sufficiently large range and lack of significant population decline. It is fairly common on Tanimbar and the Aru Islands and moderately common on the Kai Islands. It was not seen on the Banda Islands and Taam, where it was formerly common, in 1971. Its survival on highly populated islands indicates an ability to adjust to disturbed habitats.
