= D'Albertis (disambiguation) =

D'Albertis is an italian surname.

De Albertis may also refer to:

- D'Albertis Castle, historical residence in Genoa, north-western Italy.
- D'Albertis' ringtail possum, species of marsupial in the family Pseudocheiridae
- D'Albertis python, a species of python

== See also ==
- Albertis
