= De Albertis =

De Albertis is an Italian surname. Notable people with the surname include:

- Gasparo De Albertis (c. 1485 – c. 1560), Italian composer
- Sebastiano De Albertis (1828 – 1897), Italian painter

== See also ==
- Albertis (disambiguation)
- D'Albertis
- Alberti
