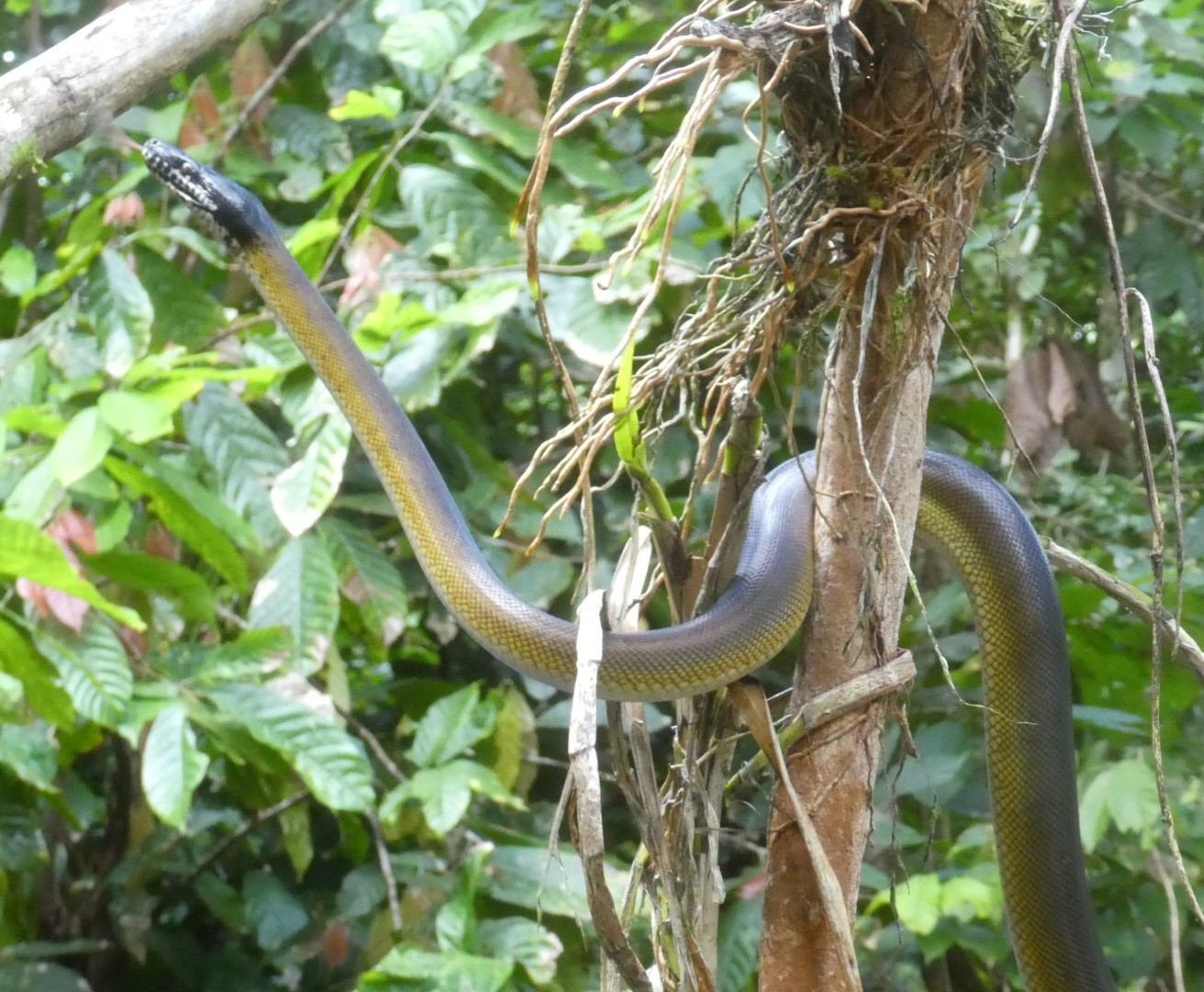

Conservation status
- Vulnerable (IUCN 3.1)

Scientific classification
- Kingdom: Animalia
- Phylum: Chordata
- Class: Reptilia
- Order: Squamata
- Suborder: Serpentes
- Family: Pythonidae
- Genus: Leiopython
- Species: L. biakensis

Binomial name
- Leiopython biakensis Schleip, 2008

Synonyms
- Bothrochilus biakensis Schleip, 2008

= Leiopython biakensis =

Species of snake

Leiopython biakensis, the Biak white-lipped python, is a species of snake in the family Pythonidae. It is endemic to the island of Biak, which lies north of New Guinea.

The species is known from a few individuals collected on the southern part of the island. Little is known about its population or habitat.

== Taxonomy ==
Some authorities consider it a population of the Northern white-lipped python (Leiopython albertisii).
