= Alberti =

Alberti may refer to:

Leon Battista Alberti, the Renaissance architect

== Places ==
- Alberti Partido, a partido of Buenos Aires Province, Argentina
- Alberti, Buenos Aires, the main town of the partido
- Alberti (Buenos Aires Underground), a railway station

== Other uses ==
- Alberti (surname)
- Alberti bass, a musical accompaniment figuration, usually in the left hand on a keyboard instrument
- Alberti cipher, an early polyalphabetic cipher (late 15th century)
- Alberti (family), Florentine political family

== See also ==
- Albertis (disambiguation)
- Albertoni, a surname
- D'Albertis (disambiguation)
