= D'Albertis =

D'Albertis is an Italian surname. Notable people with the surname include:

- Carlo Alberto D'Albertis (1906–1983), Italian Olympic sailor
- Enrico Alberto d'Albertis (1846–1932), Italian navigator, writer, philologist, ethnologist and philanthropist
- Luigi D'Albertis (1841–1901), flamboyant Italian naturalist and explorer

== See also ==
- Albertis (disambiguation)
- De Albertis (disambiguation)
