= Albertoni =

Albertoni is a surname. Notable people with this surname include:

- Gaspare Paluzzi degli Albertoni (1566–1614), Roman Catholic Bishop of Sant'Angelo dei Lombardi e Bisaccia
- Gianne Albertoni (born 1981), Brazilian actress and model
- Ludovica Albertoni, Blessed (1473–1533), Roman Catholic professed member of the Third Order of Saint Francis
- Marco Albertoni (born 1995), Italian football player
- Paluzzo Paluzzi Altieri degli Albertoni (1623–1698), Italian Catholic Cardinal and Cardinal-Nephew to Pope Clement X
- Paolo Albertoni, Italian painter of the late-Baroque period
- Pietro Albertoni (1849–1933), Italian physiologist and politician

== See also ==
- Alberti (disambiguation)
- Palazzo Albertoni Spinola, in the 10th District (Rione Campitelli), Rome, Italy
