= Carlia bicarinata =

Conservation status
- Least Concern (IUCN 3.1)

Scientific classification
- Kingdom: Animalia
- Phylum: Chordata
- Class: Reptilia
- Order: Squamata
- Suborder: Scinciformata
- Infraorder: Scincomorpha
- Family: Eugongylidae
- Genus: Carlia
- Species: C. bicarinata

Binomial name
- Carlia bicarinata Macleay, 1877
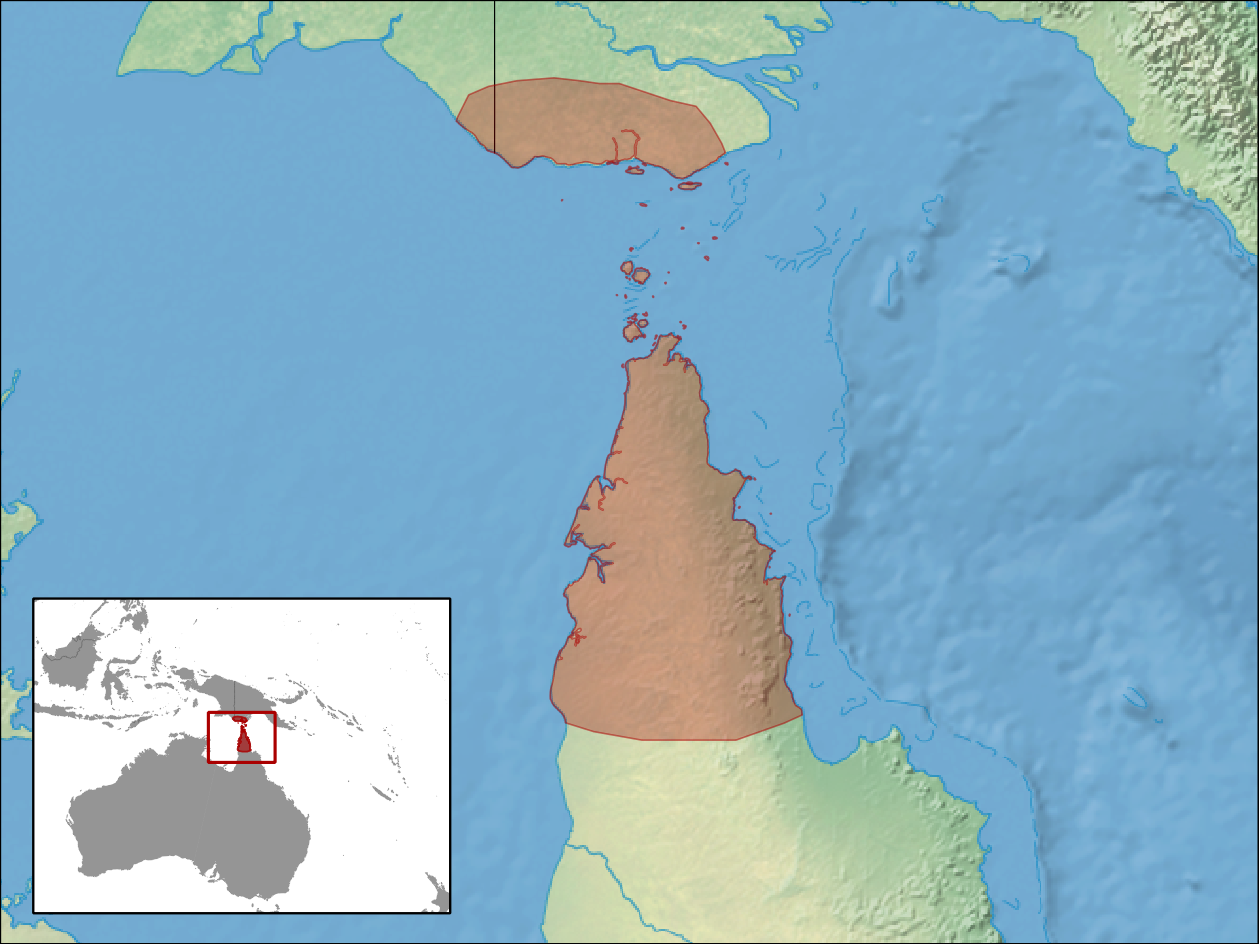

Species of skink

Carlia bicarinata is a species of skink, commonly known as the rainbow-skink, in the genus Carlia. It is endemic to Papua New Guinea.
