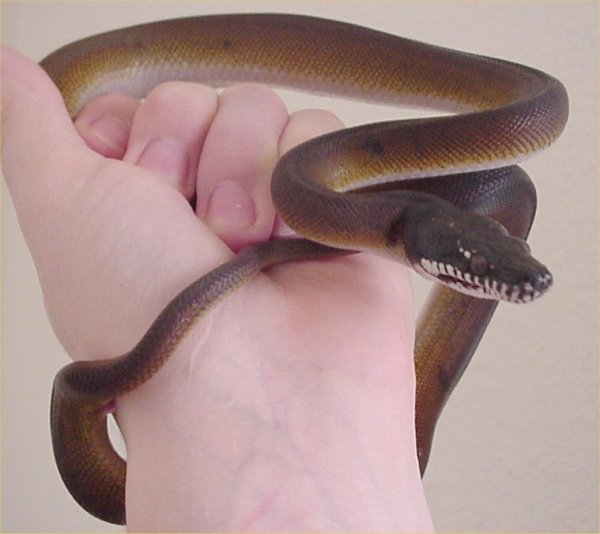

Scientific classification
- Kingdom: Animalia
- Phylum: Chordata
- Class: Reptilia
- Order: Squamata
- Suborder: Serpentes
- Family: Pythonidae
- Subfamily: Pythoninae
- Genus: Leiopython; Hubrecht, 1879

= Leiopython =

Genus of snakes

Leiopython is a genus of snakes in the family Pythonidae.

== Species ==
The number of species recognised varies. The Reptile Database recognises two species, while the IUCN and others recognise six.

- Leiopython albertisii (W. Peters & Doria, 1878) – D'Albertis python|D'Albertis' python, northern white-lipped python
- Leiopython fredparkeri Schleip, 2014 – Karimui Basin white-lipped python, southern white-lipped python
- Leiopython biakensis Schleip, 2008 – Biak white-lipped python
- Leiopython huonensis Schleip, 2008 Schleip, 2008 – Huon Peninsula white-lipped python
- Leiopython meridionalis Schleip, 2014 – southern white-lipped python, black white-lipped python
- Leiopython montanus Schleip, 2014 – Wau White-lipped Python

The Reptile Database treats Leiopython biakensis and Leiopython huonensis as populations of Leiopython albertisii, and Leiopython meridionalis and Leiopython montanus as populations of Leiopython fredparkeri., following a molecular, biogeograpic and morphological analysis in 2020 that failed to find support for other species or subspecies.

Nota bene: A binomial authority in parentheses indicates that the species was originally described in a genus other than Leiopython.

== Description ==
Female adults of the northern white-lipped python (L. albertisii) grow to an average of about 213 cm (6–7 ft) in total length (including tail), whereas the southern white-lipped python (L. fredparkeri) can reach up to 300 cm (9.8 ft) in total length. Both species are patternless, except the northern white-lipped python has some light markings on its postoculars, which are absent in the southern whitelip python.

== Behavior ==
Although mostly terrestrial, snakes of the genus Leiopython can and are known to occasionally climb. White-lipped pythons are reportedly aggressive, though this is reduced in those born and raised in captivity. These snakes have also been observed to regularly regurgitate fur balls from their prey.
