= Malaupaina =

Island in Solomon Islands

Coordinates: 10°15′09″S 161°58′30″E

Malaupaina is an island in the nation state of Solomon Islands; it is the southern one of the Olu Malau Islands (Three Sisters) located in Makira-Ulawa Province. It has an area of 6.37 km^{2} (2.46 sq mi).

The first recorded sighting by Europeans of Malaupaina was by the Spanish expedition of Álvaro de Mendaña in May 1568. More precisely the sighting of Malaupaina was due to a local voyage that set out from Guadalcanal in a small boat, in the accounts the brigantine Santiago, commanded by Alférez Hernando Énriquez and having Hernán Gallego as pilot. They charted the three Olu Malau islands as Las Tres Marias (The Three Marys in Spanish).
