= Enrico Alberto d'Albertis =

Italian navigator

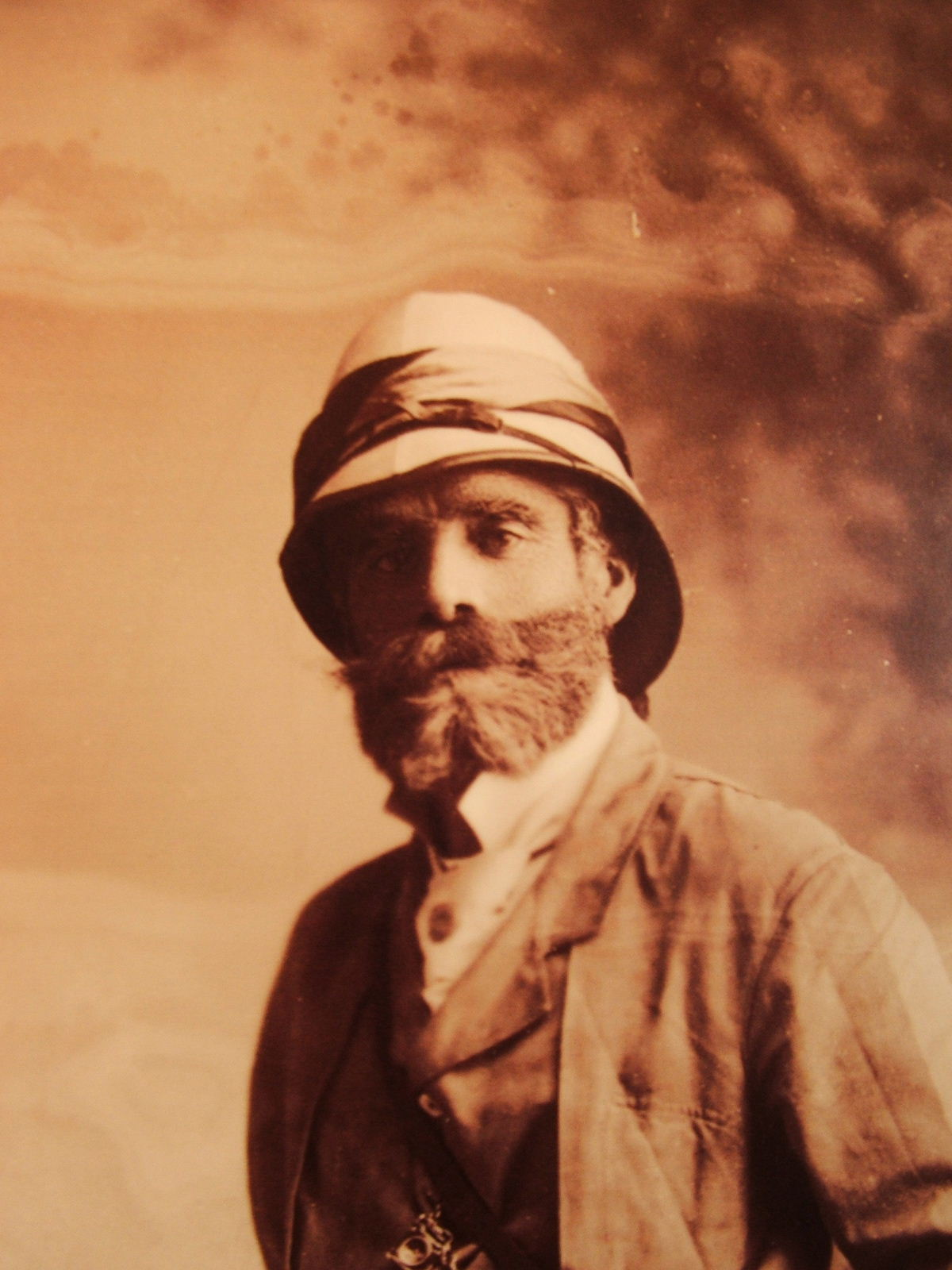
Enrico Alberto d'Albertis.

Enrico Alberto d'Albertis (23 March 1846 – 3 March 1932) was an Italian navigator, writer, philologist, ethnologist and philanthropist. His cousin Luigi Maria d'Albertis was also an explorer and naturalist.

== Biography ==
Born at Voltri, now part of Genoa, d'Albertis enlisted in the Royal Italian Navy and took part in the Battle of Lissa (1866). Later he served on the battleships Ancona and Formidabile. Later he moved to the Merchant Navy, and was the commander of Emilia, the lead ship of the first Italian convoy in the Suez Canal.

Starting from 1874, he dedicated his life to yachting.

After founding the first Italian Yacht Club in 1879, he recreated Christopher Columbus' journey to San Salvador by sailing two cutters, the Violante and the Corsaro, using nautical instruments he had handcrafted, modeled on the ones used by Columbus. In addition, D'Albertis traveled around the world three times, circumnavigated Africa once, and carried out archaeological digs with Arturo Issel. During World War I, he patrolled as a volunteer in Tyrrhenian Sea, receiving the Merit Cross.

D'Albertis personally designed the Castello d'Albertis, his residence in Genoa, where he showed his personal collection, including, among the others, weapons from his trips to Malaysia, Australia, Turkey, America and Spain. Some rooms were in typical yachts design. D'Albertis died at Genoa in 1932. His castle and collections were donated to the city of Genoa, who turned them into the Museum of World Cultures.

== Sailor and gentleman ==
The figure of the captain d'Albertis was certainly that of an original person, animated by a taste for challenges, discovery and exploration. In 1872, then at only twenty-six years of age he traveled the distance between his city, Genoa, and Turin using a wooden velocipede with metal wheels. Around the same time, the journey between the Ligurian capital and Nice was covered on foot and in record time.

His first trip around the world - which would open a series of memorable circumnavigations especially in the Mediterranean Sea and along the coasts of Europe - did it in 1877. The crossing that would have made him famous in the world of navigators organized it in 1891, the year before the four hundredth anniversary of the discovery of America by Cristoforo Colombo; d'Albertis had a specially built yacht - the Corsaro - and with it retraced Columbus's course. In twenty-seven days of navigation, using the same equipment used by his great predecessor, he reached the coasts of San Salvador. The jump from the island of Caribbean to New York, to receive the official greeting of the US authorities, was brief.

The journey back to the old continent was not as comfortable for d'Albertis as it had been, after all, the one going, although it happened on one of the four school ships of the Naval Academy of Livorno that were at anchor in the bay of San Lorenzo . The ship on which the captain was staying, in fact, ran into a storm that caused waves ten meters high while he was off the island of Terranova and only after a few days of navigation he managed to get out of the storm.

Returning to his city, d'Albertis then began to frequent the group of explorers and naturalists who had gathered around the Marquis Giacomo Doria; for his part he tried to make himself useful to the research by performing analyzes of the seas, fish and plants he came across during his travels. An explorer, but also a scientist at home, he conducted excavation campaigns with Arturo Issel in some of the many caves of which Liguria was and still is scattered.

=== That taciturn navigator in a seal-skin jacket ===
A suggestive - and presumably reliable - description of Captain Enrico Alberto d'Albertis, is that provided by the unknown chronicler of Caffaro - one of the most sold Genoese newspapers in Genoa at the end of the nineteenth century - who had the privilege of visiting the Castello d'Albertis residence for the first time, and meeting the explorer.

Thus the chronicler - also the author of a vignette depicting the captain - recalls the meeting in the supplement to the Caffaro on 1 May 1892:

The Captain of Albertis ... is one of the most beautiful sailor figures I have ever known.

He was dressed in this way, of a leather jacket of seal and with the cap of wool, a day of snow in which, struck down by wind and frozen by cold, he hosted me at Monte Galletto [the town where the castle still stands].

Large, thin, the skin tanned by long cruises, the bushy and bristly beard, the hair abandoned in a nice nonchalance, the eyebrows are thick and their two eyes are very bright.

And he adds:

Of few words, frank, at times almost rude, it abandons all the conventional offshoots of the label, but by approaching it one cannot [do] unless one appreciates that frank and loyal character, from which all the raw sturdiness of the sea. In all his writings he reveals an extraordinary competence in the things of the sea, of the needs of our military and merchant marine, of our businesses.

=== Tenacior catenis and exotic "memorabilia" ===
D'Albertis in his travels collected an extensive collection of weapons from Malaysia, Australia, Turkey, Americas and Spain: spears, arrows, crossbows of every kind and size, many costumes and a large number of exotic tools, now collected in Museum of World Cultures of Genoa.

Also in this case the anonymous chronicler of the Caffaro 'is of help', who recalls that to arouse his curiosity, during a visit to the Castle of Albertis, were in particular a dried siren ' 'and a' 'gong' '("species of" tan-tan ", which when put into practice could, even to say, compete with the bell of the [guard] tower, even after the much-feared recasting »).

«The art beautiful, modern and dazzling - the chronicler adds - is represented [in sculpture] by " [Cristoforo] Colombo Giovinetto "(see box above) by Giulio Monterverde and archeology from the armor of Fabrizio del Carretto of Ithodio magistro . »

Tenacior catenis is the motto of captain Enrico d'Albertis, who on the summit of Monte Galletto, in just over two years, raised - continues the prose of Caffaro - "that team of towers, small towers and loggias, which artistically grouped together make up its medieval castle.

The coat of arms of the Albertis is in field blue with chains of silver moving from the corners of the shield, joined in the middle by ring; in the fourth, below, a star of gold with five points; the enterprise bears a leopard nascent. The coat of arms summarizes the tenacity, strength, courage, courage, and wonderfully responds to the character of the knight he shines for ".
