= D'Albertis Castle =

Coordinates: 44°25′7.4″N 8°55′29.5″E

- Italian: Castello d'Albertis
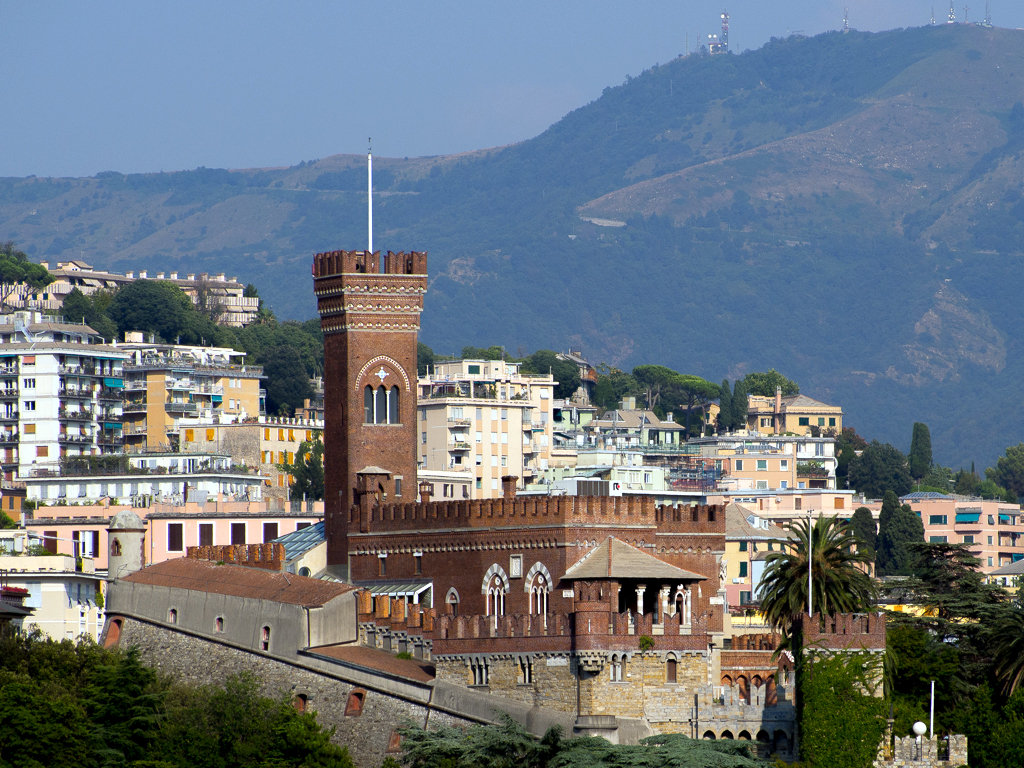
- D'Albertis Castle
- Interactive map of the D'Albertis Castle area

General information
- Status: In use
- Type: Castle
- Architectural style: Gothic Revival
- Location: Corso Dogali, 18, Genoa, Italy
- Construction started: 1886
- Completed: 1893

Technical details
- Floor count: 5

Design and construction
- Architect: Alfredo D'Andrade

Website
- www.museidigenova.it/it/content/castello-dalbertis

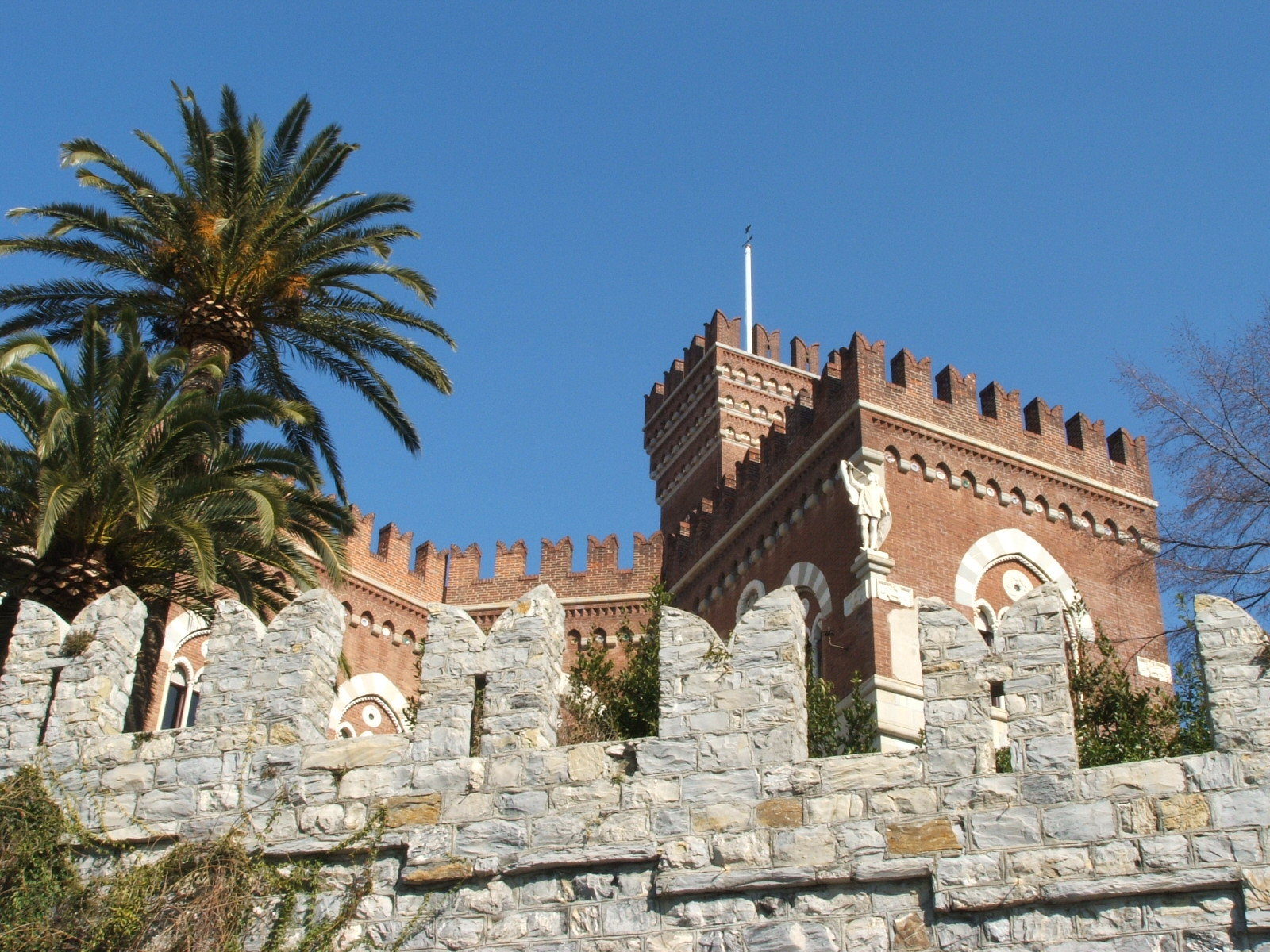
View of the Albertis Castle

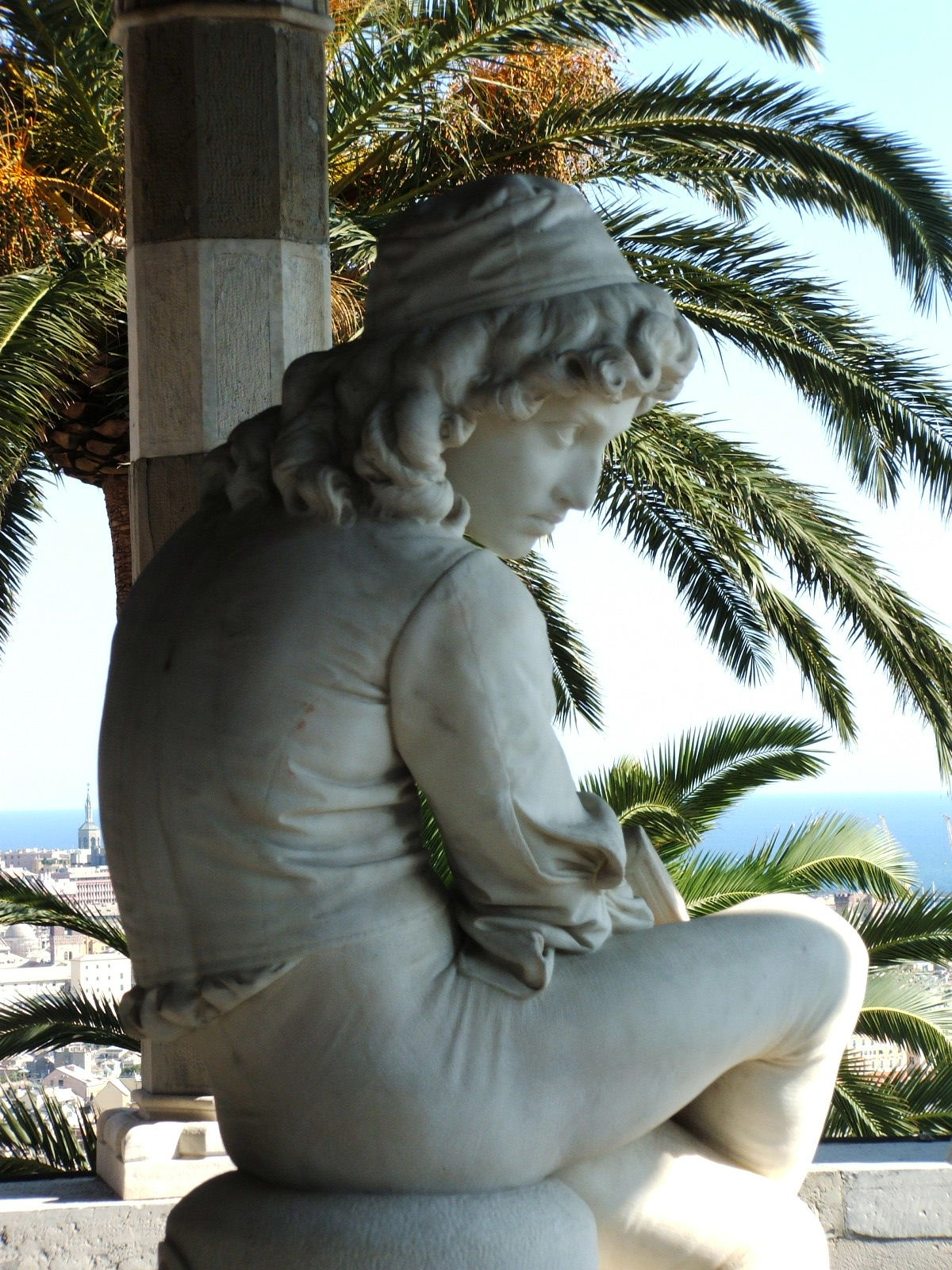
Sculpture of Christopher Columbus as a boy by Giulio Monteverde.

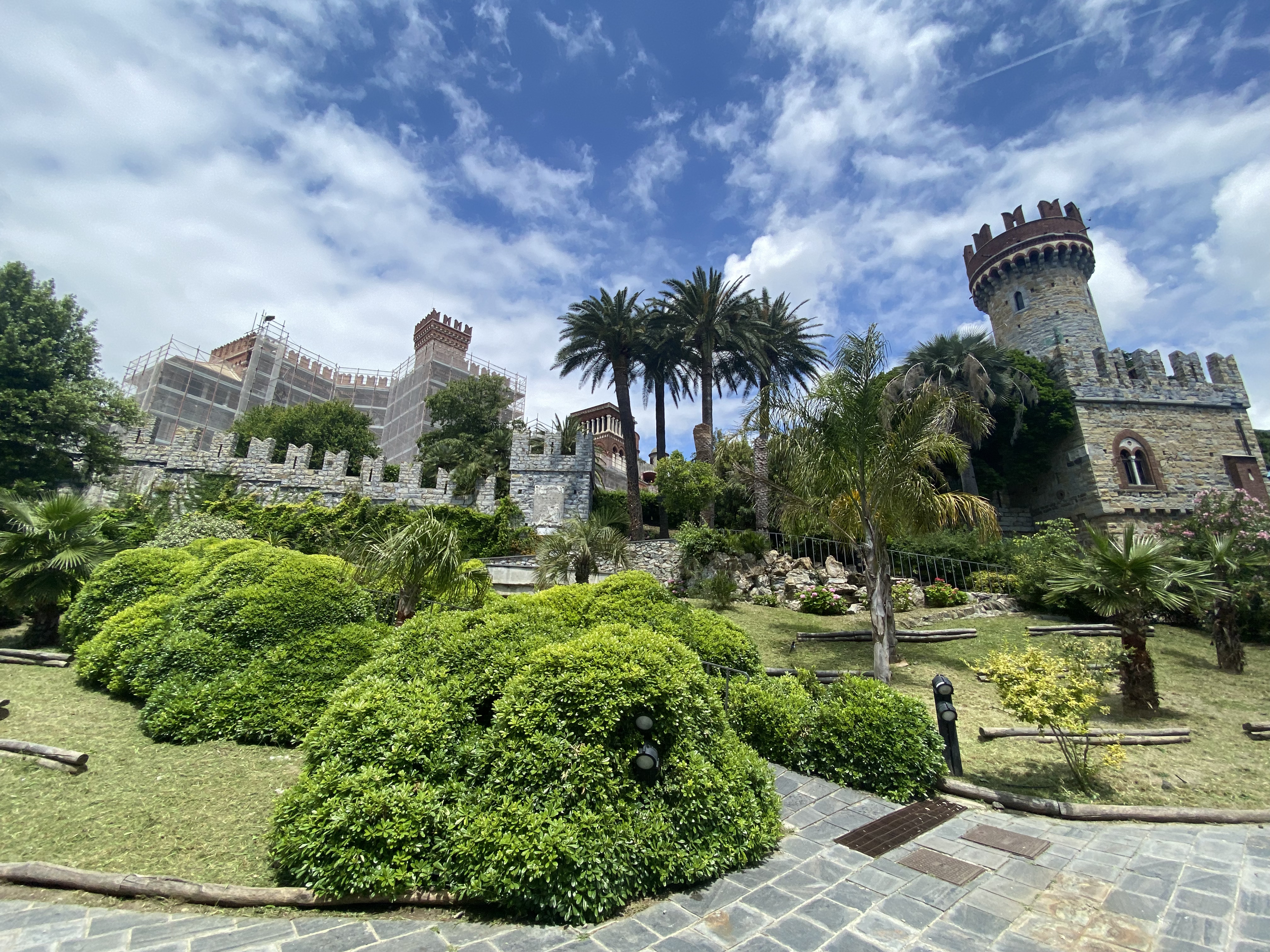
Castello D'Albertis in Summer 2024. Depicts the Castle under construction, repairing the brick and mortar exterior.

D'Albertis Castle (Italian: Castello d'Albertis) is a historic residence located in Genoa, in the north-western region of Italy. The castle was the former home of sea captain Enrico Alberto d'Albertis and was donated to the city of Genoa upon his death in 1932. Today, it houses the Museo delle Culture del Mondo (Museum of World Cultures), which was inaugurated in 2004.

== Description ==
D'Albertis designed the castle in the style of an architectural collage with a Gothic Revival appearance inspired by palaces in Florence and castles of Aosta Valley.

Erected between 1886 and 1892 under the supervision of Gothic Revivalist Alfredo D'Andrade, the castle is located on the site of a 13th-century fortified area, which had been reinforced in the 16th century. Alberto not only based his design on the city's foundation, he incorporated and preserved the foundations of the bastion and one of the turrets.

Inaugurated for the celebrations of 400 years of Columbus' discover of America, it was the first villa-castle built in Genoa.

From top of the hill of Monte Galletto (or Montegalletto), one of the hills in the district of Castelletto, the castle dominates Genoa with a view of the Ligurian Sea.

== Collections ==
The museum includes ethnographic and archaeological findings collected by both Enrico and Luigi Maria d'Albertis during their trips to Africa, America (from Canada to Tierra del Fuego), New Guinea and Oceania. There is a large number of weapons from Sudan and the Zambesi area Chinese spears and European halberds. There are several exemplars of Canadian and American plains indigenous people, made in buffalo and deer leather and covered by porcupine thorns; also findings belonging to the Maya civilization from Honduras are present.

It also exhibits models of ships and yachts, nautical instruments, photographs and the volumes of d'Albertis personal library.

A separate section dedicated to music (the Museo delle Musiche dei Popoli, "Museum of Peoples' Music") exhibits musical instruments from the whole world.

== See also ==
- Ascensore Castello d'Albertis-Montegalletto
- List of castles in Italy
- Mackenzie Castle
