= Albertis =

Albertis may refer to:

- Albertis Castle, home of Captain Enrico Alberto d'Albertis in Genoa, Italy
- D'Albertis Junction, located at the confluence of Ok Tedi River with the Fly River downstream from Kiunga, Papua New Guinea
- Albertis S. Harrison, Jr. (1907–1995), governor of Virginia from 1962 to 1966
- G.S.D. Bogliasco D'Albertis, an Italian football club from 1950 to 2013

== See also ==
- D'Albertis
- Alberti (surname)
