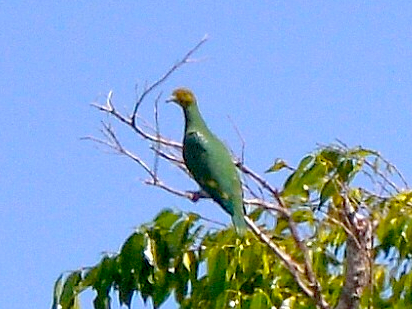

Conservation status
- Least Concern (IUCN 3.1)

Scientific classification
- Kingdom: Animalia
- Phylum: Chordata
- Class: Aves
- Order: Columbiformes
- Family: Columbidae
- Genus: Ptilinopus
- Species: P. tannensis

Binomial name
- Ptilinopus tannensis (Latham, 1790)

= Tanna fruit dove =

Species of bird

The Tanna fruit dove (Ptilinopus tannensis) is a species of bird in the family Columbidae. It is endemic to Vanuatu.

Its natural habitats are subtropical or tropical moist lowland forest, subtropical or tropical moist montane forest, and heavily degraded former forest.

== Description ==
The average length of the Tanna fruit dove is 28 – 30 cm. Its face is yellow and fades into dark green with touches of yellow towards its body. The males have a silver patch below their necks on each side of their bodies. The female Tanna fruit dove lacks the silver patches but has white on its lower body. Its legs are purply red, and it has a bluish-gray bill. The younger Tanna fruit doves are green with yellow rims on the end of each feather.

== Population and conservations ==
The Tanna fruit dove is monotypic. As of 2024, the population trend is decreasing. Although it is not globally threatened, the Tanna fruit dove is experiencing a slow decline due to the loss of suitable large trees. The current population size is unknown. It was previously considered near threatened but is now normally found in all habitats. The average generation length is 3.2 years. Threats to the bird include hunting, trapping, logging, and wood harvesting.

== Distribution and habitat ==
The Tanna fruit dove can be found in Vanuatu, a country in Oceania. This bird lives in degraded habitats that have fruit trees. The Tanna fruit dove can be found in a terrestrial or artificial forest. Its habitat types are forests, open woodlands, parklands, plantations, and gardens. It is most commonly found in lowlands but can also be found in mountains under 1500 m. The Tanna fruit doves' upper elevation limit is 500 meters. The Tanna fruit dove travels between islands. Their movement patterns are nomadic because of the ripening of fruit crops.

== Diet and feeding ==
The Tanna fruit doves are frugivorous, meaning an animal that feeds on fruit. Their most common foods include strangler figs and mahogany trees. They feed mainly in the canopies. They do their feeding in dense areas where it's difficult to be spotted and they feed by themselves, in pairs, or in small groups.

== Nests and reproduction ==
The Tanna fruit doves' nests are thin and made up of twigs, typically found high up in trees. They lay one white egg. Both the mom and the dad care for the young.

== Vocalizations ==
The Tanna fruit dove's call is a repeated single coo every 2.5 seconds. The note gradually increases in volume and then has a sudden end.
