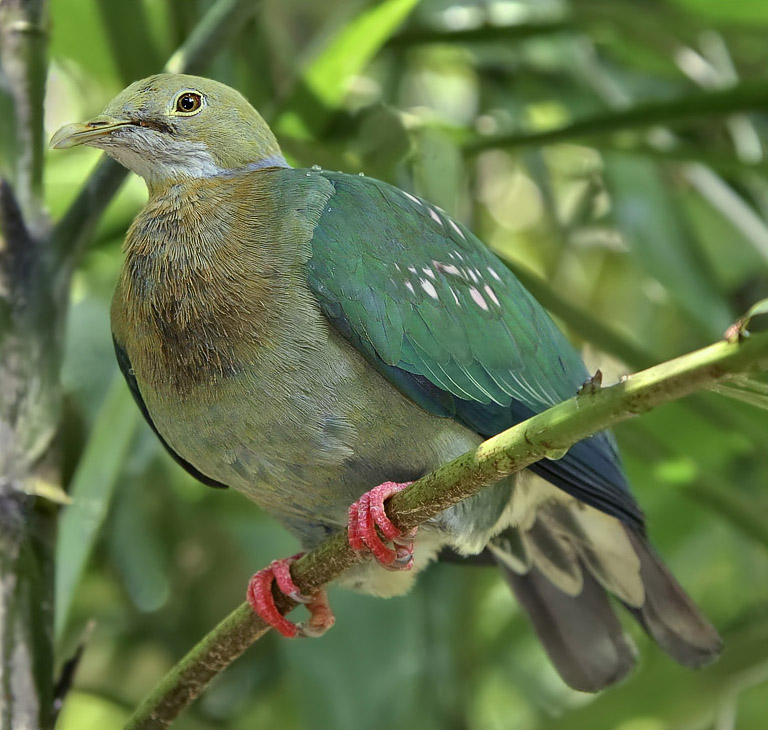
- In Jurong Bird Park

Conservation status
- Least Concern (IUCN 3.1)

Scientific classification
- Kingdom: Animalia
- Phylum: Chordata
- Class: Aves
- Order: Columbiformes
- Family: Columbidae
- Genus: Ptilinopus
- Species: P. perlatus

Binomial name
- Ptilinopus perlatus (Temminck, 1835)

= Pink-spotted fruit dove =

Species of bird

The pink-spotted fruit dove (Ptilinopus perlatus) is a species of bird in the family Columbidae. It is found in forest and woodland in lowland and foothills of New Guinea and nearby smaller islands. It is widespread and generally common.

== Taxonomy and systematics ==
The pink-spotted fruit dove is one of over 50 species in the genus Ptilinopus.

Alternative names for the pink-spotted fruit dove include pink-spotted fruit pigeon.

=== Subspecies ===
Three subspecies of the pink-spotted fruit dove are recognised.

- P. p. perlatus – Temminck, 1835: the nominate subspecies
- P. p. zonurus – Salvadori, 1876:
- P. p. plumbeicollis – Meyer, A.B.,1890:

== Description ==
As most other fruit doves, it is largely green. The chest is duller and browner, the throat and nape are grey-white, and, uniquely for a fruit dove, the wings are spotted pink. The face and crown are usually olive-green, but this is replaced by pale grey in the north-eastern subspecies plumbeicollis. The male and female are essentially identical.

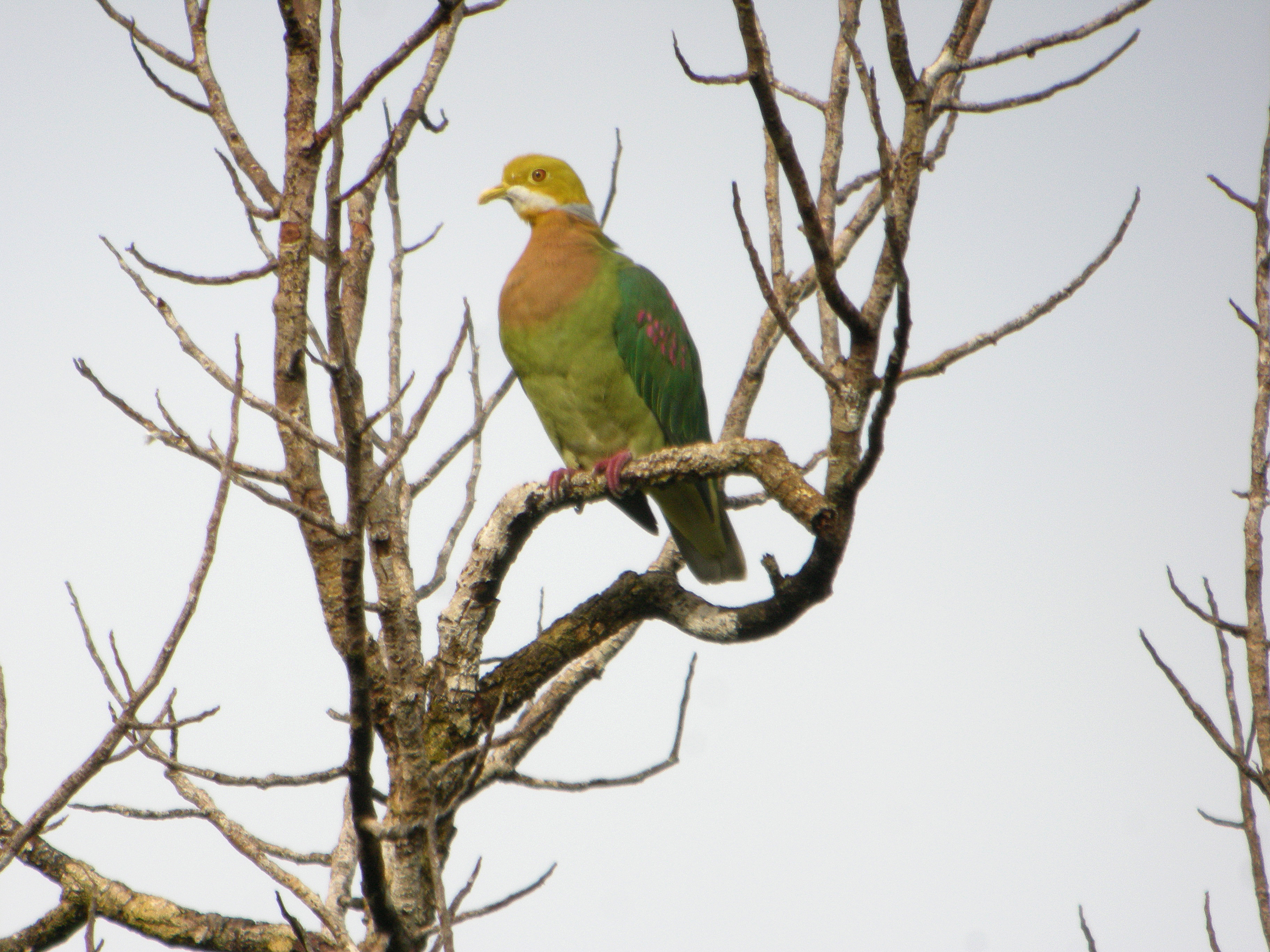
In Papua New Guinea
