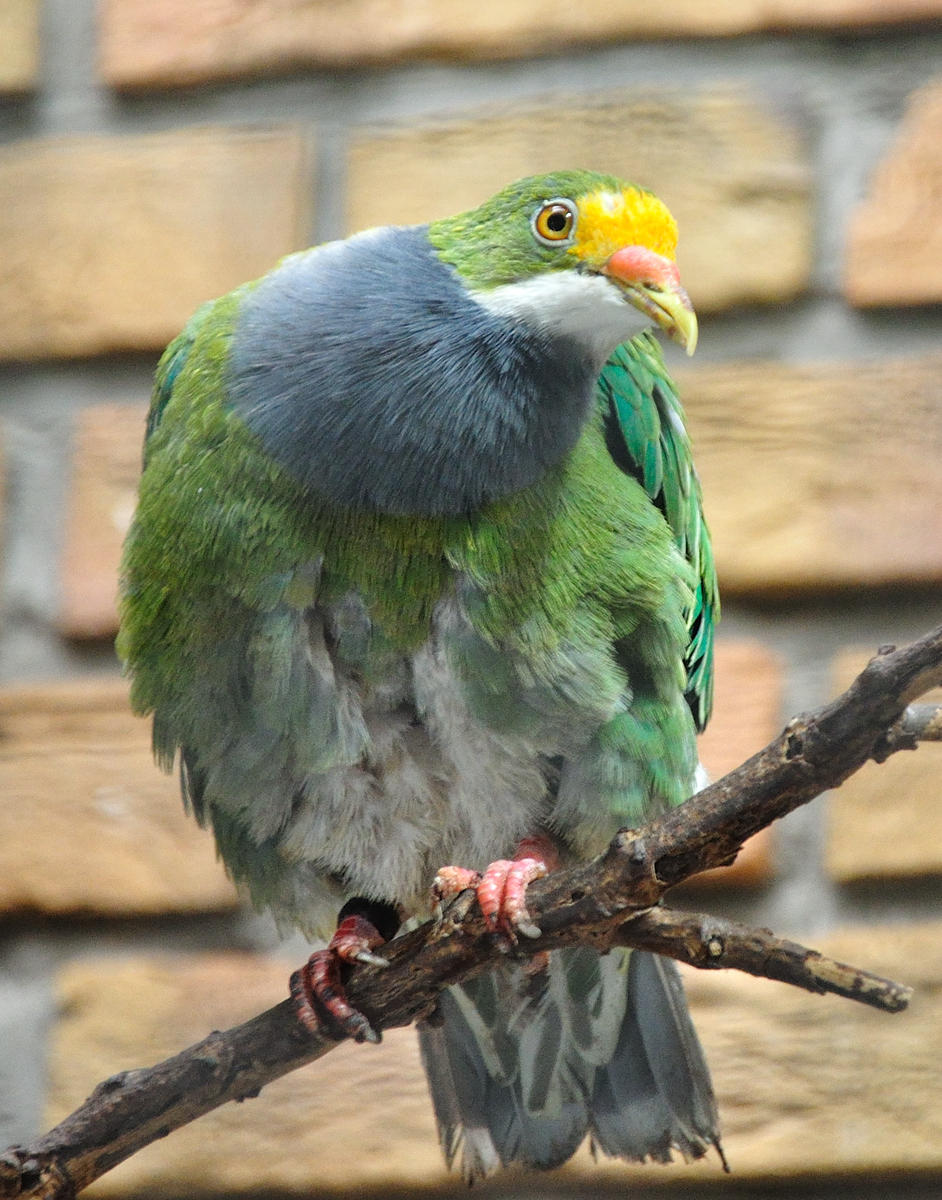
- At Berlin Zoo

Conservation status
- Least Concern (IUCN 3.1)

Scientific classification
- Kingdom: Animalia
- Phylum: Chordata
- Class: Aves
- Order: Columbiformes
- Family: Columbidae
- Genus: Ptilinopus
- Species: P. aurantiifrons

Binomial name
- Ptilinopus aurantiifrons Gray, 1858

= Orange-fronted fruit dove =

Species of bird

The orange-fronted fruit dove (Ptilinopus aurantiifrons) is a species of bird in the family Columbidae, measuring 22–23 cm (8.7–9.1 in) in length and weighing approximately 136 g (4.8 oz). P. aurantiifrons is characterized by a dull green body, a distinctive bright orange forehead, and a gray collar encircling the neck. The female displays duller coloration, and juvenile P. aurantiifrons have not been described.

The species is found across Papua New Guinea, with a range extending from sea level to 300 m (980 ft). The orange-fronted fruit dove is localized and is described as sedentary (non-migratory).

== Taxonomy ==
The orange-fronted fruit doves are members of the genus Ptilinopus in the family Columbidae. Birds of this genus are typified by small to medium-sized bodies and vibrant plumage. The specific epithet aurantiifrons is derived from Latin aurantius, meaning 'orange' and frons, meaning 'front' or 'forehead'.

== Description ==
The orange-fronted fruit dove is a small/medium sized bird that ranges in length from 22–23 cm and weighs 136 grams. Its body color primarily consists of a dull green, with a vibrant orange forehead. It has a bright yellow beak, and a white throat and gray chest that wraps around the entire neck. Pastel purple spots fill the wings and extend to the end of the fan-shaped tail. The legs and feet are a bright maroon color with light grey claws.

== Ecology and behavior ==
=== Voice ===
P. aurantiifrons vocalizations are described as a medium to low pitch of "hoo" followed by a seesaw (a series of alternative high and low notes). Each note of the "hoo" rises in tone. The seesaw pattern features six notes with the first, third, and fifth rising in pitch while the other notes descend. Additionally, P. aurantiifrons produce a sequence beginning with a single low note, followed by a louder series that gradually decreases in pitch.

=== Feeding ===
P. aurantiifrons is observed in flocks, but also forages alone or in pairs. The orange-fronted fruit dove is frugivorous, consuming fruits from various plant types. Moraceae (mulberry family), Combretaceae (white mangrove family), and Arecaceae (palm family) are included in the primary diet of P. aurantiifrons.

=== Breeding ===
Nesting takes place from the middle of the dry season to at least the early wet season; the breeding season is from September to April. The nest is sturdier than those typical of the genus and is positioned at a height of 2.4 to 4.6 meters (7 ft 10 in to 15 ft 1 in) in trees or shrubs. P. aurantiifrons lays a single white egg and does not incubate tightly.

== Distribution and habitat ==
The Orange-fronted fruit doves are found in New Guinea. Its natural habitats are subtropical or tropical moist lowland forest, subtropical or tropical mangrove forest, woodland, savanna and urban areas. It is abundant along the eastern coast of New Guinea and the D'Entrecasteaux islands.

== Threats and protection ==
Conservation details of this species are limited. The orange-fronted fruit dove is not considered globally threatened and is classified as Least Concern. P. aurantiifrons are regarded as common and abundant locally.
