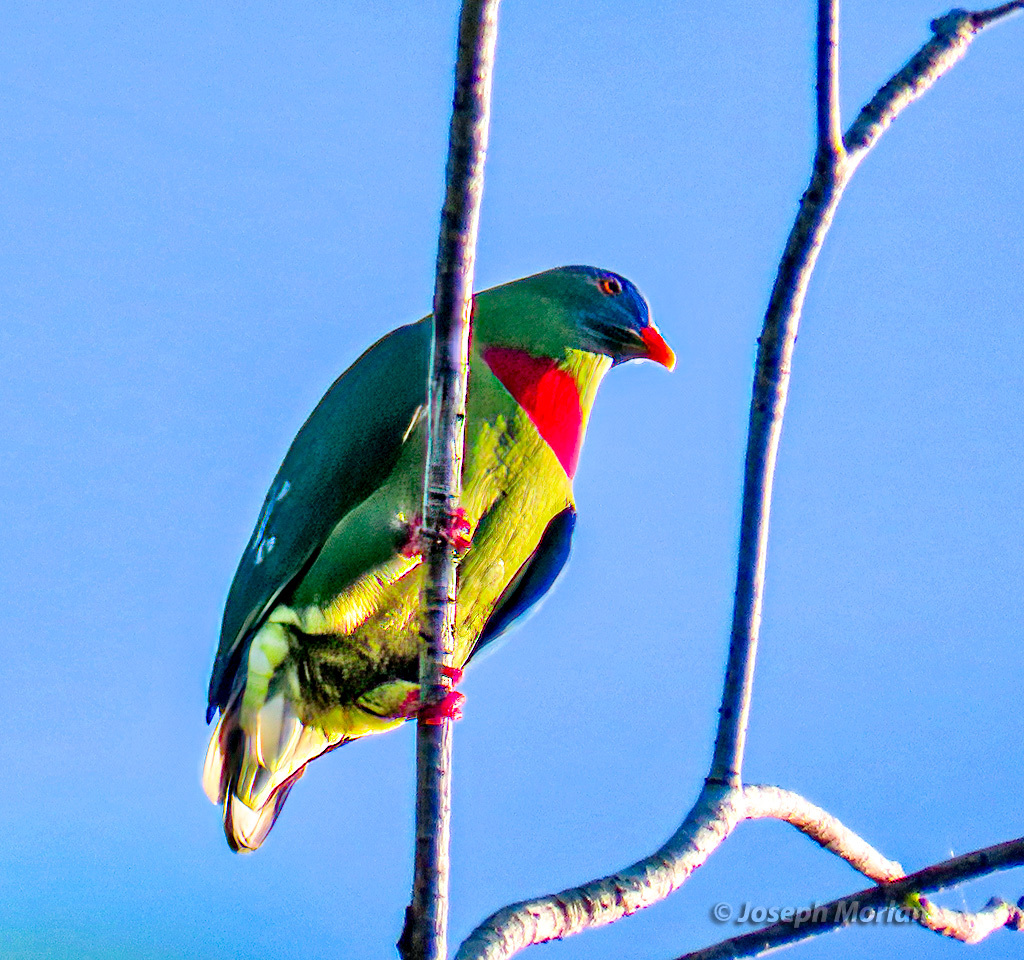

Conservation status
- Least Concern (IUCN 3.1)

Scientific classification
- Kingdom: Animalia
- Phylum: Chordata
- Class: Aves
- Order: Columbiformes
- Family: Columbidae
- Genus: Ptilinopus
- Species: P. viridis

Binomial name
- Ptilinopus viridis (Linnaeus, 1766)

Synonyms
- Columba viridis Linnaeus, 1766

= Claret-breasted fruit dove =

Species of bird

The claret-breasted fruit dove (Ptilinopus viridis) is a species of bird in the family Columbidae. It is found in the Moluccas, New Guinea and the Solomon Islands archipelago. Its natural habitat is subtropical or tropical moist lowland forests.

== Taxonomy ==
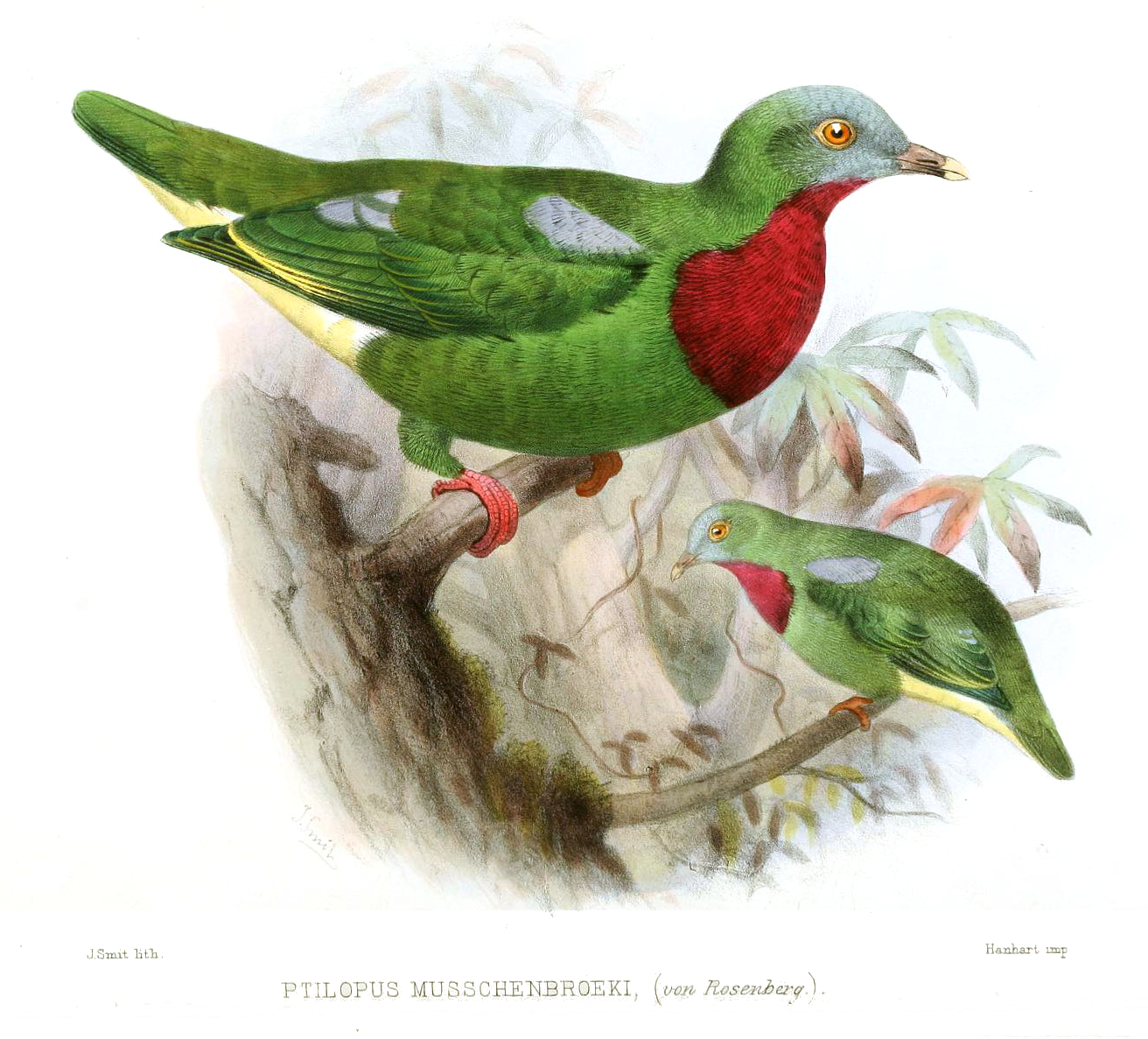
Illustration by Joseph Smit

In 1760 the French zoologist Mathurin Jacques Brisson included a description of the claret-breasted fruit dove in his six volume Ornithologie based on a specimen collected on Ambon Island, one of the Maluku Islands of Indonesia. He used the French name La tourterelle verte d'Amboine and the Latin Turtur viridis amboinensis. Although Brisson coined Latin names, these do not conform to the binomial system and are not recognised by the International Commission on Zoological Nomenclature. When in 1766 the Swedish naturalist Carl Linnaeus updated his Systema Naturae for the twelfth edition, he added 240 species that had been previously described by Brisson. One of these was the claret-breasted fruit dove which he placed with all the other pigeons in the genus Columba. Linnaeus included a brief description, coined the binomial name Columba viridis and cited Brisson's work. The specific name viridis is the Latin word for "green". This fruit dove is now placed in the genus Ptilinopus that was introduced in 1825 by the English naturalist William Swainson.

Six subspecies are recognised:

- P. v. viridis (Linnaeus, 1766) – south Maluku Islands
- P. v. pectoralis (Wagler, 1829) – Raja Ampat Islands, Bird's Head Peninsula (northwest New Guinea)
- P. v. geelvinkianus Schlegel, 1871 – Cenderawasih Bay Islands
- P. v. salvadorii Rothschild, 1892 – north New Guinea, Yapen Island (off northwest New Guinea)
- P. v. vicinus Hartert, 1895 – Trobriand Islands, D'Entrecasteaux Islands (off east New Guinea)
- P. v. lewisii Ramsay, EP, 1882 – Manus Island, Lihir Island and Nissan Island to west Solomon Islands

== Description ==
The claret-breasted fruit dove is 20–21 cm (7.9–8.3 in) in length. The plumage is mainly green apart from a well-defined patch of dark red-brown feathers on the throat and upper breast. The face and forecrown are bluish grey and shoulder has a bluish grey patch.
