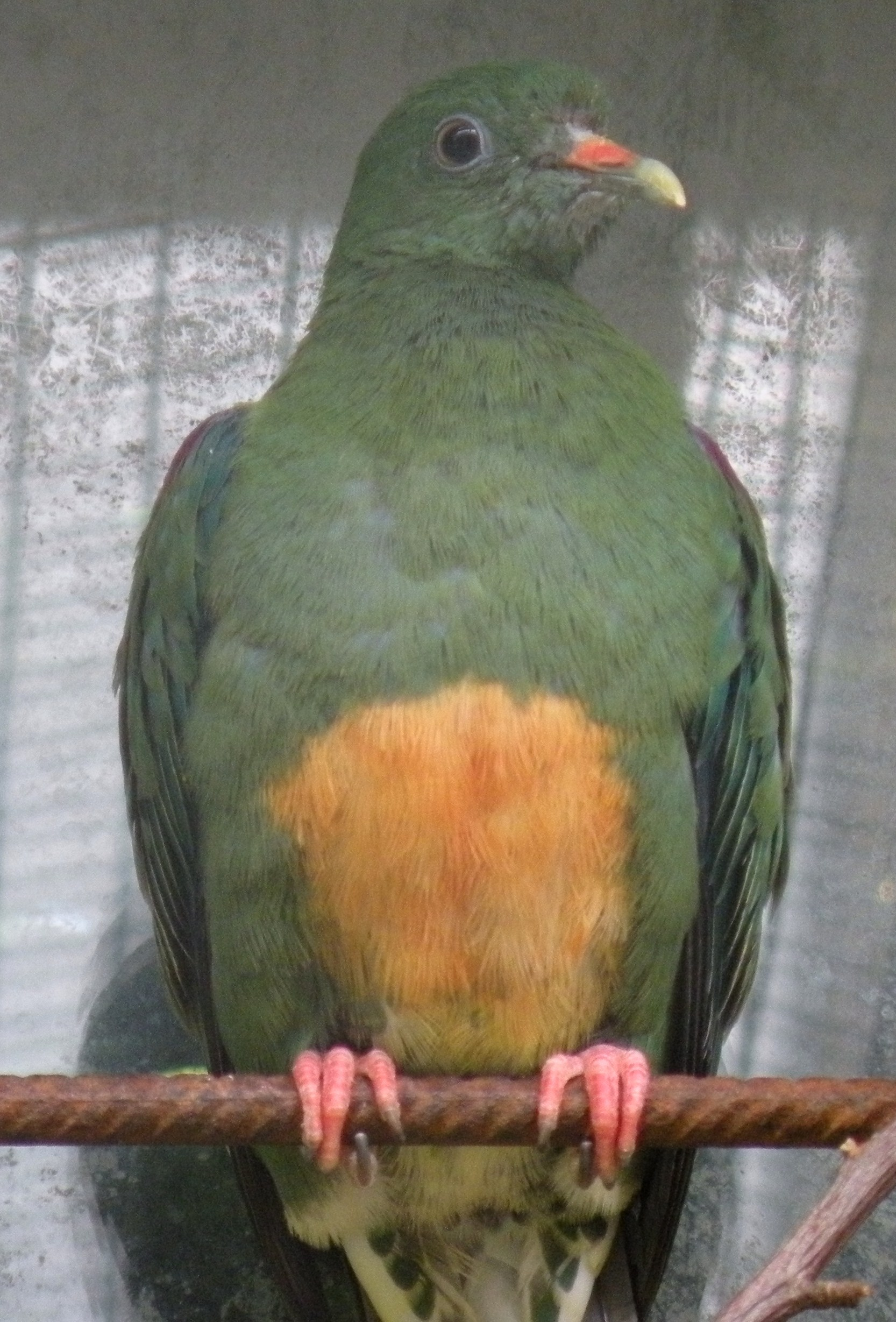

Conservation status
- Least Concern (IUCN 3.1)

Scientific classification
- Kingdom: Animalia
- Phylum: Chordata
- Class: Aves
- Order: Columbiformes
- Family: Columbidae
- Genus: Ptilinopus
- Species: P. iozonus

Binomial name
- Ptilinopus iozonus Gray, 1858

= Orange-bellied fruit dove =

Species of bird

The orange-bellied fruit dove (Ptilinopus iozonus) is a small (21 cm in length) pigeon with mainly green plumage, distinguished by a large orange patch on the lower breast and belly, a small lilac shoulder patch, pale yellow undertail coverts, and a grey terminal band on the tail.

== Taxonomy and systematics ==
=== Subspecies ===
- P. i. humeralis – Wallace, 1862:
- P. i. jobiensis – Schlegel, 1873:
- P. i. pseudohumeralis – Rand, 1938:
- P. i. finschi – Mayr, 1931:
- P. i. iozonus – Gray, 1858:

== Distribution and habitat ==
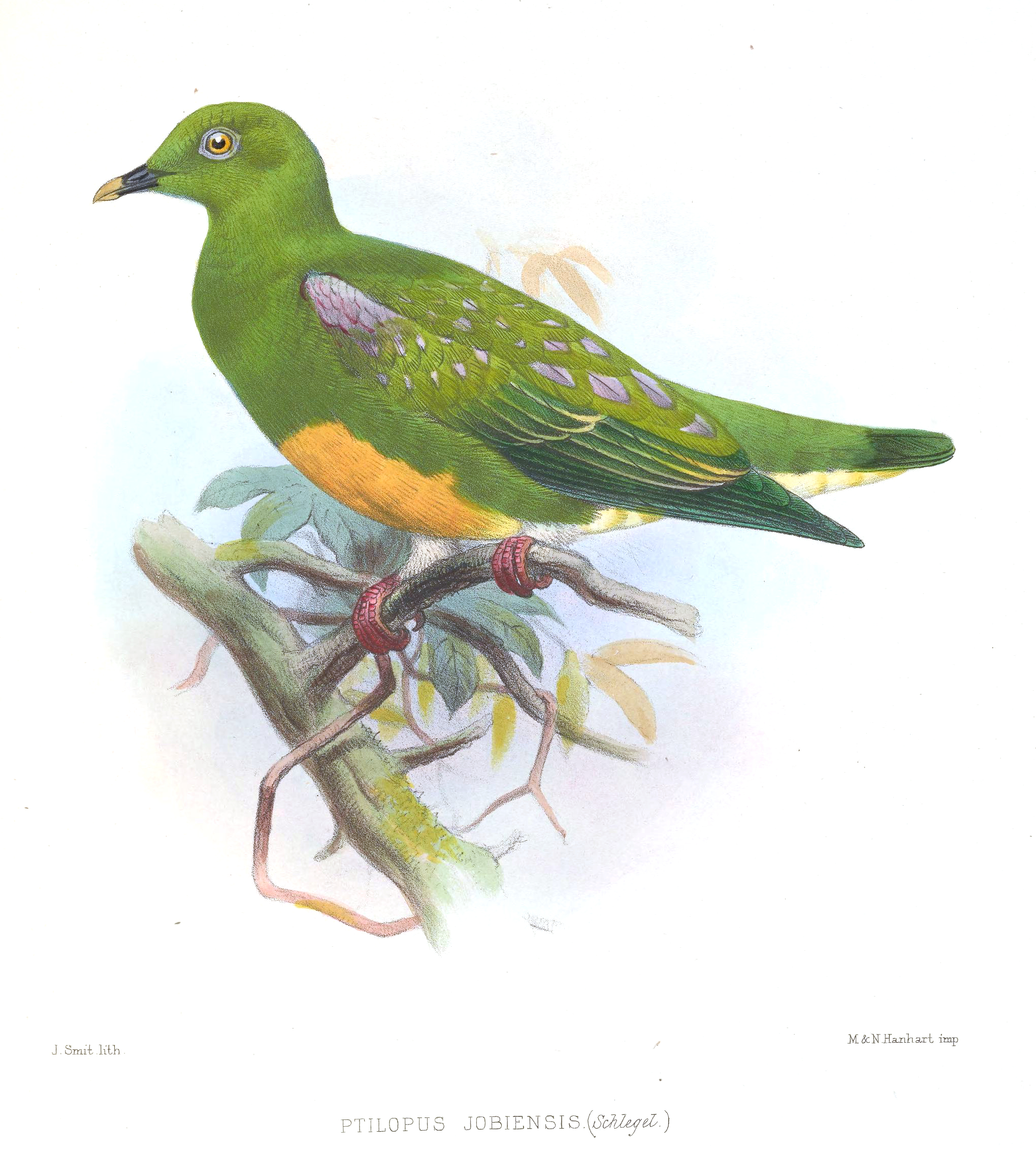
P. i. jobiensis

The dove is found in New Guinea, the Aru Islands and western Papuan islands where it inhabits lowland rainforest, secondary forest and mangroves. It has been recorded from Boigu Island, Queensland, Australian territory in northern Torres Strait.

== Behaviour ==
=== Feeding ===
The dove eats the fruit from forest trees, mainly figs.

=== Breeding ===
The dove lays a single egg on a platform of small sticks high in a forest tree.
