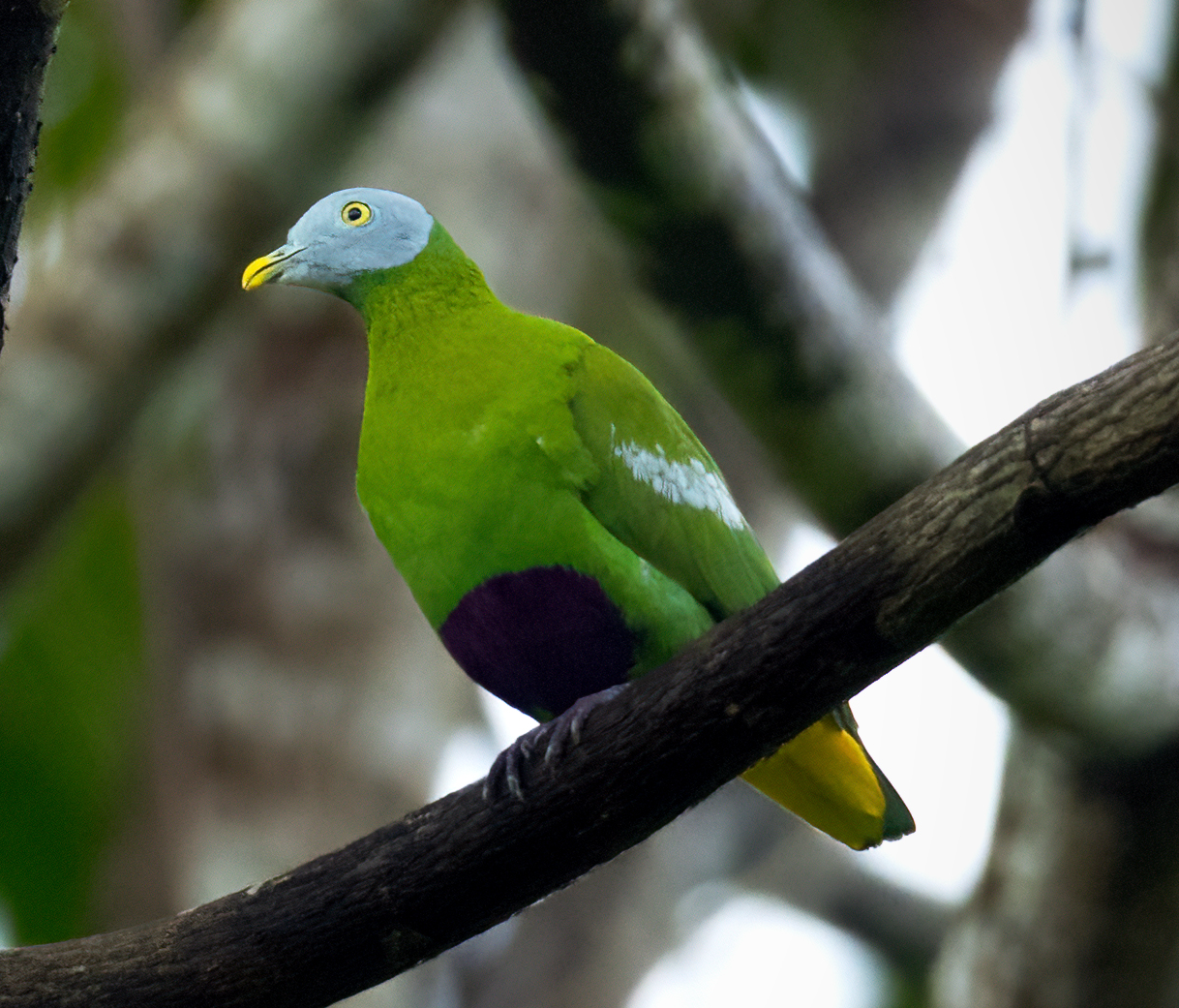

Conservation status
- Least Concern (IUCN 3.1)

Scientific classification
- Kingdom: Animalia
- Phylum: Chordata
- Class: Aves
- Order: Columbiformes
- Family: Columbidae
- Genus: Ptilinopus
- Species: P. hyogastrus

Binomial name
- Ptilinopus hyogastrus (Temminck, 1824)

= Grey-headed fruit dove =

Species of bird

The grey-headed fruit dove or gray-headed fruit dove (Ptilinopus hyogastrus, Ptilinopus hyogastra or Ptilinopus hyogaster) is a species of bird in the family Columbidae. It is endemic to the northern Moluccas.

== Habitat ==
Its natural habitat is subtropical or tropical moist lowland forests.

== Description ==
It is mostly green except for a grey head, red eyes and black yellow-tipped beak.
