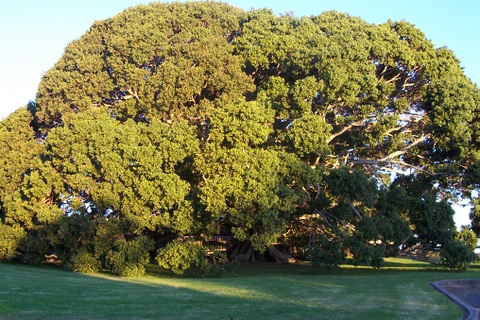
- Ficus obliqua, Milton, New South Wales
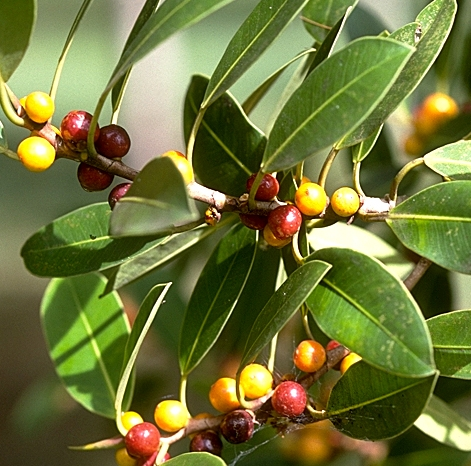

Conservation status
- Least Concern (IUCN 3.1)

Scientific classification
- Kingdom: Plantae
- Clade: Tracheophytes
- Clade: Angiosperms
- Clade: Eudicots
- Clade: Rosids
- Order: Rosales
- Family: Moraceae
- Genus: Ficus
- Species: F. obliqua

Binomial name
- Ficus obliqua G.Forst.

Synonyms
- Ficus aphanoneura Warb.; Ficus backhousei (Miq.) Miq.; Ficus boothiana Miq.; Ficus elegans Miq., nom. illeg. homonym. post.; Ficus eugenioides (Miq.) F.Muell. ex Miq.; Ficus graeffii Warb.; Ficus laevis Desf., nom. illeg. homonym. post.; Ficus tryonii F.M.Bailey; Ficus virginea Banks & Sol. ex Hiern; Urostigma backhousei Miq.; Urostigma brachypodium Miq., not validly publ.; Urostigma eugenioides Miq.; Urostigma obliquum (G.Forst.) Miq.

= Ficus obliqua =

Small-leaved fig

Tree species; the small-leaved fig

Ficus obliqua, commonly known as the small-leaved fig, is a tree in the family Moraceae, native to eastern Australia, New Guinea, eastern Indonesia to Sulawesi and islands in the southwestern Pacific Ocean. Previously known for many years as Ficus eugenioides, it is a banyan of the genus Ficus, which contains around 750 species worldwide in warm climates, including the edible fig (Ficus carica). Beginning life as a seedling, which grows on other plants (epiphyte) or on rocks (lithophyte), F. obliqua can grow to 60 m (200 ft) high and nearly as wide with a pale grey buttressed trunk, and glossy green leaves.

The small round yellow fruit ripen and turn red at any time of year, although ripening peaks in autumn and winter (April to July). Known as a syconium, the fruit is an inverted inflorescence with the flowers lining an internal cavity. Ficus obliqua is pollinated by two species of fig wasp—Pleistodontes greenwoodi and P. xanthocephalus. Many species of bird, including pigeons, parrots and various passerines, eat the fruit. The range is along the east coast from Queensland, through New South Wales in rainforest, savanna woodland, sclerophyll forest and gallery forest. It is used as a shade tree in parks and public spaces, and is well-suited for use as an indoor plant or in bonsai. All parts of the tree have been used in traditional medicine in Fiji.

== Taxonomy ==
Commonly known as the small-leaved fig, Ficus obliqua was described by German naturalist Georg Forster in 1786 based on type material collected in Vanuatu. Dutch botanist Friedrich Miquel described Urostigma eugenioides from Albany Island in Queensland in 1861, which was reclassified by Victorian Government Botanist Ferdinand von Mueller as Ficus eugenioides in 1867, and it was known as this for many years. However, as Forster's name is older, it takes precedence. The specific epithet is the Latin adjective obliquus, meaning "oblique", although the attribute it refers to is unclear. Frederick Manson Bailey described Ficus tryonii in 1906, from a collection at altitude on Middle Percy Island in the Whitsunday Islands off central Queensland, which is now regarded as F. obliqua. Joseph Banks and Daniel Solander collected and named Ficus virginea from Booby Island in 1770, which was synonymised with F. obliqua by William Philip Hiern in 1901.

The species is currently regarded as monotypic. Three varieties of Ficus obliqua were recognised until 2001—F. obliqua var. petiolaris, F. obliqua var. obliqua, and F. obliqua var. puberula from Western Australia. A revision of the group led to the conclusion that F. obliqua var. petiolaris belonged in the species F. rubiginosa. F. obliqua var. puberula was found to be more distantly related to obliqua than rubiginosa and hence has been reclassified as a separate species, Ficus brachypoda.

With over 750 species, Ficus is one of the largest angiosperm genera. Based on morphology, English botanist E. J. H. Corner divided the genus into four subgenera, which was later expanded to six. In this classification, Ficus obliqua was placed in subseries Malvanthereae, series Malvanthereae, section Malvanthera of the subgenus Urostigma. In his reclassification of the Australian Malvanthera, Australian botanist Dale J. Dixon altered the delimitations of the series within the section, but left this species in the series Malvanthereae.

In a study published in 2008, Nina Rønsted and colleagues analysed the DNA sequences from the nuclear ribosomal internal and external transcribed spacers (ITS and ETS), and the glyceraldehyde-3-phosphate dehydrogenase (G3pdh) region, in the first molecular analysis of the section Malvanthera. They found F. obliqua to be most closely related to three species of the arid Northern Territory (F. platypoda, F. subpuberula and F. lilliputiana) and classified it in a new series Obliquae in the subsection Platypodeae. The species had remained a transitional rainforest species while its relatives radiated into dryer regions.

== Description ==
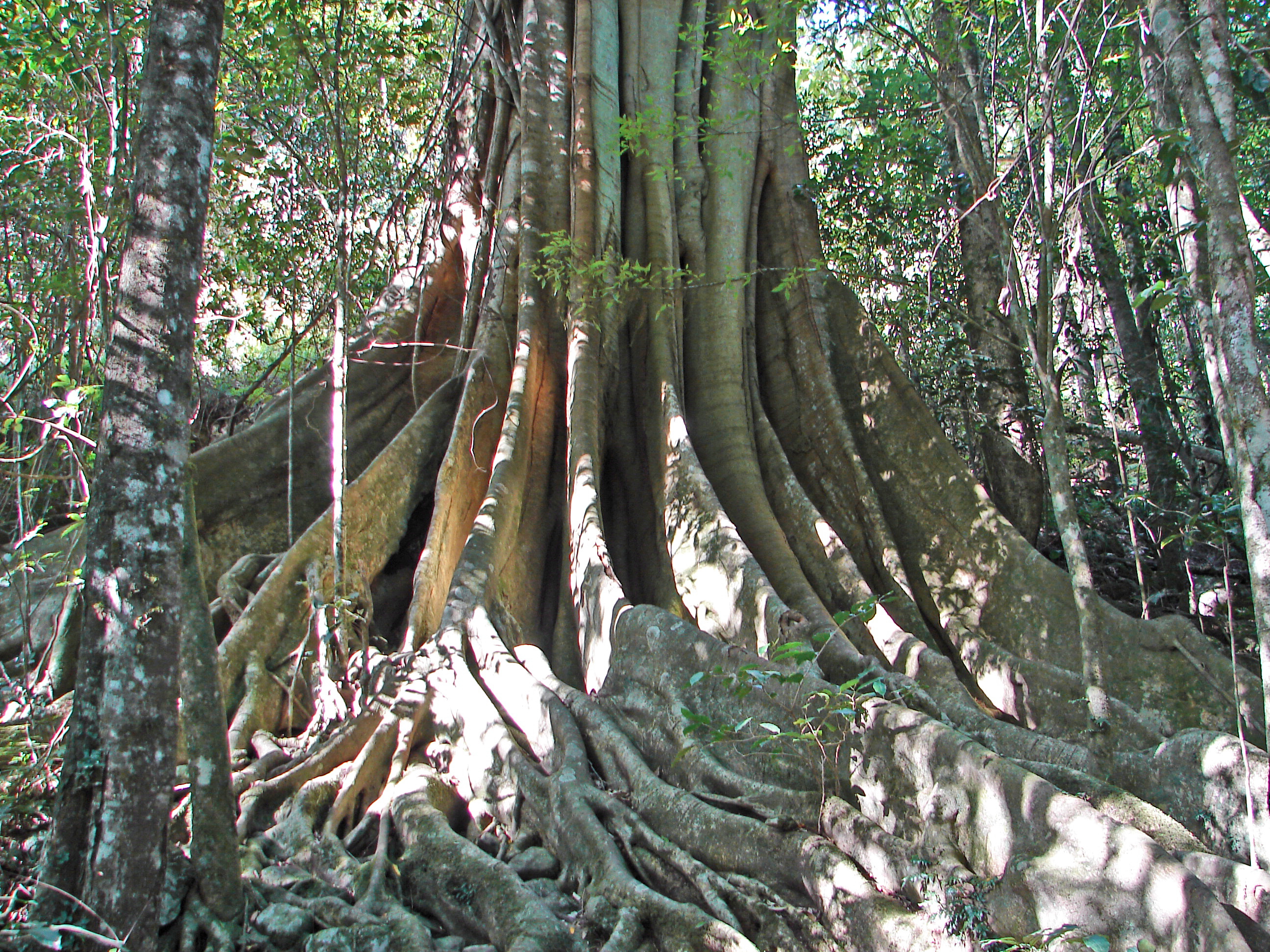
A large buttressed trunk of Ficus obliqua, Allyn River, Barrington Tops, Australia.

Ficus obliqua is a tree, which may reach 15–60 m (49–197 ft) in height with a similar crown width. It has smooth thin grey bark with lighter-coloured lenticels, and a buttressed trunk, which may reach 3 m (9.8 ft) in diameter. The glossy green leaves are elliptic to oblong in shape and measure 5–8 cm (2.0–3.1 in) long by 2–3.5 cm (0.79–1.38 in) wide on 1–2 cm (0.39–0.79 in) petioles. They are alternately arranged on the stems. Growing in pairs, the round yellow fruit turn orange or orange-red dotted with darker red and reaches a diameter of 6 to 10 mm (0.24 to 0.39 in) upon ripening over April to July, although fruit can appear at other times of year. As is the case with all figs, the fruit is an inverted inflorescence known as a syconium, with tiny flowers arising from the inner surface. Ficus obliqua is monoecious—both male and female flowers are produced by the same plant, and in fact in the same fruit. Within any given fruit, female flowers mature several weeks before the male flowers.

Historically, there has been some confusion between Ficus obliqua and the related F. rubiginosa. F. obliqua can be distinguished by its smaller fruit on shorter stalks and its glabrous (hairless) leaves; in addition, the petioles have ascending hyaline hairs. Some forms of F. rubiginosa have both leaves and petioles glabrous while others have both covered in fine fur. The syconia of F. obliqua are smaller, measuring 4.3–11.9 mm long and 4.4–11.0 mm in diameter, compared with 7.4–17.3 mm long and 7.6–17.3 mm diameter for F. rubiginosa. Ficus brachypoda is a lithophytic plant from arid northern and western Australia, with a short petiole and leaf shape aligning it with Ficus platypoda.

== Distribution and habitat ==
Ficus obliqua occurs from Mount Dromedary (36° S) in southern New South Wales northwards along the coast and Great Dividing Range to the tip of Cape York Peninsula in north Queensland. Outside Australia it occurs on New Guinea and offshore islands, through eastern Indonesia to Sulawesi in the west and east into the southwestern Pacific, where it is found in New Caledonia, Fiji, Tonga, Samoa and Vanuatu. It had been thought to occur in Western Australia, but these collections have been now referred to Ficus brachypoda. Preferring soils with high nutrient and water content, it occurs on sandstone or latite soils in the Sydney region. The habitat is warm temperate to moist subtropical rainforest. Large specimens can rise above the canopy as emergent trees.

== Ecology ==
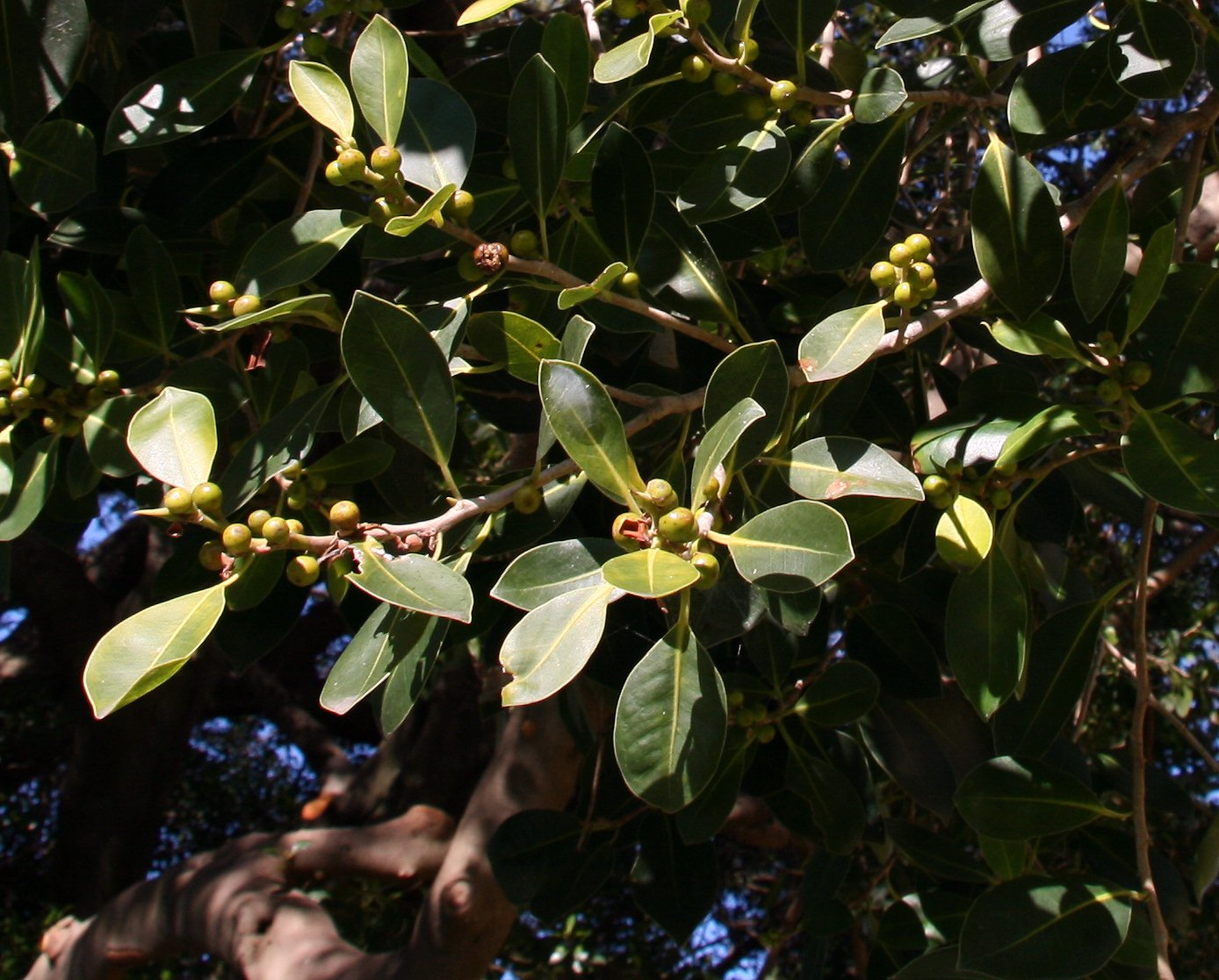
Unripe fruit

The double-eyed fig parrot (Cyclopsitta diophthalma) eats the fruit of Ficus obliqua, steadily depositing fruity detritus on the ground. The rainbow lorikeet (Trichoglossus moluccanus) is another parrot that consumes the fruit and disperses the seeds; other Australian bird species include the southern cassowary (Casuarius casuarius), brown cuckoo-dove (Macropygia phasianella), rose-crowned fruit dove (Ptilinopus regina), wompoo fruit dove (P. magnificus), wonga pigeon (Leucosarcia melanoleuca), topknot pigeon (Lopholaimus antarcticus), silvereye (Zosterops lateralis), pied currawong (Strepera graculina), black-faced cuckoo-shrike (Coracina novaehollandae), olive-backed oriole (Oriolus sagittatus), Australasian figbird (Sphecotheres vieilloti), green catbird (Ailuroedus crassirostris), regent bowerbird (Sericulus chrysocephalus), satin bowerbird (Ptilonorhynchus violaceus), and Lewin's honeyeater (Meliphaga lewinii). The tree is an important food source for the western Polynesian species the many-colored fruit dove (Ptilinopus perousii) and crimson-crowned fruit dove (P. porphyraceus), and has been recommended for amenity planting in Tonga for these birds. The spectacled flying fox (Pteropus conspicillatus) and grey-headed flying fox (Pteropus poliocephalus) also eat the fruit.

Leaves of Ficus obliqua serve as a food source for the larvae of the butterfly species the common crow (Euploea core), the no-brand crow (Euploea alcathoe), and the Geometer moth species Scopula epigypsa. The thrips species Gynaikothrips australis feeds on the underside of new leaves of F. obliqua, as well as F. rubiginosa and F. macrophylla. As plant cells die, nearby cells are induced into forming meristem tissue. A gall results and the leaves become distorted and curl over. The thrips remain in the galls at night and wander about in the daytime before returning in the evening, possibly to different galls about the tree. The thrips begin feeding when the tree has flushes of new growth, and the life cycle is around six weeks. At other times, thrips reside on old leaves without feeding or pupate sheltered in the bark.

=== Reproduction and life span ===
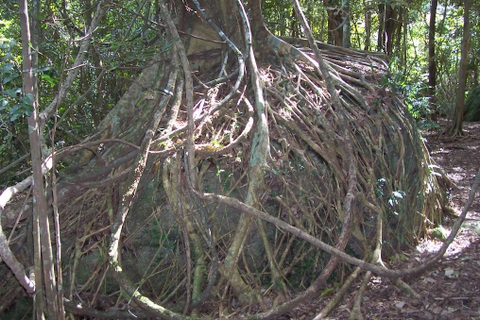
A growing specimen that has begun as a lithophyte and has increasing numbers of roots reaching the ground, Watagan Mountains

Figs have an obligate mutualism with fig wasps (Agaonidae); figs are only pollinated by fig wasps, and fig wasps can only reproduce in fig flowers. Generally, each fig species depends on a single species of wasp for pollination. The wasps are similarly dependent on their fig species to reproduce. The assumption that fig species are usually pollinated by just one species of fig wasp has been challenged by the discovery of cryptic species complexes among what was previously thought to be single species of fig wasps. Ficus obliqua is pollinated by two species of fig wasp—Pleistodontes greenwoodi and P. xanthocephalus.

Female and male flowers in each syconium mature at different times. Female wasps enter the syconium and lay eggs in the female flowers as they mature. These eggs later hatch and the progeny mate. The females of the new generation collect pollen from the male flowers, which have matured by this point, and leave to visit other syconia and repeat the process. A field study in Brisbane found that F. obliqua trees often bore both male and female syconia at the same time—this could be beneficial for reproduction in isolated populations, such as those on islands. The same study found a slightly reduced number of male phase syconia in winter, thought due to increased mortality of the wasp pollinator in cooler months.

The animals that eat the figs disperse the seeds, which then germinate and grow on other plants (epiphytes) or on rocks (lithophytes). As the new plants develop, they send roots to the forest floor. Figs growing on other plants grow larger and larger until they strangle their hosts. Ficus obliqua is long-lived, and trees are thought to live in excess of 500 years.

== Uses ==
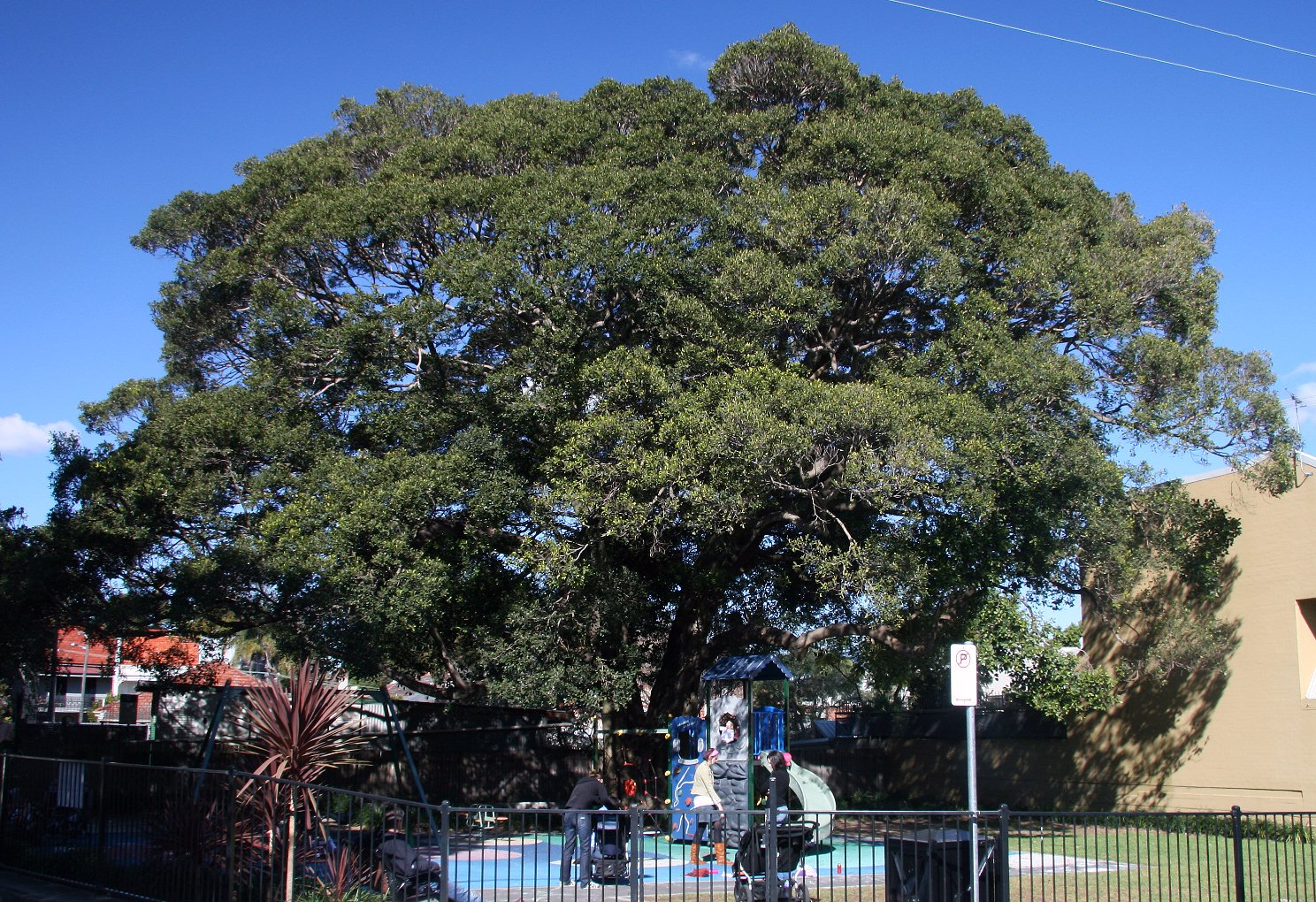
Ficus obliqua planted as a shade tree in a playground, Glebe, New South Wales

Ficus obliqua is an elegant shade tree for parks or fields, and is adaptable to differing soils. A notable specimen in Mick Ryan Park, Milton on the New South Wales south coast stands 14 m (46 ft) tall and 38 m (125 ft) across, and is a local landmark. Like other fig species that grow into large trees, Ficus obliqua is not suitable for any but the largest gardens as its aggressive root system invades drains and garden beds. Fig trees also drop large quantities of fruit and leaves, leaving a mess underfoot. Although it is much less used in bonsai than F. rubiginosa, F. obliqua is well-suited for use in the medium; its small leaves and trunk's propensity to thicken give it attributes optimal for a tree 10–80 cm (3.9–31.5 in) in height. It is seen in bonsai nurseries mainly in the Brisbane area, where it is a locally common species, and is very highly regarded by at least one proponent, Bradley Barlow. Barlow entered a specimen from Brisbane to the Bonsai Clubs International competition in 2006, winning a prize. It is also suited for use as an indoor plant in low-, medium- or brightly lit indoor spaces. The timber is too soft for use in woodworking.

Known as baka or baka ni viti in Fiji, Ficus obliqua has many of its parts used in Fijian traditional medicine, and was previously held to be sacred there. Its white sap has been used for painful or swollen joints and limbs or boils, or diluted with water and drunk to improve breast milk. Liquid extracted from the root bark has been used for headaches or, when diluted, to improve health after childbirth, and the leaves are applied to venereal lesions. The species has been traditionally used for boils in Samoa and Tonga.
