= Shady Run Canyon =

Coordinates: 39.7913044°N 118.2340255°W

Shady Run Canyon is a valley in the U.S. state of Nevada.

Shady Run Canyon was named for the fact it had shade trees.
