= Fraxinus excelsior 'Hessei' =

Ash cultivar

- Genus: Fraxinus
- Species: F. excelsior
- Cultivar: 'Hessei'

Fraxinus excelsior 'Hessei', also known as one-leaved ash or simple-leaved ash, is a cultivar of the Fraxinus excelsior species native to Europe and Western Asia. It is known for being vigorous, seedless, and pest resistant. It is widely cultivated as a shade tree, having lustrous, dark-green foliage.

== Description ==
The "Hessei" Ash tree is deciduous and can grow up to 60 ft (18 m) tall. Its leaves are dark-green and singly-toothed. The tree's flowers are inconspicuously small and bloom from April to May, no seeds are produced.
