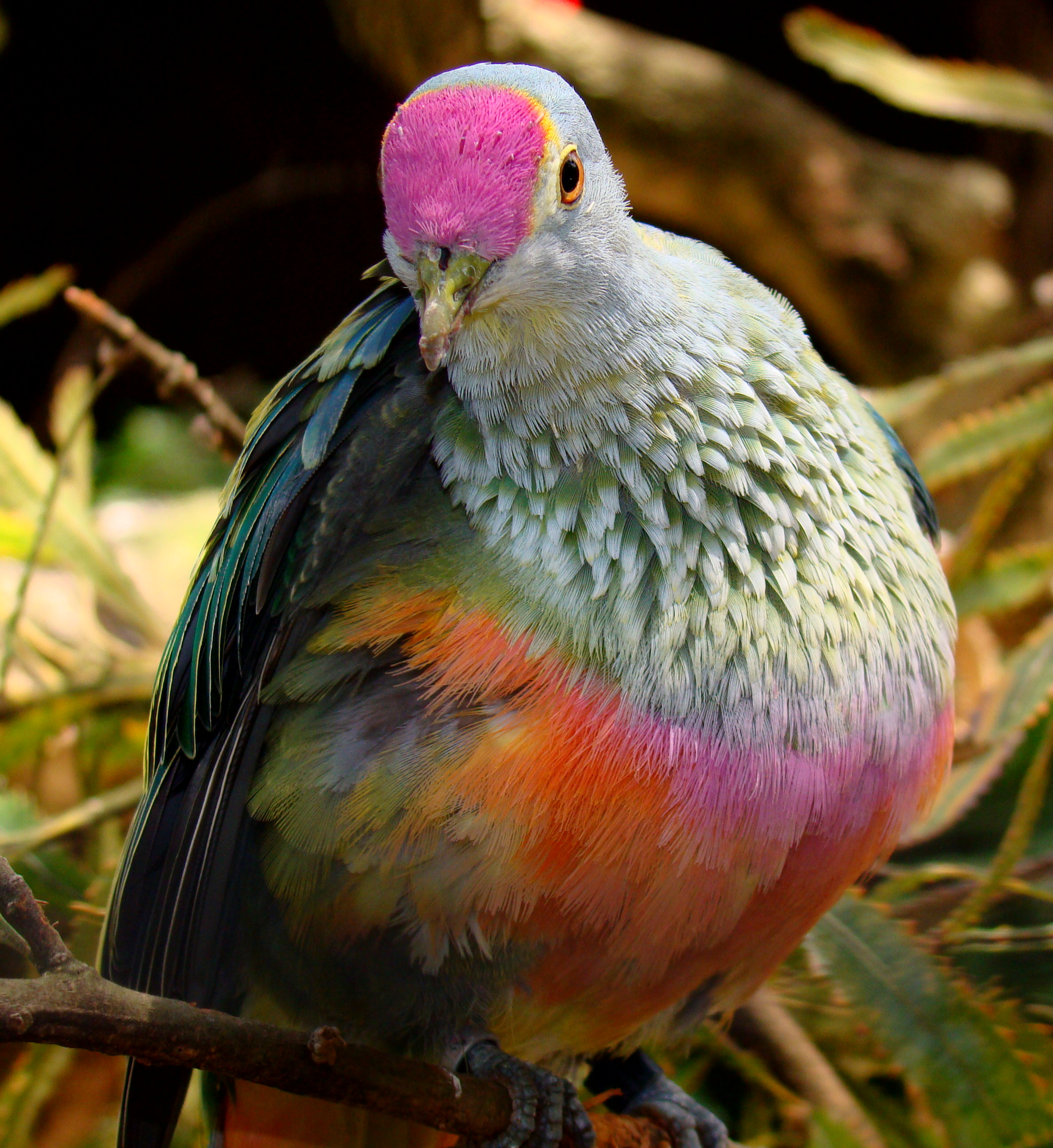

Conservation status
- Least Concern (IUCN 3.1)

Scientific classification
- Kingdom: Animalia
- Phylum: Chordata
- Class: Aves
- Order: Columbiformes
- Family: Columbidae
- Genus: Ptilinopus
- Species: P. regina

Binomial name
- Ptilinopus regina Swainson, 1825

= Rose-crowned fruit dove =

Species of bird

The rose-crowned fruit dove (Ptilinopus regina), also known as pink-capped fruit dove or Swainson's fruit dove, is a medium-sized fruit dove that is found in parts of southern Indonesia, northern and eastern Australia and East Timor.

== Taxonomy ==
The rose-crowned fruit dove was formally described in 1825 by the English naturalist William Swainson. He considered his specimens as a variant of the grey-green fruit dove (Ptilinopus purpuratus) and specified the scientific name as Ptilinopus purpuratus var. Regina. The type locality is New South Wales.

Five subspecies are recognised:

- P. r. flavicollis Bonaparte, 1855 – Flores, Savu, Rote, Semau and west Timor (central Lesser Sunda Islands)
- P. r. roseipileum Hartert, EJO, 1904 – east Timor, Wetar, Romang, Kisar, Leti and Moa (east Lesser Sunda Islands)
- P. r. xanthogaster (Wagler, 1827) – Damar Island, Sermata, Nila, Teun and Babar Islands (far east Lesser Sunda Islands), Banda, Kai and Tanimbar Islands (south Moluccas) and Aru Islands (southwest of New Guinea)
- P. r. ewingii Gould, 1842 – northeast Western Australia to northeast Northern Territory and Melville Island (Tiwi Islands, north of Northern Territory; north Australia)
- P. r. regina Swainson, 1825 – Torres Strait islands, north Cape York Peninsula, northeast Queensland to southeast New South Wales (far northeast to southeast Australia)

== Description ==
The rose-crowned fruit dove is 22 cm (8.7 in) long and has a grey head and breast, an orange belly, whitish throat, yellow-orange iris, and greyish green bill and feet. It has a pinkish-red crown with yellow border. The Indonesian subspecies, P. r. xanthogaster, has a whitish crown and paler grey head and breast. Both sexes are similar. The young has a green-colored crown and plumage.

== Distribution and habitat ==
The rose-crowned fruit dove is distributed in lowland rainforests of northern and eastern Australia, and monsoon forests of northern Australia, Lesser Sunda Islands and Maluku Islands of Indonesia. The diet consists mainly of various fruits, palms and vines. The female usually lays a single white egg.

Widespread and common throughout its large range, the rose-crowned fruit dove is evaluated as Least Concern on the IUCN Red List of Threatened Species.
