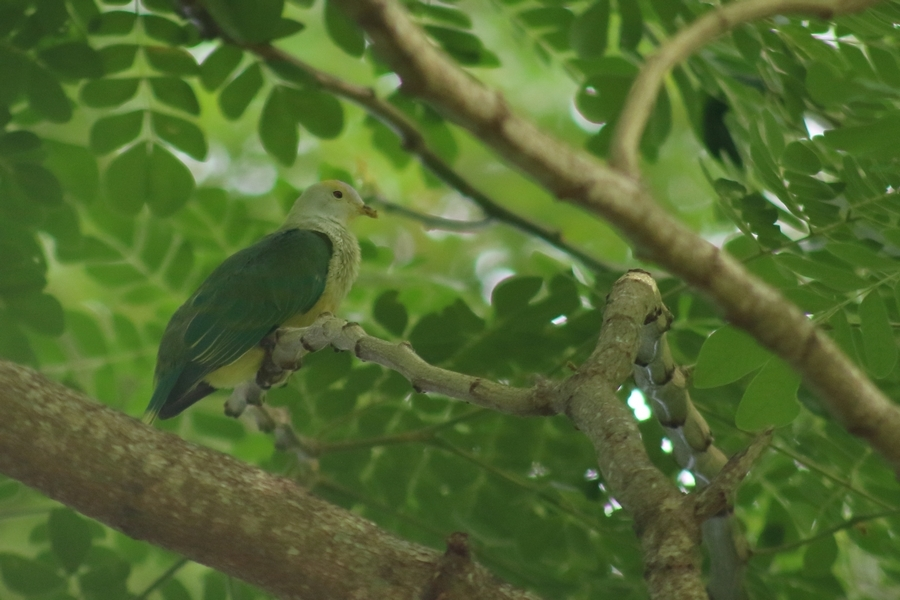

Conservation status
- Endangered (IUCN 3.1)

Scientific classification
- Kingdom: Animalia
- Phylum: Chordata
- Class: Aves
- Order: Columbiformes
- Family: Columbidae
- Genus: Ptilinopus
- Species: P. chrysogaster

Binomial name
- Ptilinopus chrysogaster Gray, GR, 1854

Synonyms
- Ptilinopus purpuratus chrysogaster

= Raiatea fruit dove =

Raiatea fruit-dove

Subspecies of bird

The Raiatea fruit dove (Ptilinopus chrysogaster) is a species of bird in the family Columbidae. It is endemic to the Society Islands in French Polynesia. Although first named to science in 1853, this fruit dove was evidently discovered 30 years earlier, by René Primevère Lesson (1794–1849), while serving as naturalist aboard La Coquille. It was formerly considered a subspecies of the grey-green fruit dove but was split as a distinct species by the IOC in 2021. Its natural habitat is tropical moist lowland forests.

== Distribution and population ==
The Raiatea fruit dove is endemic to the French Polynesian islands Huahine, Raiatea, Tahaa, Bora Bora, and, at least formerly, Maupiti. There is an estimated population of 1000 to 2500 mature individual birds. Better population estimates after 2001 are unknown.

== Threats ==
There is an ongoing population decline due to habitat destruction; the introduction of non-native plants, predation by invasive species such as the swamp harrier (Circus approximans) and feral cats, Polynesian rats (Rattus exulans), black rats (R. rattus) have a negative impact on the quality of the species habitat.
