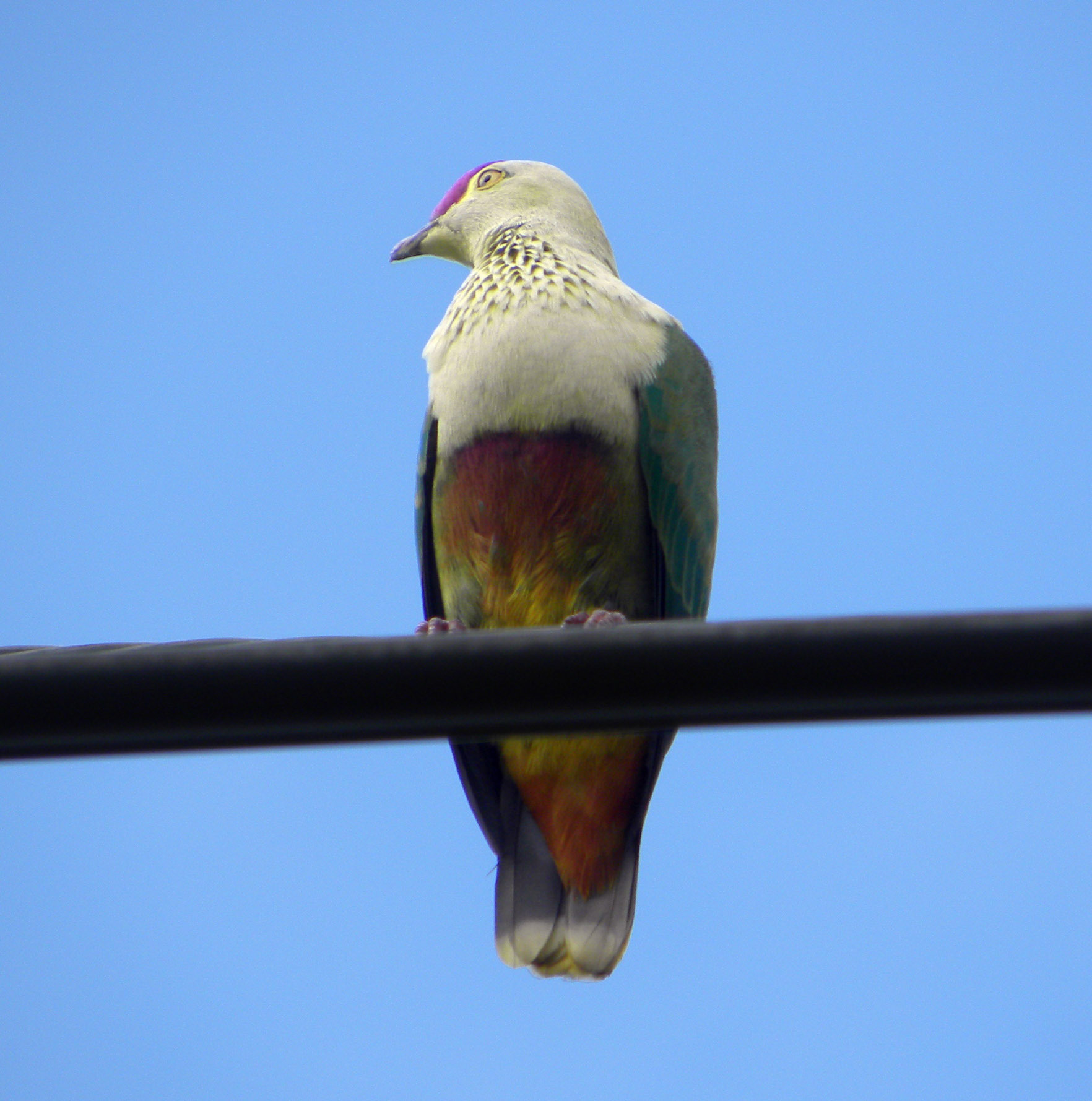

Conservation status
- Least Concern (IUCN 3.1)

Scientific classification
- Kingdom: Animalia
- Phylum: Chordata
- Class: Aves
- Order: Columbiformes
- Family: Columbidae
- Genus: Ptilinopus
- Species: P. porphyraceus

Binomial name
- Ptilinopus porphyraceus (Temminck, 1821)

Subspecies
- See text

= Crimson-crowned fruit dove =

Species of bird

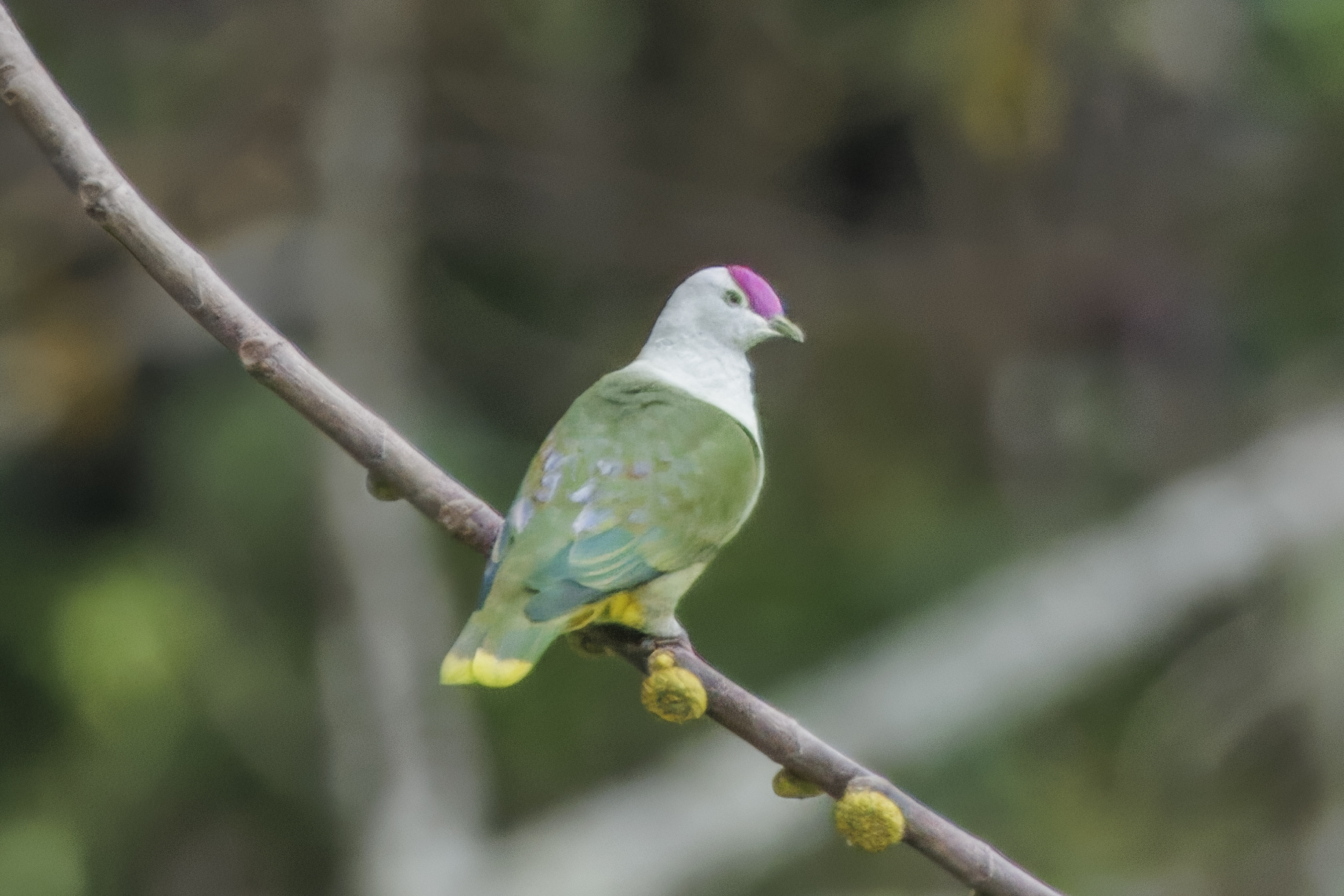
P. p. fasciatus, Samoa

The crimson-crowned fruit dove, also the Tongan fruit dove or purple-capped fruit dove (Ptilinopus porphyraceus), is a species of bird in the family Columbidae. In the Samoan language, it is known as the manutagi. In Tonga and Niue, it is known as the kulukulu.

It is found in American Samoa, Fiji, the Marshall Islands, Niue, Samoa, Tonga, and Wallis and Futuna. Its natural habitats are subtropical or tropical moist lowland forest and subtropical or tropical mangrove forest.

The diet of Ptilinopus porphyraceus is mostly fruit, including figs, Meliaceae, Muntingia, Solanum torvum, Metroxylon amicarum, and ylang ylang.

It is typically solitary, and sometimes seen in pairs; it is believed to be territorial. However, on rare occasions, it has been seen in groups of up to 10.

== Description ==
The crimson-crowned fruit dove (Ptilinopus porphyraceus) is a small dove in the genus Ptilinopus, about 23 cm (9 in) in length.

Its plumage is two-toned green, with a distinctive purple-crimson cap and pale greenish-gray head, neck, breast, and upper back. A dusky patch marks the area between the breast and belly, while the undertail-coverts are orange-yellow. The tail ends in a pale band, which is gray in birds from Fiji and Tonga. There is limited demonstration of sexual dimorphism in this species, as males and females have similar plumage. However, the species demonstrates ontogenetic variation, as juveniles are bright green with yellow edges on their feathers.

== Distribution and habitat ==
The distribution of this species extends across islands in Fiji, Tonga, Niue, and the Samoan Islands. Its populations occur on separate islands and island groups throughout the southwestern Pacific, rather than inhabiting a continuous geographic range. The species is associated with the biogeographic region of western Polynesia, which includes Fiji, Tonga, and Samoa. However, its precise distribution depends partly on which taxonomic classification is followed.

The crimson-crowned fruit dove inhabits tropical island environments, particularly forested areas that supply fruit and suitable trees for feeding and shelter. Studies have documented it in mature native forest, secondary forest, regenerating woodland, bush clearings, and some agricultural landscapes. Although the species can occupy disturbed environments, research indicates that mature or relatively undisturbed forest often supports greater numbers of birds.

=== Ptilinopus p. porphyraceus ===
The nominate subspecies, P. p. porphyraceus, occurs in Fiji, Tonga, and Niue. In Tonga, researchers documented the species throughout the Vava'u island group, where it occurred on all 16 islands surveyed or was considered likely to occur there. The birds were common and widespread across this group, demonstrating that they can persist on numerous islands of different sizes. In Niue, field observations described the dove as common in forests and bush clearings, although observers heard it more frequently than they saw it.

Another population has been reported from Rotuma, a remote island that is politically part of Fiji but that is geographically isolated from the rest of the Fijian archipelago. In 1991 and 2018, researches documented the crimson-crowned fruit dove there during surveys of the island. In 1991, observers encountered the birds mainly in more mature vegetation on the island's higher hills. By 2018, they recorded them across a broader range of environments, including coastal areas, farmland, village outskirts, and secondary forest. The authors of this 2019 report estimated a local population of 500–1,000 birds in 2018, although the records alone do not establish the cause of the apparent change in distribution.

=== Ptilinopus p. fasciatus ===
The subspecies P. p. fasciatus is associated with Samoa and the wider Samoan Islands, including American Samoa under classifications that retain P. p. fasciatus as a subspecies. The distinction between this form and the nominate subspecies has not been accepted uniformly by ornithologists. Some taxonomic authorities recognize P. fasciatus as a separate species altogether, the Samoan fruit dove, rather than considering P. p. fasciatus as a subspecies of P. porphyraceus.

== Behavior and ecology ==
=== Diet ===
The crimson-crowned fruit dove is a frugivore, feeding primarily on fruit in forest canopies. In Tonga, the birds gather at fruiting trees, particularly figs, although they maintain separate breeding territories.

On Rotuma, researchers observed the doves feeding on fruits of ylang-ylang (Cananga odorata) and figs. They also recorded the birds feeding on flowers of the ivory nut palm (Metroxylon warburgii), demonstrating that their diet includes plant material beyond fruit.

=== Social ===
Crimson-crowned fruit doves are often detected by their calls rather than by sight. In Tonga's Vavaʻu island group, their distinctive calls can be heard throughout the day and often at night. The birds call from the forest canopy or from high, isolated trees. Although they congregate at fruiting trees, they maintain separate breeding territories.

== Taxonomy ==
Older ornithological works used Ptilinopus porphyraceus for a broader group of Pacific island populations. The 2014 HBW and BirdLife International Illustrated Checklist treated several formerly included forms, including the Samoan fruit dove (Ptilinopus fasciatus), as separate species. Because of this, geographic plumage differences reported in older literature should not automatically be attributed to P. porphyraceus under every modern classification.

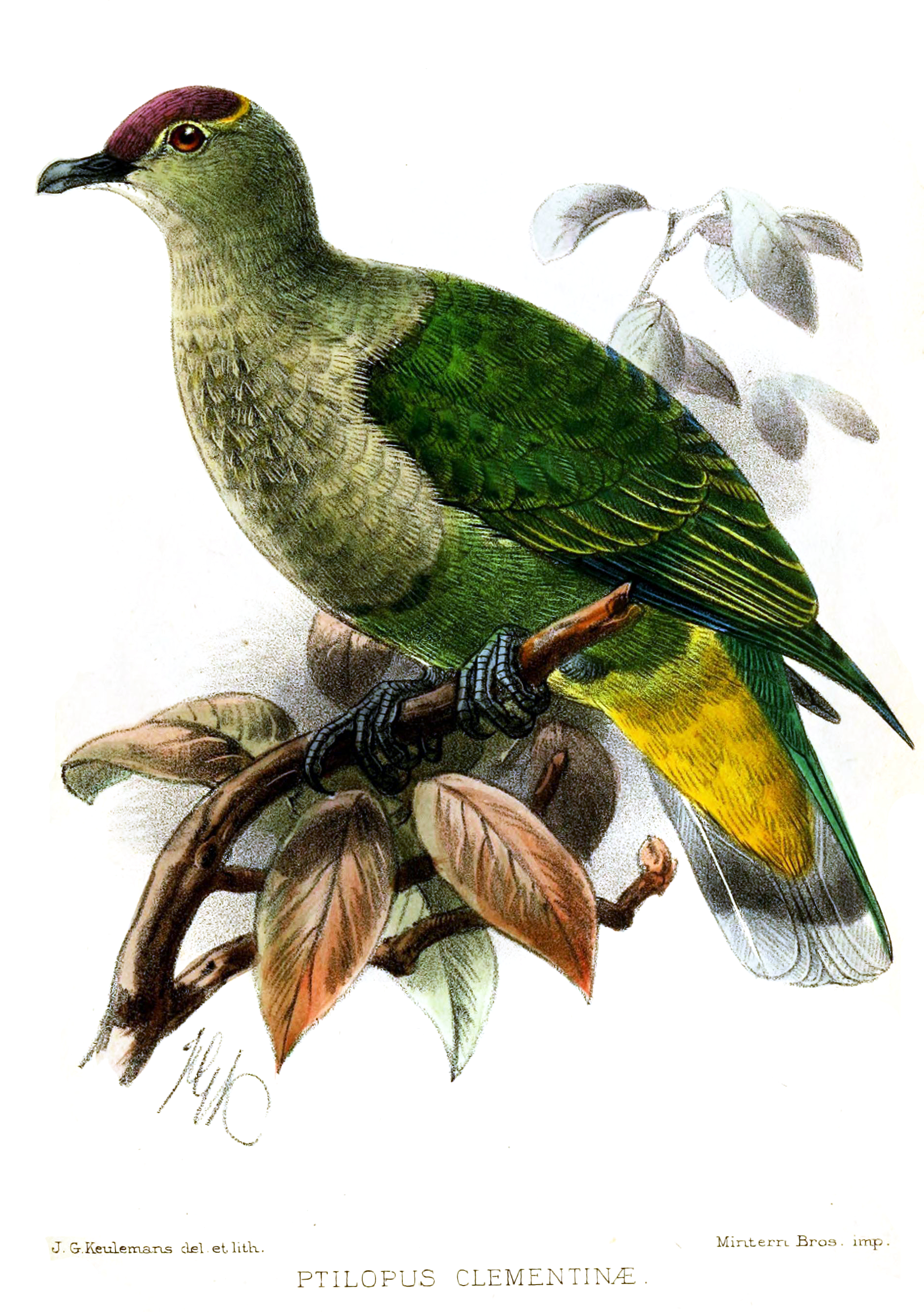
Ptilinopus porphyraceus (listed as Ptilinopus clementinae) in an 1891 illustration by John Gerrard Keulemans

=== Etymology ===
The English name for this species is literal, and is derived from the purple-crimson plumage on the bird's head.

The name for the bird in the Samoan language is manutagi, and is a compound of the words manu, meaning "bird", and tagi, meaning “to cry,” “to call,” or “to lament.” In all, the Samoan name for the bird calls it a "crying bird".

The name for the bird for people in Niue and Tonga is kulukulu. This word is likely an onomatopoeia, as the name given to the bird phonetically mimics the sound that the bird makes.

The scientific name of the bird is largely derived from Greek; porphyraceus means “purple-colored” or “purplish", which comes from the ancient Greek word porphyra (πορφύρα), meaning “purple dye” or “purple cloth,” and is also related to the Greek adjective porphyreos, meaning “purple-colored.”

=== Subspecies ===
Until 2016, both the purple-capped fruit dove and the Kosrae fruit dove were considered subspecies of the crimson-crowned fruit dove. The crimson-crowned fruit dove has two remaining subspecies:

- P. p. porphyraceus – (Temminck, 1821): Found in Niue, Tonga and Fiji
- P. p. fasciatus – Peale, 1848: Found in Samoa

== Description to Western Science ==
The crimson-crowned fruit dove (Ptilinopus porphyraceus) entered Western ornithological literature under older names before naturalists established its current scientific name. During the late eighteenth century, European expeditions visited islands across the southwestern Pacific, including Tonga, where the type specimen of the species is believed to have been collected from. Captain James Cook's second and third voyages visited Tonga in 1773 and 1777. Birds collected during these expeditions entered European natural history collections, and these collections would be referenced by later naturalists, such as John Latham, as they catalogued species and attributed scientific names to them. However, surviving records do not identify every early specimen to a modern species, making it difficult to establish exactly when Europeans first encountered Ptilinopus porphyraceus specifically.

Illustration of Ptilinopus porphyraceus (then classified as the Kurukuru variety of Colomba purpata) by Madame Knip, published as Plate No. 35 in her 1811 collaboration with Coenraad Jacob Temminck, Les Pigeons

In 1783, English naturalist and ornithologist John Latham described a bird called the “Purple-Crowned Pigeon” in his A General Synopsis of Birds. Latham based his description on a specimen from Tahiti, but also discussed similar birds from Tongatapu, noting that their crowns had a deeper, brighter purple color and thus might be a separate species of bird. He recorded that the local people referred to the Tongatapu birds with the name kulukulu, but grouped these birds under the older scientific name Columba purpurata regardless, though it is now believed that the bird from Tongatapu that he was referencing was likely the crimson-crowned fruit dove. Later Western ornithologists recognized that historical descriptions sometimes combined closely related fruit doves from different islands.

Before the current scientific name appeared, the bird also featured in Les Pigeons, an 1811 illustrated work by French artist Madame Knip, with accompanying text by Dutch zoologist Coenraad Jacob Temminck. Plate No. 35 depicts a 'kurukuru' variety of what was then considered Columba purpurata. It is believed that 'kurukuru' is likely an alternate spelling of the name that the people of Tonga and Niue gave to this bird; kulukulu.

At this stage, the differences between this regional variety (what is now understood to be the crimson-crowned fruit dove) and the more generalized Columba purpurata were noted as Temminck discussed differences between the two varieties of pigeons and considered whether variations in their appearance might result from differences in sex, age, or the islands they inhabited.

In 1821, Temminck formally described the taxon as a species separate to Columba purpurata, under the new scientific name Columba porphyracea in the Transactions of the Linnean Society of London. Later taxonomists transferred the species to the genus Ptilinopus, producing its current name, Ptilinopus porphyraceus. Temminck’s 1821 publication is credited with the first entry of the scientific name for this species.

A 2023 catalogue of bird type specimens at Naturalis Biodiversity Center in the Netherlands identifies an adult male, catalogued as RMNH.AVES.213951, as a syntype of Temminck’s Columba porphyracea. The catalogue records its locality as Tongatapu, and connects the specimen’s history to the voyages of British surgeon and collector George Bass, who visited Tonga in September or October 1802. Research suggests that Bass collected Pacific bird specimens that subsequently reached France with the Baudin expedition. However, researchers have cautioned that the origins of some early Pacific bird specimens remain uncertain because their original labels and collection records are missing. The specimen provides an important link between Temminck’s scientific description and Tonga, although its precise collecting history should be treated with care.

== Indigenous Names and Traditional Uses ==
People in the Samoan islands refer to this bird as manutagi, which means "lamenting bird" or "crying bird". In 1873, missionary and naturalist Samuel James Whitmee reported that Samoans commonly kept this bird in captivity. He described how hunters carried a manutagi into the woods in an open-topped wicker cage. The dove's calls attracted other birds, including the lupe, which entered the cage and were captured to be eaten later.

Hunting of the manutagi continued into modern times in American Samoa. A survey of hunters on Tutuila in 1990–1991 estimated an annual harvest of approximately 500 manutagi after accounting for an unusually large, opportunistic harvest following a hurricane in 1990. The survey described bird hunting as a source of food and recreation, but these figures document twentieth-century use rather than pre-contact hunting levels. The crimson-crowned fruit dove, like the related many-colored fruit dove, may have had special spiritual connotations that made consuming or harming the bird taboo for the pre-contact Samoans, but direct documentation of the manutagi (as opposed to the manumā) in this context is lacking.

In Tonga and Niue, ornithological studies record the local name kulukulu for the crimson-crowned fruit dove. Research on Niue found that people did not usually hunt the species at the time of a 2004 survey. However, after Cyclone Heta damaged the island's forests, some kulukulu entered villages in search of food and water, where they became vulnerable to hunting by people and predation by other animals.

== Cultural Significance ==
In the Samoan myth known as Sina and the Birds, the manutagi appears as one of the birds that the mythological figure Sina interacts with.

== Status ==
As of 2026, this species is classified as "least concern" by the IUCN Red List.
