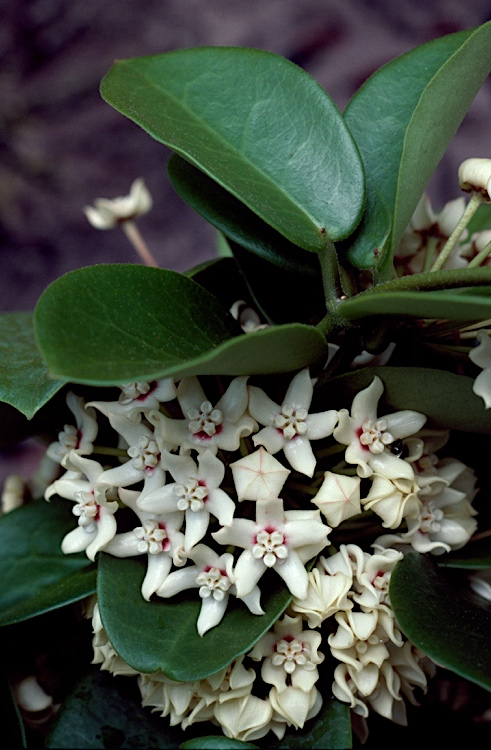
- Subspecies australis in the ANBG

Scientific classification
- Kingdom: Plantae
- Clade: Tracheophytes
- Clade: Angiosperms
- Clade: Eudicots
- Clade: Asterids
- Order: Gentianales
- Family: Apocynaceae
- Genus: Hoya
- Species: H. australis

Binomial name
- Hoya australis R.Br. ex J. Traill

= Hoya australis =

Species of plant

Hoya australis, commonly known as waxflower or common hoya, is a species of flowering plant in the Apocynaceae or dogbane family and is native to northern and eastern Australia, Papuasia and Melanesia. It is a succulent vine or subshrub with fleshy or leathery, elliptic, oblong, egg-shaped or more or less round leaves, racemes of fleshy, cream-coloured and red flowers, and spindle-shaped follicles. It is a popular garden plant, noted for its fragrant flowers.

== Description ==
Hoya australis is a succulent climbing vine to subshrub that typically reaches a height of 4–10 m (13–33 ft). It has fleshy or leathery, elliptic, oblong, egg-shaped or more or less round leaves up to 150 mm (5.9 in) long and 120 mm (4.7 in) wide. Leaves growing in sunnier positions are a more yellowish green while those in shadier situations are dark green in colour. The flowers are arranged in racemes 10–25 mm (0.39–0.98 in) in diameter, each flower 3–5 mm (0.12–0.20 in) long on a pedicel 20–40 mm (0.79–1.57 in) long. The flowers are fleshy, bell-shaped to wheel-shaped, cream-coloured with red under the corona, with egg-shaped lobes, 4–8 mm (0.16–0.31 in) long and 4–6 mm (0.16–0.24 in) wide. The flowers have a strong sweet scent and produce abundant nectar. The corona lobes are oval, cream-coloured, 1.2–3.5 mm (0.047–0.138 in) long and 1.0–2.5 mm (0.039–0.098 in) wide. Flowering time depends on subspecies, and the fruit is a spindle-shaped follicle 90–130 mm (3.5–5.1 in) long.

== Taxonomy ==
Hoya australis was first formally described in 1828 by James Traill from an unpublished description by Robert Brown. The specific epithet (australis) is Latin for "southern".

=== Subspecies ===
In 1988, Ken Hill described subspecies australis and subsp. sanae in the journal Telopea, and in 1991, Paul Irwin Forster and David Liddle described subsp. oramicola, subsp. rupicola and subsp. tenuipes, in the journal Austrobaileya, and the names are accepted by the Australian Plant Census:

- Hoya australis R.Br. ex J.Traill subsp. australis is a twining plant has leaves that are fleshy or succulent, sparse or densely hairy and not curved under, and has extrafloral nectaries. It flowers from March to July.
- Hoya australis P.I.Forst. & Liddle subsp. oramicola has leaves more than 50 mm (2.0 in) long, with obscure veins and the edges strongly rolled under. It flowers in July.
- Hoya australis (K.D.Hill) P.I.Forst. & Liddle subsp. rupicola is similar to subsp. australis, but is an erect plant that does not twine, has leaves that are succulent and not curved under, and lacks extrafloral nectaries. It flowers from January to March.
- Hoya australis subsp. sanae (F.M.Bailey) K.D.Hill previously known as Hoya sanae F.M.Bailey has leaves less than 50 mm (2.0 in) long, with prominent veins and the edges strongly rolled under. It flowers from May to June.
- Hoya australis subsp. tenuipes (K.D.Hill) P.I.Forst. & Liddle is a twining plant has leaves that are leathery, glabrous or sparsely hairy and not curved under, and has extrafloral nectaries. In Australia, this subspecies mainly flowers in September and October.

== Distribution and habitat ==
This species of Hoya is endemic to Australia, and is found in Western Australia, the Northern Territory, Queensland and New South Wales.

Subspecies australis occurs in eastern Australia from the Torres Strait in northern Queensland to Dorrigo in New South Wales. Subspecies oramicola is restricted to Melville and Bathurst Islands north of Darwin, subsp. rupicola occurs in the Kimberley region of Western Australia and the Top End of the Northern Territory on sandstone outcrops and cliffs. subsp. sanae grows in foreshore vine thickets on Cape York Peninsula and some offshore islands and subsp. tenuipes is found on the southern Cape York Peninsula, as far south as Innisfail, and in New Guinea, the Solomon Islands and Melanesia.

== Ecology ==
It serves as a food plant for the caterpillars of the Queensland butterfly the no-brand crow (Euploea alcathoe), and the common Australian crow (E. core). Flowers are pollinated by the southern grass-dart (Ocybadistes walkeri).

The plant is poisonous to livestock such as sheep.

== Use in horticulture ==
Hoya australis is a popular garden and houseplant in Australia, where it flowers best in a well-lit position. It is often grown in containers and trained to grow on trellises on verandahs, fences and in glasshouses. It is a butterfly-attracting plant in the garden. It can be grown indoors provided it receives direct sunlight.
