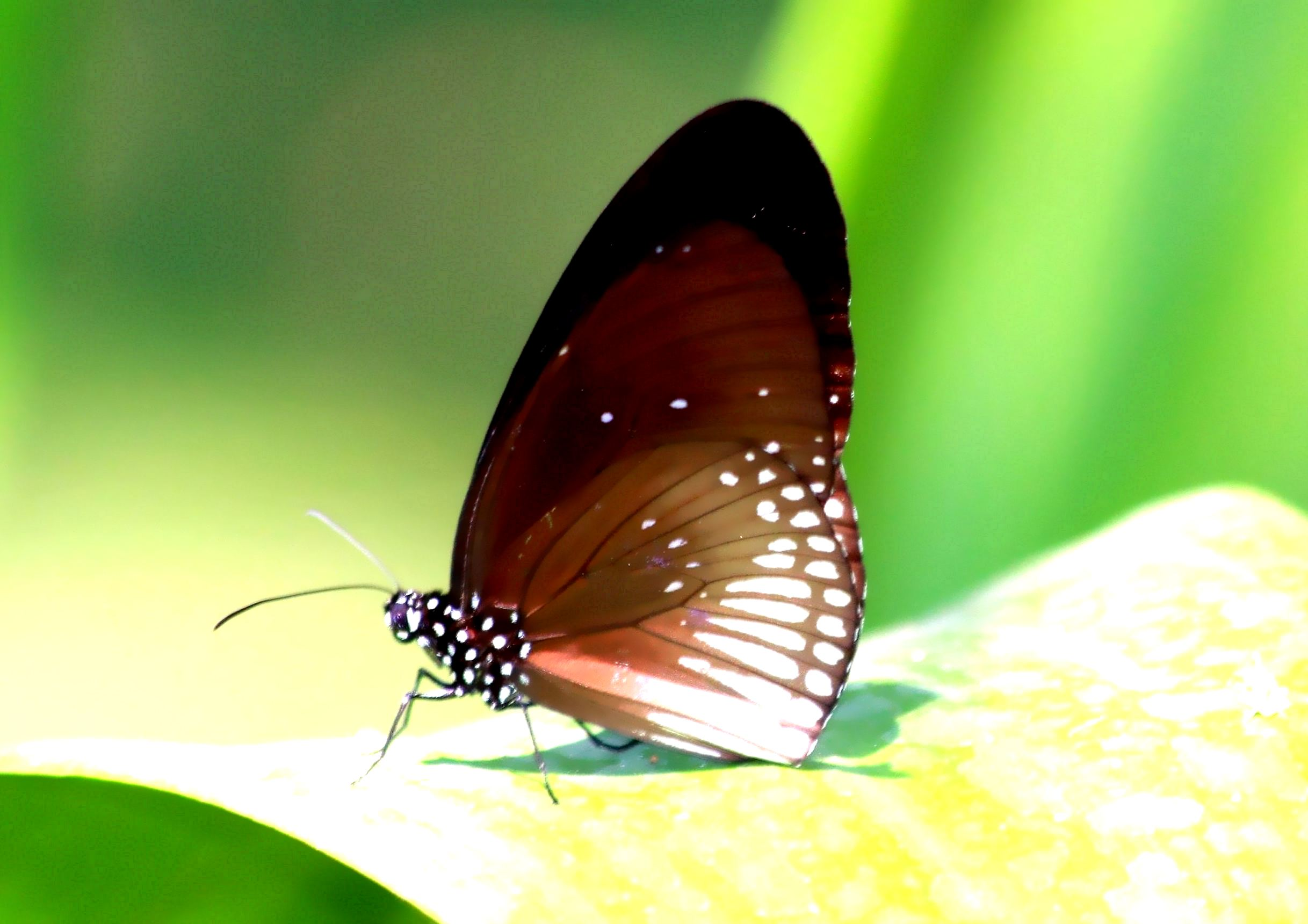
- Male
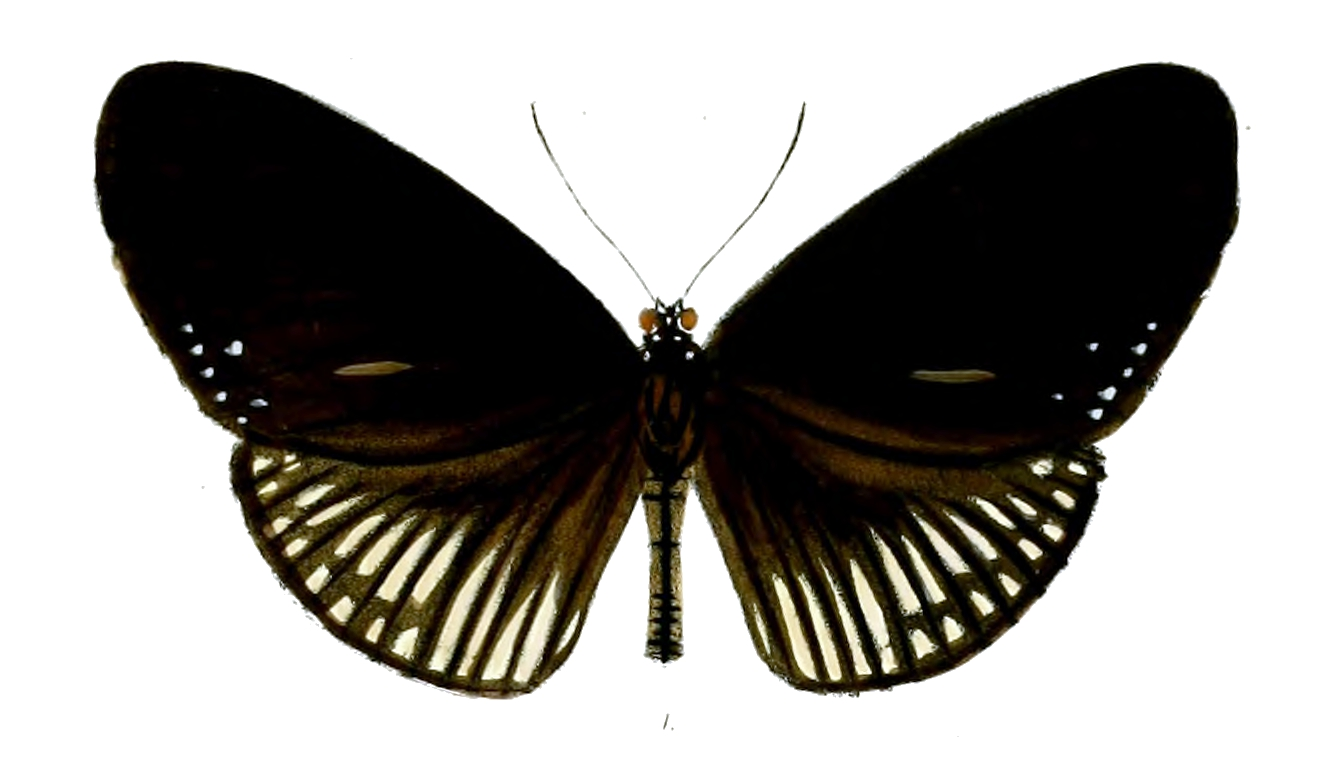

Scientific classification
- Kingdom: Animalia
- Phylum: Arthropoda
- Clade: Pancrustacea
- Class: Insecta
- Order: Lepidoptera
- Family: Nymphalidae
- Genus: Euploea
- Species: E. alcathoe

Binomial name
- Euploea alcathoe (Godart, [1819])

Synonyms
- Danais alcathoe Godart, [1819]; Euploea enastri Fenner, 1991; Stictoploea aethiopina Grose-Smith, 1894; Euploea aethiops Butler, 1866; Euploea boreas Miskin, 1890; Euploea alecto barsine Fruhstorfer, 1904; Euploea barea Fruhstorfer, 1911; Euploea faesula Fruhstorfer, 1910; Euploea fidena Fruhstorfer, 1915; Euploea harrisii Moore, 1883; Euploea latreillei Kirsch, 1877; Euploea lygdania Fruhstorfer, 1910; Euploea melancholica Butler, 1866; Gamatoba melinda Grose-Smith, 1894; Euploea monaeses Fruhstorfer, 1910; Euploea nymphas Fruhstorfer, 1910; Euploea occulta Butler, 1877; Euploea pheres Fruhstorfer, 1910; Euploea reaumuri Oberthür, 1878; Euploea rotschildiana Hulstaert, 1923; Euploea tamis Fruhstorfer, 1910; Euploea eichhorni Staudinger, 1884; Euploea alecto Butler, 1866; Euploea pierretii C. & R. Felder, [1865]; Gamatoba monilifera Moore, 1883; Euploea misenus Miskin, 1890

= Euploea alcathoe =

No-brand crow

Species of butterfly

Euploea alcathoe, commonly known as the no-brand crow, Eichhorn's crow or striped black crow, is a common butterfly found from India to Borneo, and in the Moluccas, New Guinea and Australia. It belongs to the crows and tigers subfamily of the Nymphalidae (brushfooted butterflies).

The butterflies keep to within 3 metres (9.8 ft) of the ground and they can be found in patches of sun underneath the forest canopy where they alight on understory leaves and small twigs.

The larvae feed on Nerium indicum, Nerium oleander, Mandevilla, Asclepias, Hoya australis, Marsdenia australis, Ficus platypoda, Gymnanthera oblonga and Ficus obliqua in Australia. The larvae of the endangered Gove subspecies, Euploea alcathoe enastri, also feed on the vines of Parsonsia alboflavescens, and Vincetoxicum polyanthum (syn. Tylophora benthamii). Euploea alcathoe adults are most common in the monsoonal wet season between December and May in Australia, and there may be several generations over the course of a year.

== Subspecies ==
- Euploea alcathoe alcathoe
- Euploea alcathoe eichhorni Staudinger, 1884 (Cape York to Ingham)
- Euploea alcathoe enastri (Gove Peninsula)
- Euploea alcathoe alecto Butler, 1866 (Buru, Ambon, Serang)
- Euploea alcathoe zodica Fruhstorfer, 1904 (Obi)
- Euploea alcathoe pierretii C. & R. Felder, [1865] (West Irian)
- Euploea alcathoe macgregori Kirby, 1889 (D'Entrecasteaux Islands)
- Euploea alcathoe diadema Moore, 1883 (Papua, Goodenough)
- Euploea alcathoe coffea Fruhstorfer, 1910 (eastern New Guinea, Karkar Island)
- Euploea alcathoe samaraina Carpenter, 1953 (south-eastern Papua New Guinea: Samarai Island)
- Euploea alcathoe monilifera (Moore, 1883) (Cape York, Thursday Island)

== Conservation ==
The subspecies enastri of the Gove Peninsula is classified as endangered. Males have been collected from glades in rainforest and females from adjacent paperbark swampland. It is threatened by habitat destruction and degradation by water buffalo and feral pigs, and by invasion of its environment by the yellow crazy ant (Anoplolepis gracilipes).
