= Scopula epigypsa =

Scientific classification
- Domain: Eukaryota
- Kingdom: Animalia
- Phylum: Arthropoda
- Class: Insecta
- Order: Lepidoptera
- Family: Geometridae
- Genus: Scopula
- Species: S. epigypsa

Binomial name
- Scopula epigypsa (Meyrick, 1886)

Synonyms
- Trichoclada epigypsa Meyrick, 1886; Acidalia cernea Druce, 1888; Idaea nivipennis Butler, 1886

Species of geometer moth in subfamily Sterrhinae

Scopula epigypsa is a moth of the family Geometridae. It was described by Edward Meyrick in 1886. It is endemic to Fiji.

The larvae feed on Ficus obliqua.
