= Shade tree =

Tree grown specifically for its shade

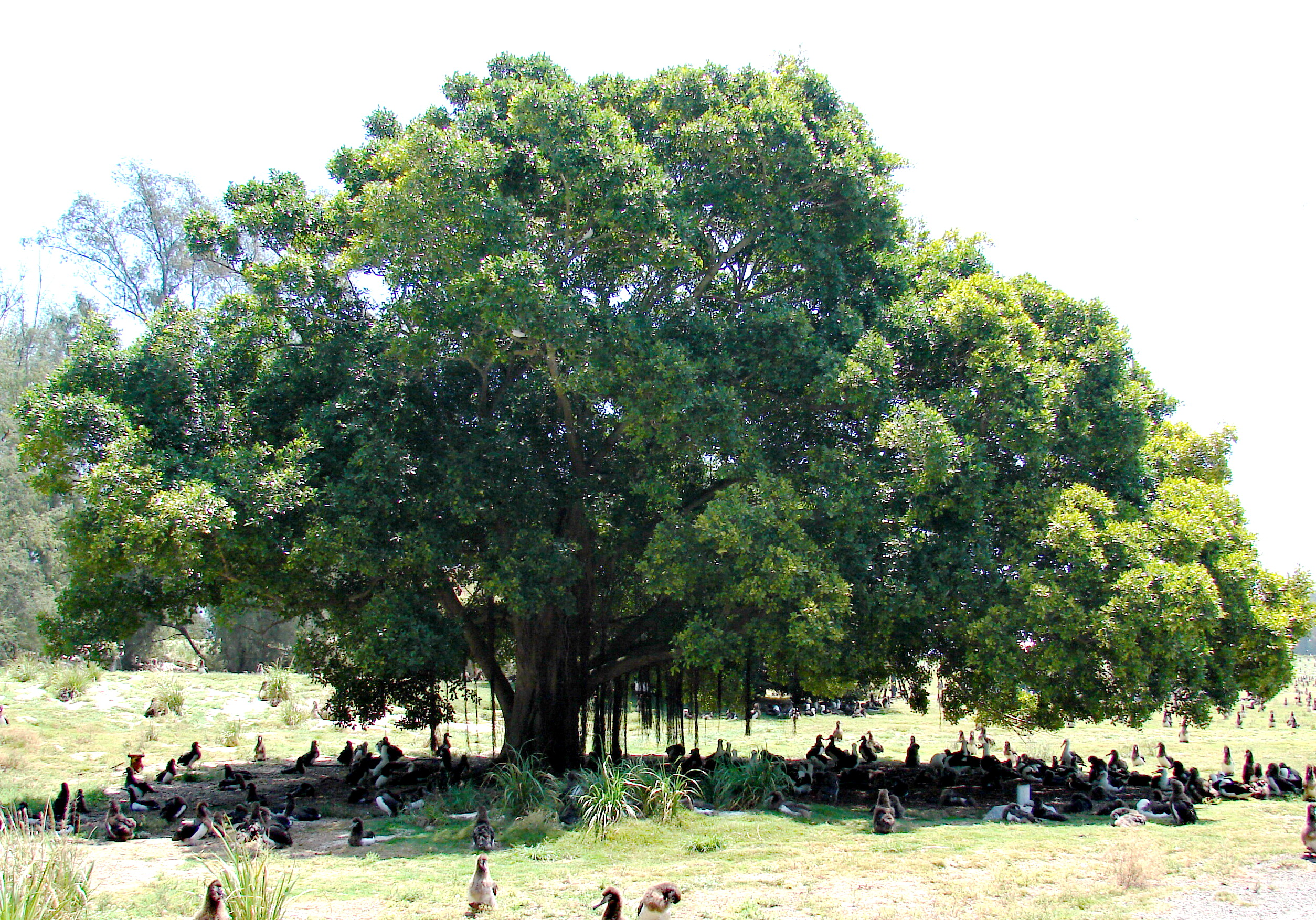
A group of Laysan albatrosses resting beneath the canopy of a fig, a common shade tree in many parts of the world.

A shade tree is a large tree whose primary role is to provide shade in the surrounding environment due to its spreading canopy and crown, where it may give shelter from sunlight in the heat of the summer for people who seek recreational needs in urban parks and house yards, and thus, also protecting them from the sun's harmful ultraviolet rays.

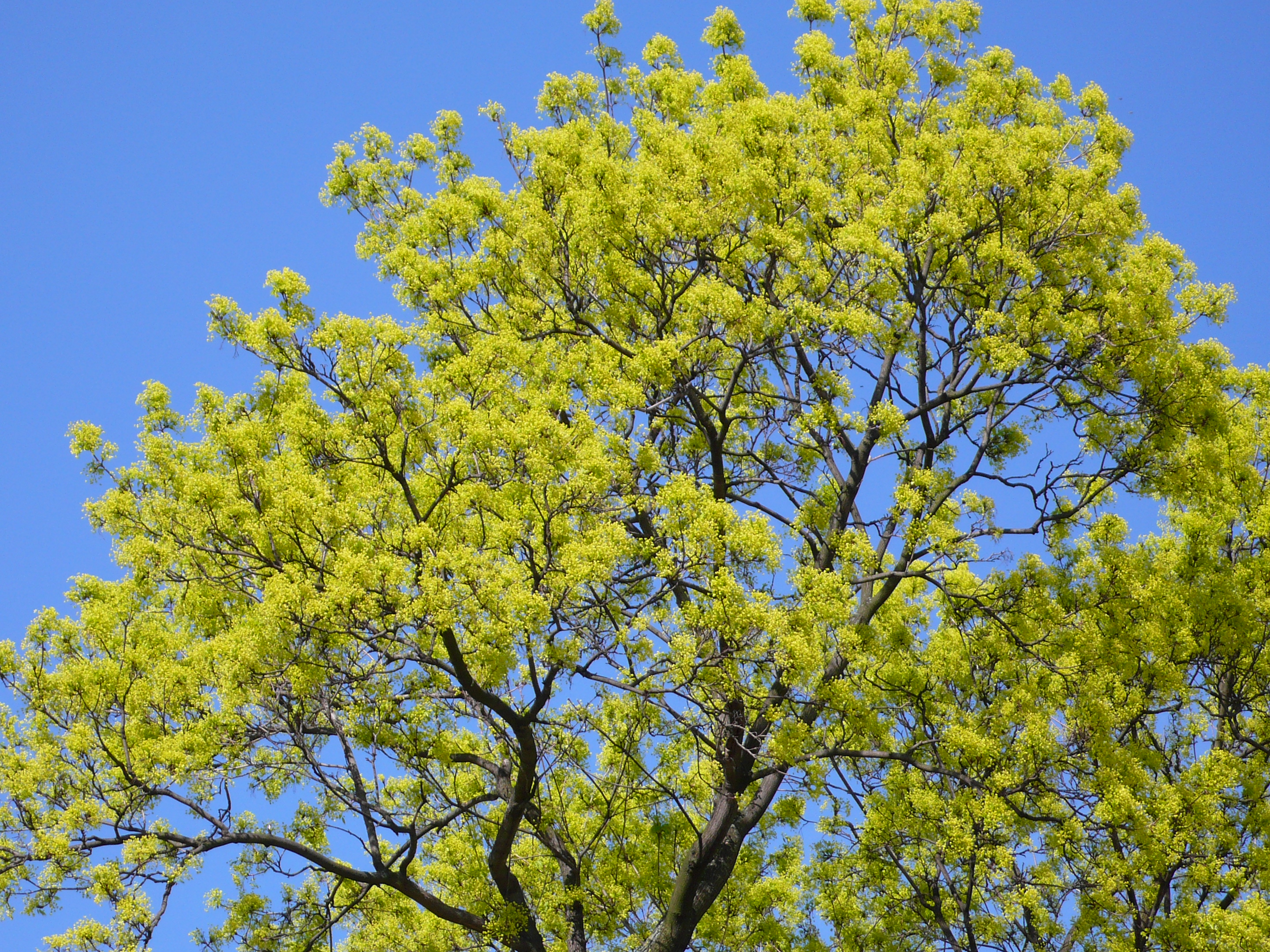
Native across Europe and into Western Asia, the Norway maple is a popular shade tree, resulting in it becoming naturalised as an introduced species in North America.

Some of the most popular shade trees in temperate countries are oaks, plane trees, willows, birches, beeches, maples, ashes, lindens, and elms. In subtropical countries like Australia and India, figs are popular choices as shade trees. In tropical countries, trees such as some Erythrina and African tulip tree species are often planted as shade trees.

== Specialities ==
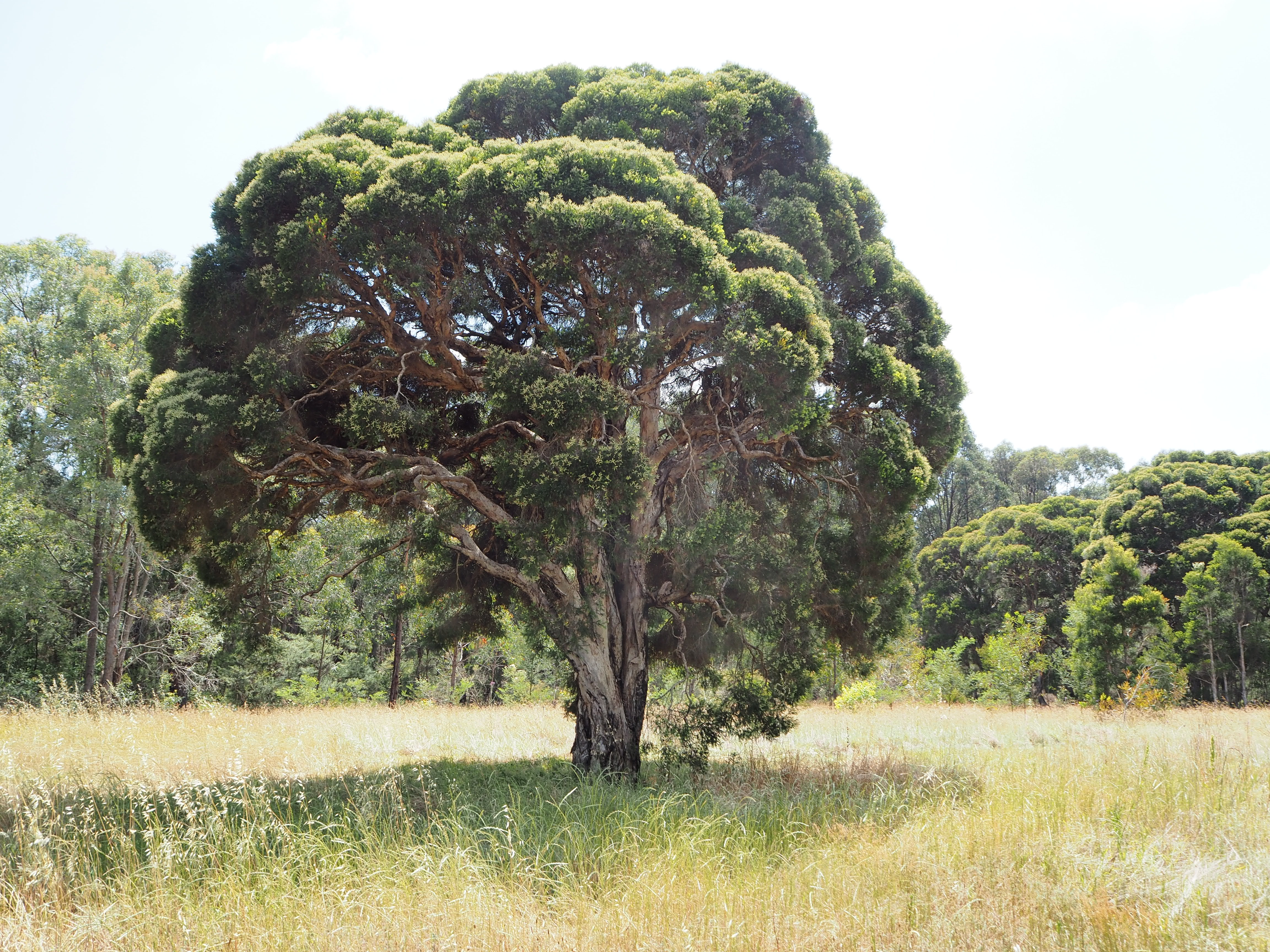
Paperbark trees have a large canopy, supplying adequate shade.

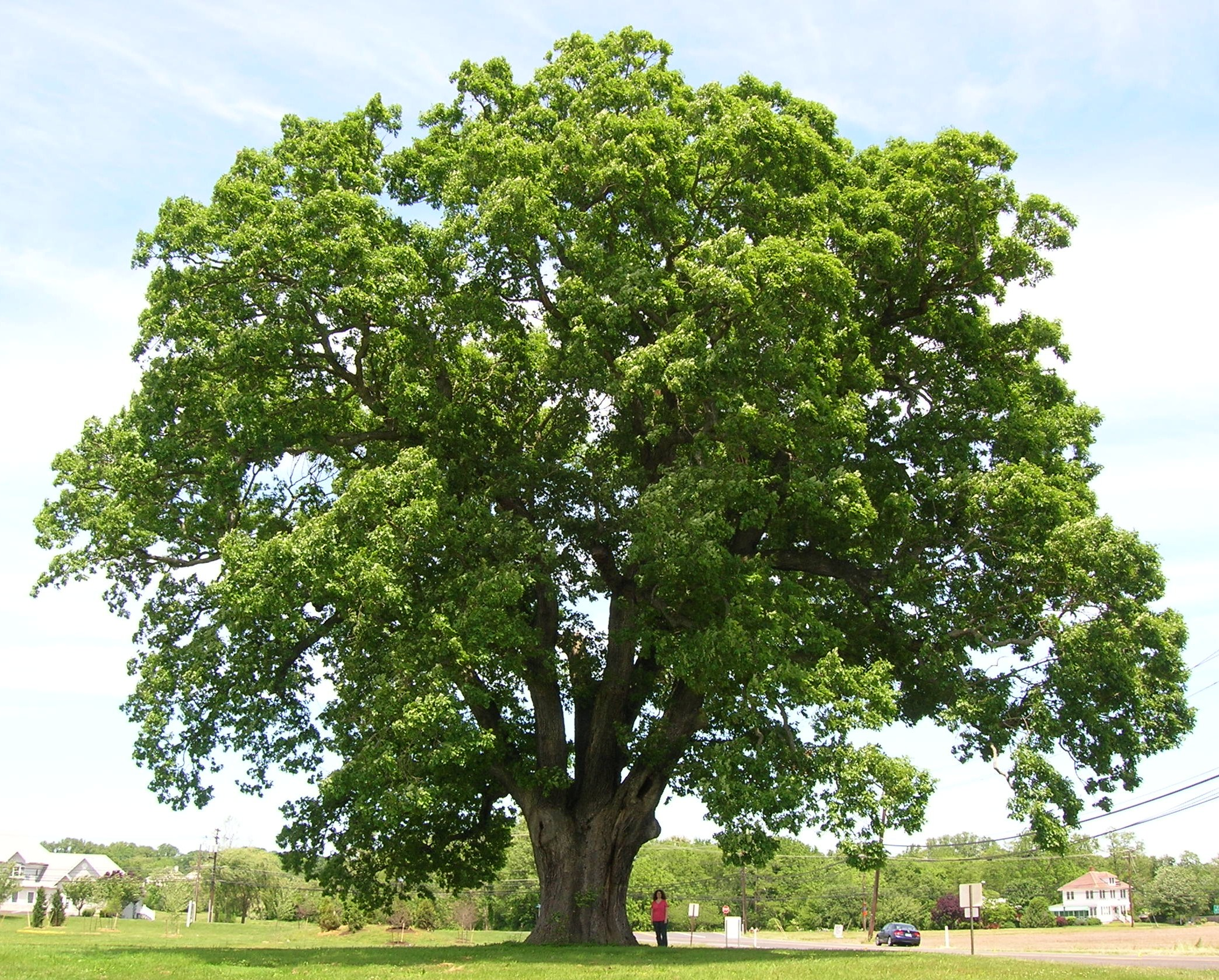
Oaks are popular shade trees.

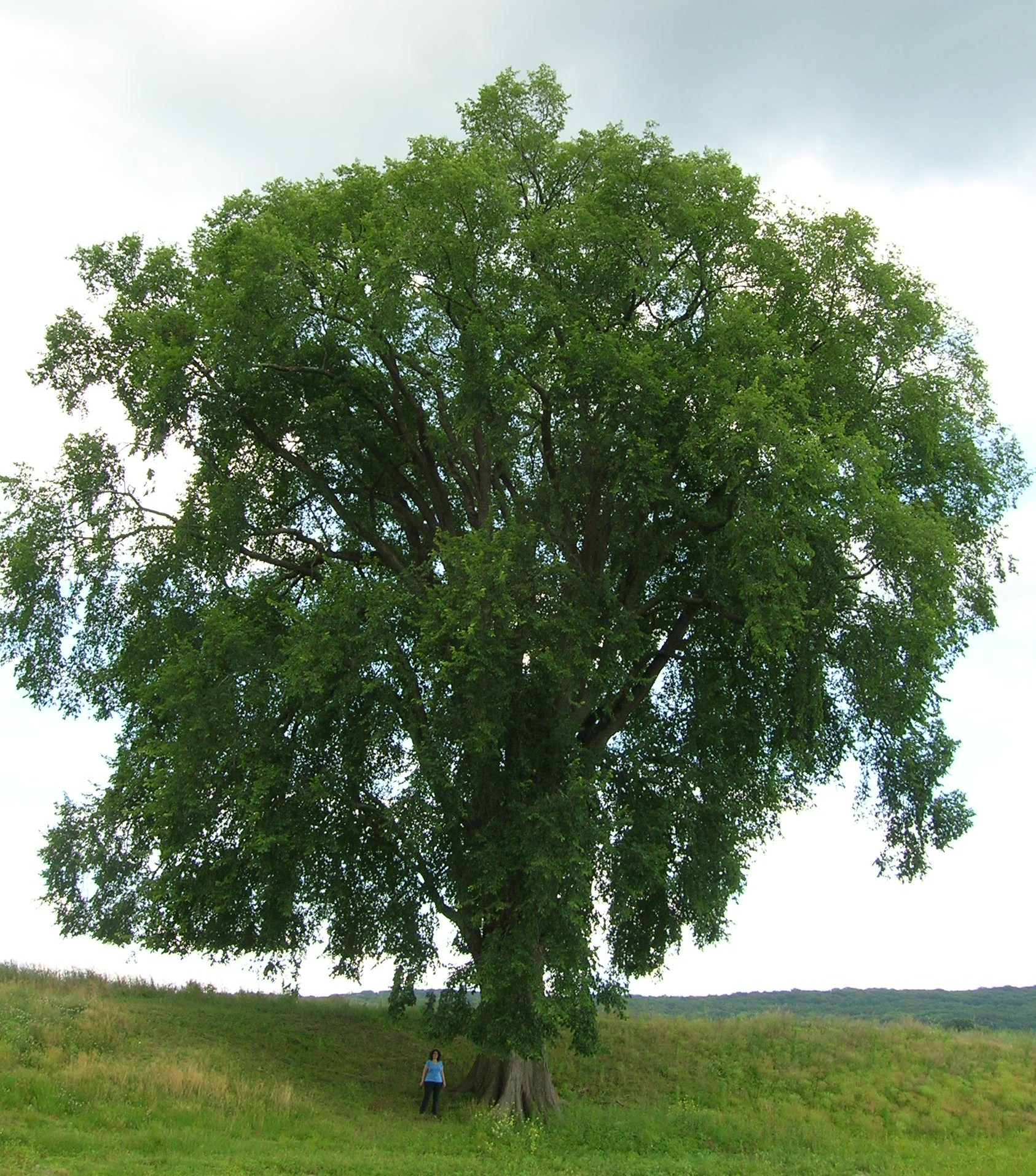
A shade-providing elm tree

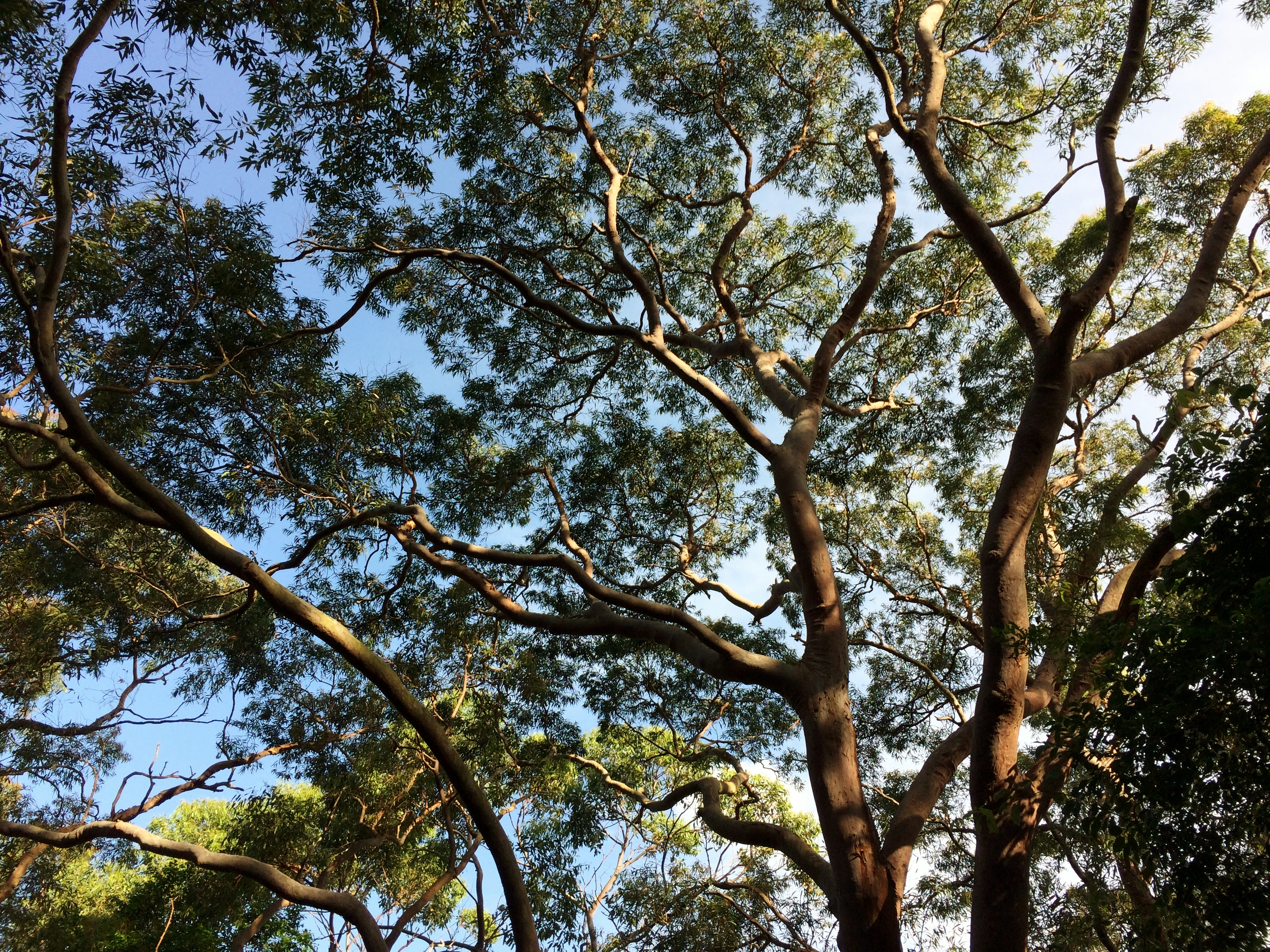
The twisting habit of angophoras provide good shade.

These trees are commonly grown, and/or used, as shade trees due to their protuberant size:

- American elm
- American sycamore
- Austrian oak
- Brush box
- Banyan tree
- Black walnut
- Blue jacaranda
- Camphor laurel
- Cape chestnut
- Carob tree
- Chinese elm
- Coast coral tree
- European beech
- Honey locust
- Golden ash
- Golden rain tree
- Holm oak
- Hopea odorata
- Hill's weeping fig
- Indian horse-chestnut
- Japanese elm
- London plane
- Moreton Bay fig
- Norway maple
- Oriental plane
- Palestine oak
- Pepper tree
- Port Jackson fig
- Red maple
- Royal poinciana
- Rough-barked apple
- Scarlet oak
- Scholar tree
- Silver linden
- Shumard oak
- Small-leaved fig
- Southern live oak
- Swamp Spanish oak
- Sweet gum
- Sycamore fig
- Sycamore maple
- Sydney red gum
- Tulipwood
- White feather honeymyrtle
- Yellow box

== Planting ==
There are a few factors to consider when choosing a shade tree: deciduousness, coverage, longevity, and the ability of the roots to damage foundations. Shade trees can enhance the privacy of a garden, patio, or back yard, by obstructing the view of outsiders. A disadvantage is that in cool climates, an abundance of shade trees may lead to a dank environment in any nearby buildings or gardens. Shade trees must not be planted near chimneys as flying fire sparks can ignite tree branches which could cause rapidly expanding fires.

Planting shade trees around a home can also reduce the energy that homeowners use in the summer months. Planting shade trees in locations near a home air conditioner can keep the air conditioner cooler which helps it run more efficiently, so less energy is used.

== See also ==
- Landscaping
- Avenue (landscape)
