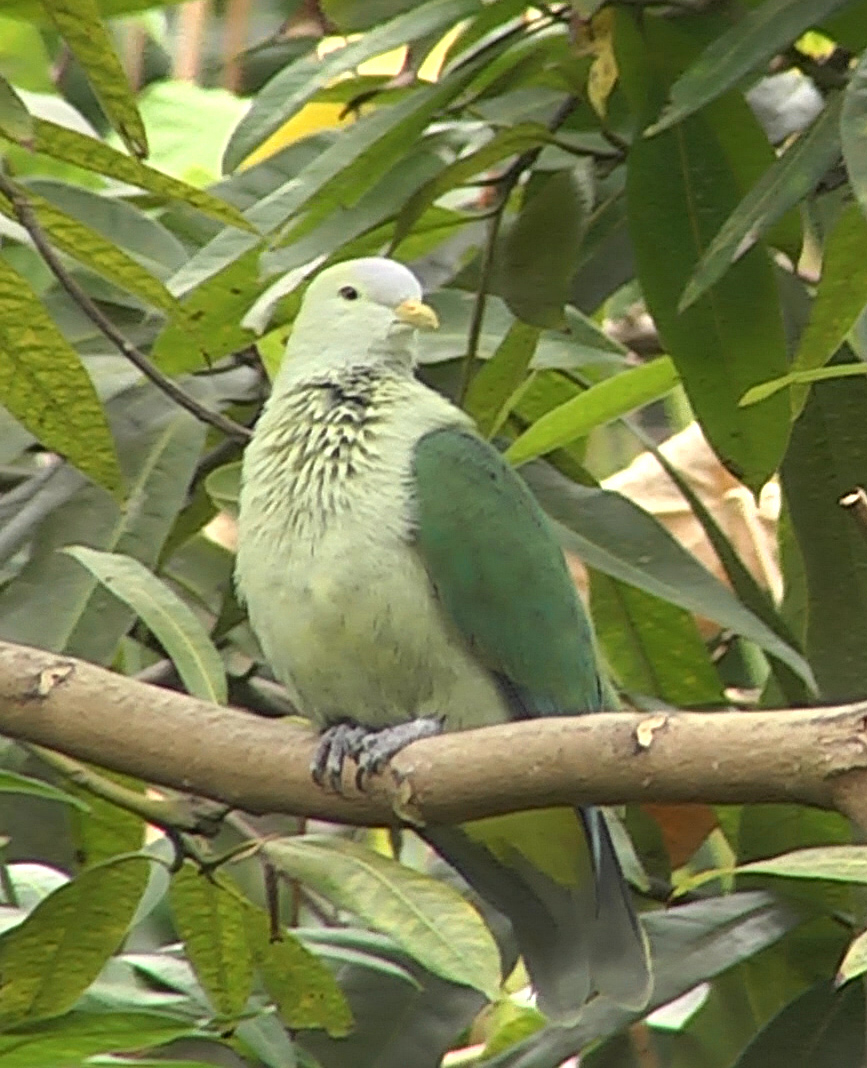

Conservation status
- Least Concern (IUCN 3.1)

Scientific classification
- Kingdom: Animalia
- Phylum: Chordata
- Class: Aves
- Order: Columbiformes
- Family: Columbidae
- Genus: Ptilinopus
- Species: P. purpuratus

Binomial name
- Ptilinopus purpuratus (Gmelin, JF, 1789)

= Grey-green fruit dove =

Species of bird

The grey-green fruit dove (Ptilinopus purpuratus) is a species of bird in the family Columbidae. It is endemic to the Society Islands in French Polynesia. Its natural habitat is subtropical or tropical moist lowland forests.

== Taxonomy ==
The grey-green fruit dove was formally described in 1789 by the German naturalist Johann Friedrich Gmelin in his revised and expanded edition of Carl Linnaeus's Systema Naturae. He placed it with all the other doves and pigeons in the genus Columba and coined the binomial name Columba purpurata. Gmelin's description was based on the "purple-crowned pigeon" from Otaheite (now Tahiti) that had been described in 1783 by English ornithologist John Latham in his A General Synopsis of Birds. The grey-green fruit dove is now placed with nearly 60 other fruit doves in the genus Ptilinopus that was introduced in 1825 by the English naturalist William Swainson. The genus name combines the Ancient Greek ptilon meaning "feather" with pous meaning "foot". The specific epithet purpuratus is from Latin and means "clad in purple".

Two subspecies are recognised:

- P. p. frater Ripley & Birckhead, 1942 – Moorea (island 17 km north west of Tahiti)
- P. p. purpuratus (Gmelin, JF, 1789) – Tahiti (east Society Islands, east Polynesia)

The Raiatea fruit-dove (P. chrysogaster) of Raiatea was formerly considered conspecific, but was split as a distinct species by the IOC in 2021.

== Distribution ==
The grey-green fruit dove is endemic to the French Polynesian islands of Tahiti and Mo'orea. There is an estimated population of 2,500 to 10,000 mature individual birds on the two islands, of which 5,000 - 6,000 live on Mo'orea, at an estimated density of 2-3 birds per hectare.

== Description ==
The grey-green fruit dove is around 20 cm (7.9 in) in overall length and weighs 95 g (3.4 oz). It is small and plump and has a short tail. The upperparts are olive green, the crown and forehead are light purple. The neck and chest are gray and the belly is pale yellow. There is a light gray band around the tail. The beak is yellowish or greenish yellow with an orange cere. The sexes are similar but the female has a greenish tinge to the grey of the head and neck. The juvenile lacks the light purple crown and is duller.

== Behaviour and ecology ==
=== Food and feeding ===
Feeding is almost entire arboreal. This contrasts with the closely related atoll fruit dove (Ptilinopus coralensis). The diet consists various plants including chili peppers (Capsicum), guava (Psidium) and figs (Ficus).

=== Breeding ===
The nest is a flimsy platform of sticks placed in a tree. A single white egg is laid.

== Threats ==
In 1907, the grey-green fruit dove was reportedly very abundant on the two islands. However the population has declined since then. There is an ongoing slow population decline due to habitat destruction, the introduction of non-native plants, predation by invasive species such as the swamp harrier and feral cats, and competition by invasive red-vented bulbul and common myna.
