= Mohammed Dilawar =

Indian conservationist

- Born: 20 March 1980 (age 46); Nashik, Maharashtra, India
- Occupations: Founder and President of Nature Forever Society
- Parent(s): Esmail Dilawar; Duriya Dilwar

Mohammed Dilawar is an Indian conservationist. He is the Founder and President of Nature Forever Society which was formally registered in 2009.

== Biography ==
Starting out as a volunteer at the grassroot level conducting surveys and creating awareness about conservation, Dilawar completed his master's in ecology and worked as a Lecturer and Head of the Department at a RYK College of Science Nashik for a year before joining Bombay Natural History Society as Project Officer in 2005 and working on the Royal Society for the Protection of Birds (RSPB) project in 2006. He worked with BNHS till 2008. The project was about "Safeguarding Key IBA sites of India". He headed the Project "Decline of House Sparrows in the Urban Sub-Habitats of India" and worked on the report submitted to the MoEF on "Impacts of Cell Phone Towers on Wildlife and Bees".

He is a member of the International Working Group on Urban Sparrows and represents the Afro Asian Region. He has attended the conference in UK in 2009 for devising methodology of monitoring house sparrows in Urban built-up areas. He has travelled widely across various protected areas of the country to observe, and photograph the wildlife and conservation issues associated with it.

In 2009 the Nature Forever Society was formally registered with Mohammed Dilawar as the President for the conservation of house sparrows and flora and fauna found in human habitats. He initiated the first World Sparrow Day in 2009. Today it is celebrated in more than 30 countries across the World.

He has also initiated Project Save Our Sparrows, the Annual Sparrows Awards started in 2011 and the BiodiverCity Photo Competition started in 2013.

He is presently working on the Common Bird Monitoring of India Program which will help in the monitoring 18 common bird species of India.

== Awards and honours ==
Dilawar was named one of the "Heroes of the Environment" in 2008 by Time magazine in their list of the 30 most influential Environmentalists in the world.

He is also the recipient of the Limca Book of Records for conservation of house sparrows and Guinness Book of Records in 2011 for the largest distribution of bird feeders in the world.

The Times Now news network named him one of the Amazing Indians in their series for his work on the conservation of house sparrows in the country.
