= Nature Forever Society =

Nonprofit organization

The Nature Forever Society (NFS) is a nonprofit organization that has works for the conservation of house sparrows and other common flora and fauna since 2006. It was founded by President Mohammed Dilawar and registered in 2008.

== Programs ==
=== Common Bird Monitoring of India (CBMI) ===
The Common Bird Monitoring of India program was launched in Mumbai, India. On the occasion of World Sparrow Day on 20 March 2012, with the goal of monitoring common birds found in India.

=== World Sparrow Day (WSD) ===
World Sparrow Day is an initiative celebrated on 20 March every year as World Sparrow Day. World Sparrow Day was first celebrated in 2010.

=== Project Save Our Sparrow (SOS) ===
Nature Forever Society, in association with the Burhani Foundation, implemented project SOS where 52,000 bird feeders were distributed across the world. The project was recognized by the Guinness Book of World Records for having the highest distribution of bird feeders in the world.

== State bird of Delhi ==
The Nature Forever Society proposed to the Delhi government that the house sparrow be declared the state bird of Delhi. At a campaign Rise for the Sparrows, Delhi Chief Minister Sheila Dikshit declared the sparrow the "state bird" of Delhi on 14 August 2012.
