= Argas keiransi =

Scientific classification
- Domain: Eukaryota
- Kingdom: Animalia
- Phylum: Arthropoda
- Subphylum: Chelicerata
- Class: Arachnida
- Order: Ixodida
- Family: Argasidae
- Genus: Argas
- Species: A. keiransi

Binomial name
- Argas keiransi Estrada-Peña, Venzal & González-Acuña, 2003

Species of tick

Argas keiransi is a species of argasid tick in the subgenus Persicargus that parasitizes the chimango, a falconid bird of prey found in the Sub-Antarctic biogeographical region; the type species was collected in Chillán, Chile. The species name honors the scientific contributions of James E. Keirans. A. keiransi is similar to, but morphologically distinct from, Argas giganteus Kohls & Clifford, 1968.
