= Argas africolumbae =

Scientific classification
- Domain: Eukaryota
- Kingdom: Animalia
- Phylum: Arthropoda
- Subphylum: Chelicerata
- Class: Arachnida
- Order: Ixodida
- Family: Argasidae
- Genus: Argas
- Species: A. africolumbae

Binomial name
- Argas africolumbae Hoogstraal, Kaiser, Walker, Ledger, Converse & Rice, 1975

Species of tick

Argas africolumbae is a small soft-bodied tick that is found primarily on chickens and birds including the pale crag martin.
