= Common Bird Monitoring of India =

The Common Bird Monitoring Program is a citizen science bird monitoring program of India. It is a pioneer project that aims to engage general public in the collection of baseline data on 18 common bird species. Data collected will be used to map species abundance and distribution throughout the Indian subcontinent.

The program is an initiative of the Nature Forever Society, supported by the Jaypee Group. It was launched in the city of Mumbai on World Sparrow Day, 20 March 2012. Bombay Natural History Society (BNHS), Mumbai, launched its Common Bird Monitoring Program in 2015. BNHS follows a scientific methodology and recommends following the Line Transect Method. In this method the participant walks along a predetermined route at a fixed pace and records the birds on or near the line. The observations are recorded in a standard data sheet provided by BNHS. It is recommended that each site be visited thrice in a year covering three major seasons in India, summer, winter and monsoon. The count should ideally start around 0700 hrs and not later than 0900 hrs. The monsoon bird count was conducted on 11 September 2016. BNHS is conducting workshops of bird watchers across the country to train them in this methodology so that the data is robust and correct.

== Importance of monitoring ==
Biological monitoring helps to establish a baseline for natural variability in species abundance and distribution. Once established, this baseline can serve as an important tool for identifying changes that might indicate population decline in some areas. This can act as an early warning system to initiate conservation measures to help prevent further population decline, and ultimately help support biodiversity.

In this project, data gathered will help to map the abundance and distribution of 18 species of birds common to India. Over a period of time, these baseline data will fill a critical gap in the knowledge of these birds' ecologies. In the future, statistical analyses of these data can be utilized for directing conservation efforts and may help to initiate measures to protect these bird species from decline.

These data are important for avian biodiversity in India and can be used as an advocacy tool. This program will also help to raise awareness and interest in the public regarding the conservation of common birds.

Past examples of species that might have been helped by this kind of program include the critically endangered white-rumped vulture. A once abundant and widespread species in Southeast Asia, this species declined rapidly in the 1990s. A detailed monitoring program may have alerted researchers to the decline of its populations and provided opportunities to conserve it.

== History of common bird monitoring programs ==
International examples of bird monitoring programs involving citizens include the Christmas Bird Count in the United States, an annual event since 1900.

== Monitoring format ==
Participants spend a minimum of fifteen minutes observing birds from any location, including their homes. A bird guide is provided to assist with identification. They then enter the data in a simple online form. Participants can travel to perform observations at multiple locations.

== Objectives ==
Objectives of the project include:

- Assisting in avian conservation efforts
- Generating statistical data on common birds
- Developing long-term conservation plans
- Acting as an early warning system to prevent species declines
- Helping policy makers, town planners, and researchers in conservation
- Increasing the science literacy of the citizens of India

== Species ==
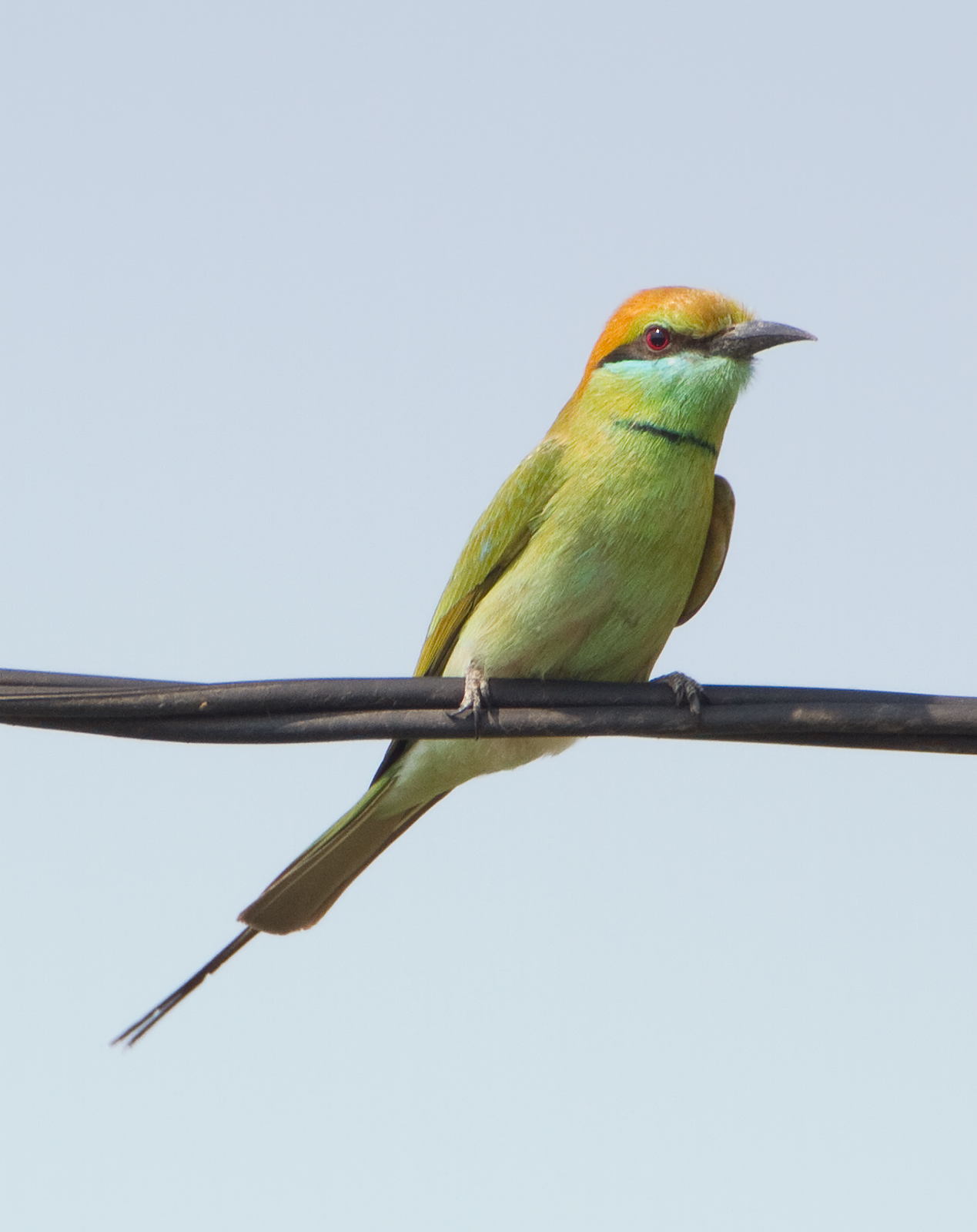
Asian green bee-eater (Merops orientalis)

The 18 species of birds currently being monitored are:

Sr.No	Common name	Scientific name
1	Coppersmith barbet	Megalaima haemacephala
2	Common hoopoe	Upupa epops
3	White-throated kingfisher	Halcyon smyrnensis
4	Asian green bee-eater	Merops orientalis
5	Greater coucal	Centropus sinensis
6	Rose-ringed parakeet	Psittacula krameri
7	Rock pigeon	Columba livia
8	Black kite	Milvus migrans
9	Cattle egret	Bubulcus ibis
10	House crow	Corvus splendens
11	Black drongo	Dicrurus macrocercus
12	Indian robin	Saxicoloides fulicatus
13	Common myna	Acridotheres tristis
14	Barn swallow	Hirundo rustica
15	Red-vented bulbul	Pycnonotus cafer
16	Ashy prinia	Prinia socialis
17	Purple sunbird	Nectarinia asiatica
18	House sparrow	Passer domesticus

== See also ==
- List of endangered animals in India
