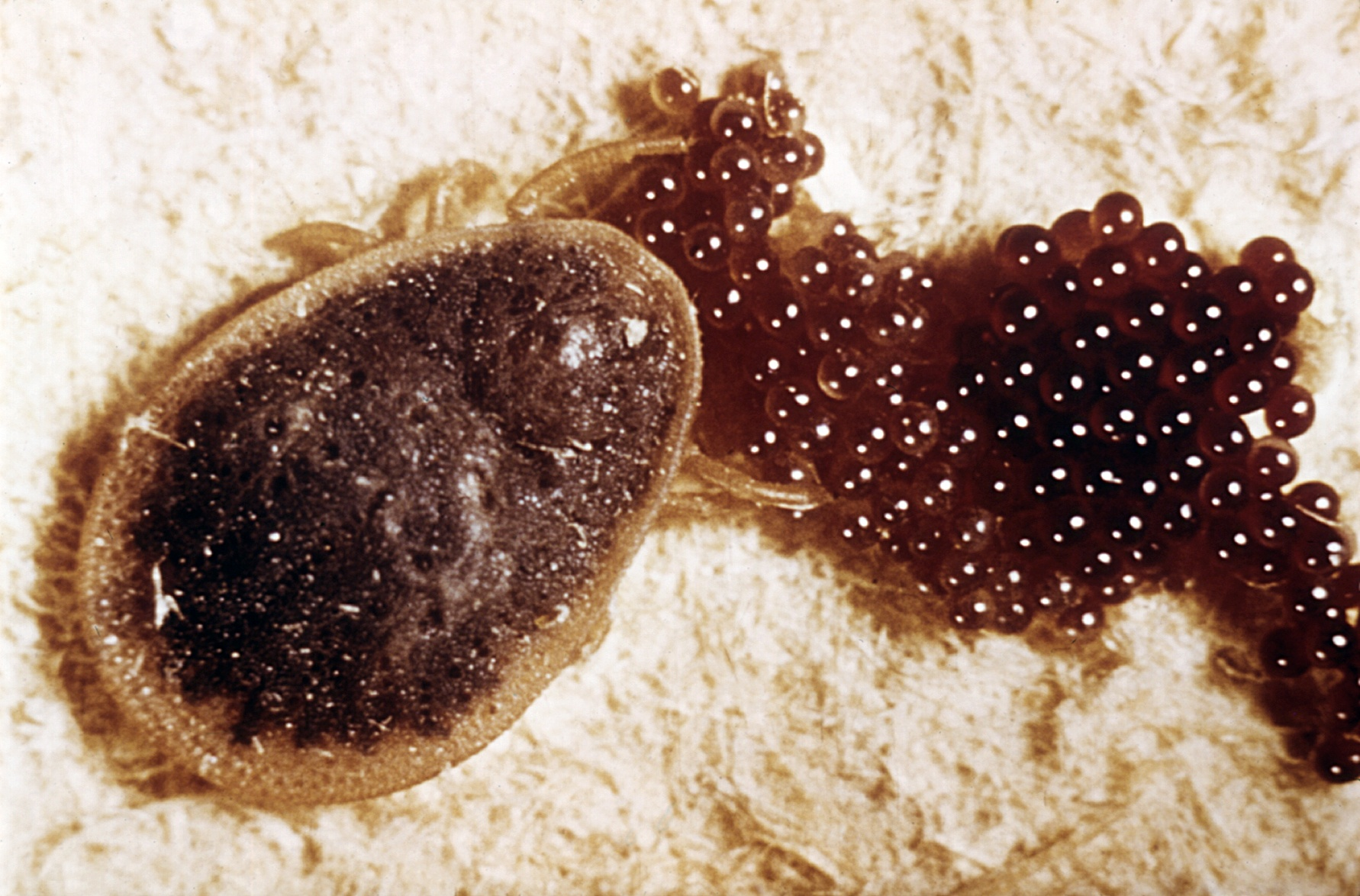
- Argas species from a pigeon.

Scientific classification
- Kingdom: Animalia
- Phylum: Arthropoda
- Subphylum: Chelicerata
- Class: Arachnida
- Order: Ixodida
- Family: Argasidae
- Subfamily: Argasinae
- Genus: Argas; Latreille, 1795

= Argas =

Genus of ticks

Argas is a genus of soft tick in the family Argasidae.

== Species ==
Argas is one of six genera in the Argasid subfamily Argasinae. The genus currently contains 44 species over 2 subgenera.

=== Argas ===
- A. (Argas) africolumbae Hoogstraal, Kaiser, Walker, Ledger, Converse and Rice, 1975
- A. (Argas) arboreus Kaiser, Hoogstraal and Kohls, 1964
- A. (Argas) assimilis Teng and Song, 1983
- A. (Argas) beijingensis Teng, 1983
- A. (Argas) brevipes Banks, 1908
- A. (Argas) bureschi Dryenski, 1957
- A. (Argas) cooleyi Kohls and Hoogstraal, 1960
- A. (Argas) cucumerinus Neumann, 1901
- A. (Argas) dalei Clifford, Keirans, Hoogstraal and Corwin, 1976
- A. (Argas) delicatus Neumann, 1910
- A. (Argas) dulus Keirans, Clifford and Capriles, 1971
- A. (Argas) falco Kaiser and Hoogstraal, 1974
- A. (Argas) hermanni Audouin, 1826
- A. (Argas) himalayensis Hoogstraal and Kaiser, 1973
- A. (Argas) japonicus Yamaguti, Clifford and Tipton, 1968
- A. (Argas) lagenoplastis Froggatt, 1906
- A. (Argas) latus Filippova, 1961
- A. (Argas) lowryae Kaiser and Hoogstraal, 1975
- A. (Argas) macrostigmatus Filippova, 1961
- A. (Argas) magnus Neumann, 1896
- A. (Argas) monachus Keirans, Radovsky and Clifford, 1973
- A. (Argas) monolakensis Schwan, Corwin and Brown, 1992
- A. (Argas) moreli Keirans, Hoogstraal and Clifford, 1979
- A. (Argas) neghmei Kohls and Hoogstraal, 1961
- A. (Argas) polonicus Siuda, Hoogstraal, Clifford and Wassef, 1979
- A. (Argas) reflexus (Fabricius, 1794)
- A. (Argas) tridentatus Filippova, 1961
- A. (Argas) vulgaris Filippova, 1961

=== Persicargas ===
- A. (Persicargas) abdussalami Hoogstraal and McCarthy, 1965
- A. (Persicargas) beklemischevi Pospelova-Shtrom, Vasil´yeva and Semashko, 1963
- A. (Persicargas) giganteus Kohls and Clifford, 1968
- A. (Persicargas) gilcolladoi Estrada-Peña, Lucientes and Sánchez, 1987
- A. (Persicargas) keiransi Estrada-Peña, Venzal and González-Acuña, 2003
- A. (Persicargas) miniatus Koch, 1844
- A. (Persicargas) nullarborensis Hoogstraal and Kaiser, 1973
- A. (Persicargas) persicus (Oken, 1818)
- A. (Persicargas) radiatus Railliet, 1893
- A. (Persicargas) ricei Hoogstraal, Kaiser, Clifford and Keirans, 1975
- A. (Persicargas) robertsi Hoogstraal, Kaiser and Kohls, 1968
- A. (Persicargas) sanchezi Dugès, 1887
- A. (Persicargas) streptopelia Kaiser, Hoogstraal and Horner, 1970
- A. (Persicargas) theilerae Hoogstraal and Kaiser, 1970
- A. (Persicargas) walkerae Kaiser and Hoogstraal, 1969
- A. (Persicargas) zumpti Hoogstraal, Kaiser and Kohls, 1968
