= World Sparrow Day =

Special day to raise awareness of sparrows

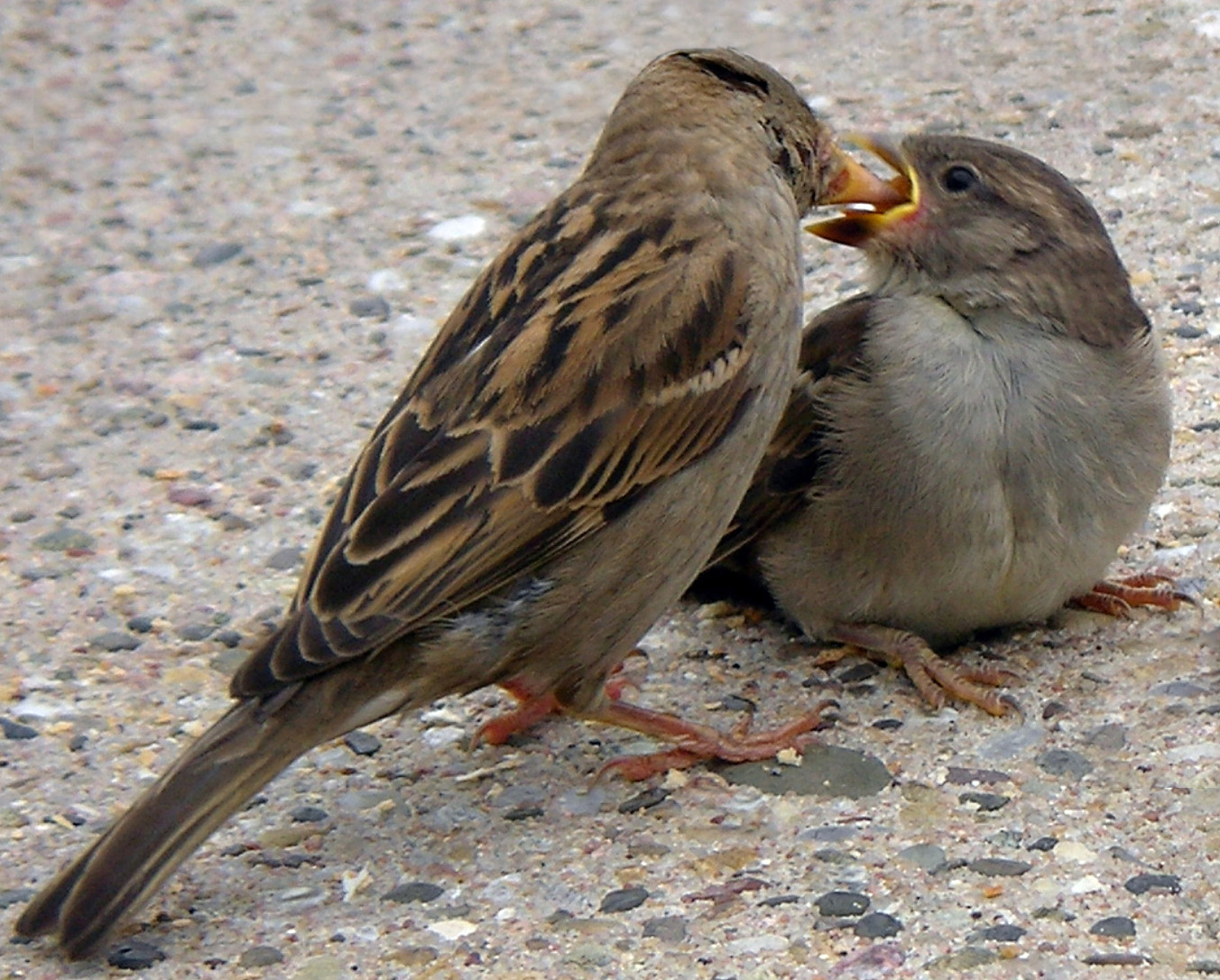
Female house sparrow feeding a fledgling

House Sparrow song and calls recorded at Cowley, Gloucestershire, England

World Sparrow Day is a day designated to raise awareness of the house sparrow and then other common birds to urban environments, and of threats to their populations, observed on 20 March. It is an international initiative by the Nature Forever Society of India in collaboration with the Eco-Sys Action Foundation (France) and numerous other national and international organisations across the world.

The Nature Forever Society was started by Mohammed Dilawar, an Indian conservationist who started his work helping the house sparrow in Nashik, and who was named one of the "Heroes of the Environment" for 2008 by Time for his efforts. The idea of marking World Sparrow Day came up during an informal discussion at the Nature Forever Society's office. The idea was to earmark a day for the house sparrow to convey the message of conservation of the house sparrow and other common birds and also mark a day of celebration to appreciate the beauty of the common biodiversity which is taken so much for granted. The first World Sparrow Day was celebrated in 2010 in different parts of the world. The day was celebrated by carrying out different various kinds of activities and events like art competitions, awareness campaigns, and sparrow processions as well as interactions with media.

World Sparrow Day also has a broader vision to provide a platform where people who are working on the conservation of the house sparrow and other common birds can network, collaborate and exchange conservation ideas which will lead to better science and improved results. It aims to provide a meeting ground for people from different parts of the world to come together and form a force that can play an important role in advocacy and in spreading the awareness on the need of conserving common biodiversity or species of lower conservation status.

== Sparrow Awards ==
To encourage efforts made towards this cause and to selflessly conserve the environment, NFS has instituted the first Sparrow Awards in Ahmedabad, Gujarat, on 20 March 2011. In 2013, one of the key facilitators who has joined forces with NFS and supports Sparrow Awards is Sustainuance magazine. The Editor-In-Chief of the magazine, Shashwat D.C. who convened the event and handed out the award to the winners stated, "These awardees are unsung heroes who come from all walks of life. And what is remarkable is that they usually work without any government funding and do not seek any recognition."

Winners of Sparrow Awards 2014

- Jag Mohan Garg
- N. Shehzad & M. Saud
- Jal Grahan Kameti, Piplantri

Winners of Sparrow Awards 2013

- Saleem Hameedi, Wildlife Photographer, Illustrator
- Aabid Surti, Litterateur & Head Of NGO, Drop Dead
- Jayant Govind Dukhande, Mumbai Police

Winners of Sparrow Awards 2012

- Dilsher Khan
- Ramita Kondepudi
- Individuals (VikramYende, Kapil Jadhav, Mahendra Khawnekar and Vishal Revankar)
- Mahatma Gandhi Ashramshala

Winners of Sparrow Awards 2011

- Bhavin Shah
- Narendra Singh Chaudhary
- L Shyamal
- The Sparrow Company
