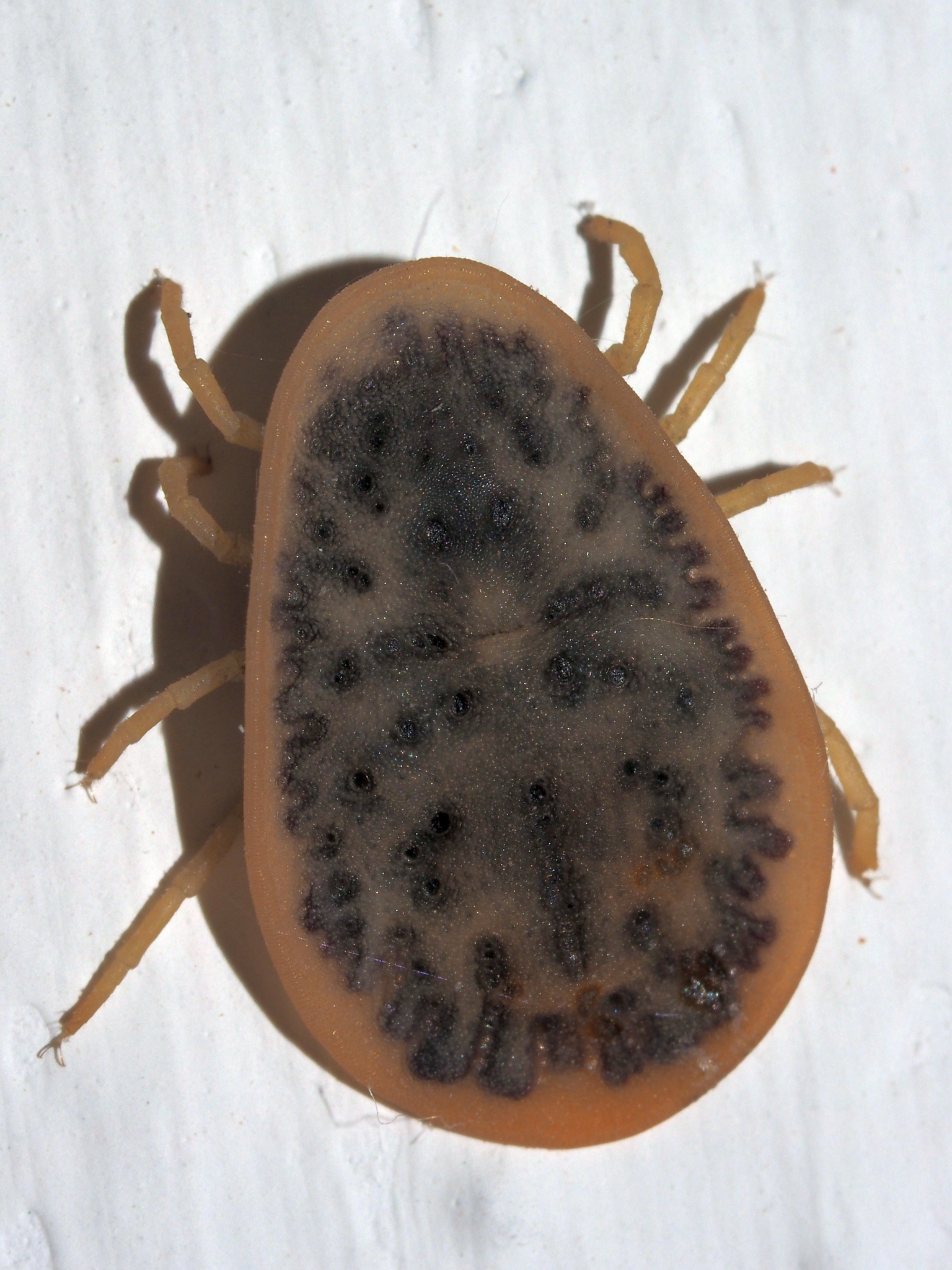

Scientific classification
- Kingdom: Animalia
- Phylum: Arthropoda
- Subphylum: Chelicerata
- Class: Arachnida
- Order: Ixodida
- Family: Argasidae
- Genus: Argas
- Species: A. reflexus

Binomial name
- Argas reflexus Fabricius, 1974

Synonyms
- List: Argas (Argas) reflexus Hoogstraal & Kaiser, 1973; Argas reflexus reflexus Kaiser, Hoogstraal & Kohls, 1964; Argas columbae Weyer, 1948; Argas columbarum Schulze, 1932; Ixodes espagnol Brebisson, 1827; Ixodes hispanus Brebisson, 1827; Ixodes columbae Fabricius, 1805; Ixodes reflexus Fabricius, 1805; Rhynochoprion columbae Hermann, 1804; Acarus reflexus Latreille, 1796; Argas marginatus Latreille, 1796; Acarus marginatus Fabricius, 1794; Acarus columbarum Shaw, 1793

= Argas reflexus =

Species of tick

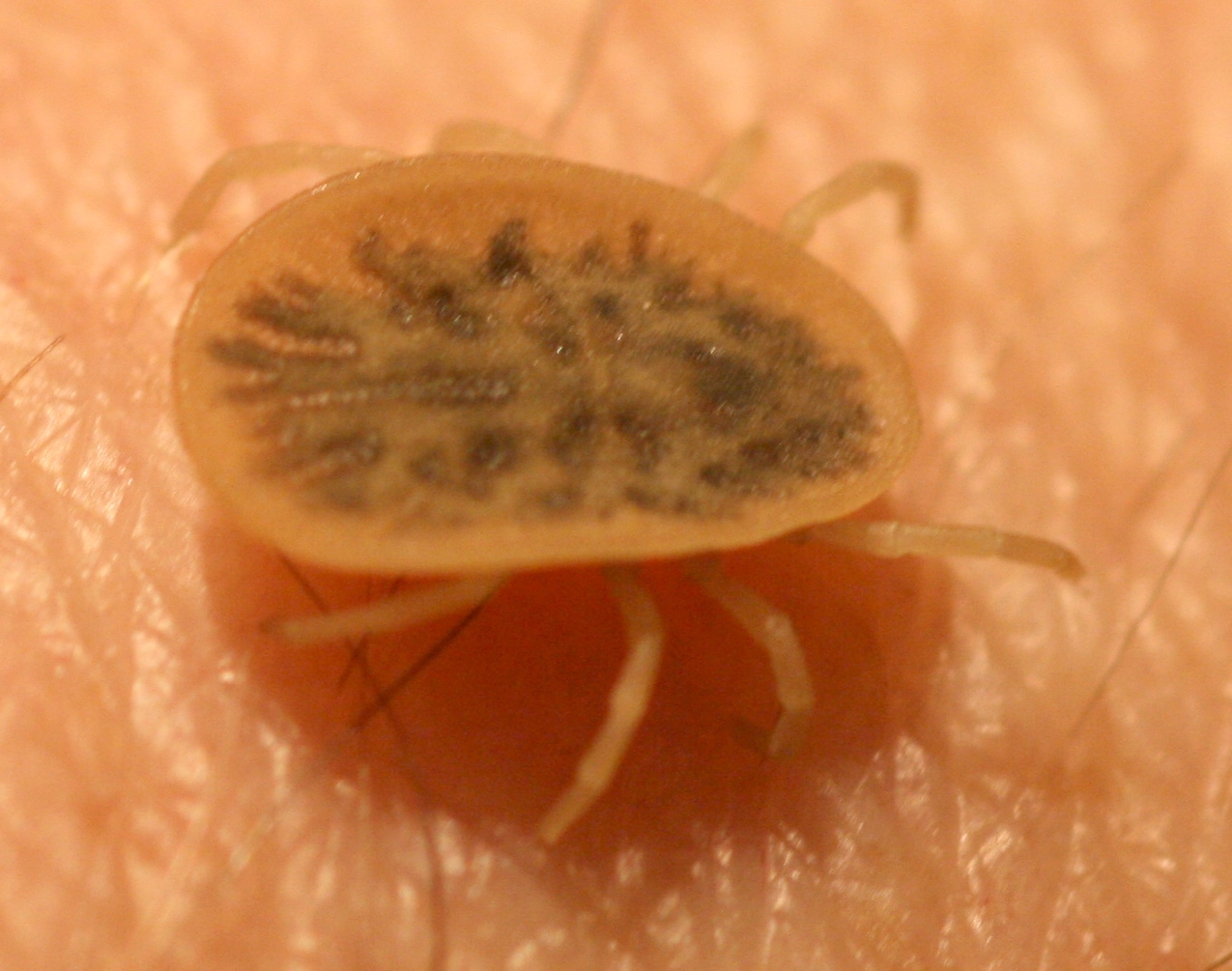
Female pigeon tick

Argas reflexus, commonly known as the pigeon tick, is a species of soft tick in the family Argasidae. It is a hematophagous ectoparasite primarily associated with pigeons but is known to bite humans in the absence of its primary host. Human exposure can result in local irritation, allergic reactions, and, in severe cases, anaphylaxis.

== Description ==
The pigeon tick Argas reflexus was first described in Italy. It is a nidicolous, endophilic, polyphasic, and monotropic species that originally parasitized various wild bird species, with pigeons being its preferred host.

== Ecology and behavior ==
Argas reflexus demonstrates exceptional ecological success due to a combination of distinctive morphological, physiological, and behavioral traits. Despite its relatively slow population growth, it has been found in large numbers, often of several thousand nymphs and adults, in infested buildings. Its exceptional adaptations include the ability to conserve energy between blood meals and survive without feeding for 3–5 years, or up to 9 years in extreme cases. The species exhibits the lowest relative net water loss rate recorded among arthropods and can compensate for water loss by absorbing atmospheric moisture at relative humidities around 75%. It also shows high tolerance to temperature extremes, enabling survival in environments such as attics, which are typically dry and subject to wide temperature fluctuations.

Argas reflexus is nocturnal. Most infestations in human residences are detected during the spring and early summer, coinciding with peak tick activity observed in studies. However, individual ticks may also become active during the winter months, especially during mild weather conditions or in heated indoor environments.

Among various tested stimuli, only heat was found to influence host-finding behavior. Within its habitat, the tick's movements appear to be random until it encounters a specific heat source. This heat cue is effective only over short distances, typically within the immediate vicinity of a pigeon nest. Given that A. reflexus spends its entire life cycle in close proximity to its host, this behavior is well-adapted to its ecological niche.

Locomotor activity in A. reflexus appears to be limited mainly to brief host-seeking periods, with the remainder of the time spent resting in wall crevices and wooden structures. The species also displays aggregation behavior, which may help further reduce individual water loss.

=== Diet ===
Argas reflexus naturally feeds on feral pigeons but will use humans as substitute hosts when pigeon populations are low or absent. However, it cannot sustain a population on human blood alone, as the ticks die after feeding on humans. Consequently, human infestations of A. reflexus can always be traced back to the presence of an animal host, almost exclusively feral pigeons. The tick feeds at night, attaching briefly to its host just long enough to take a blood meal.

=== Habitat and distribution ===
The tick's geographical distribution extends from the British Isles and Spain in the west, across Mediterranean countries, to Israel, Egypt, Crimea, and the Caucasus in the east, and has expanded to East Asia and other regions to which the rock pigeon was introduced. It is the most common synanthropic mite in Central Europe. The climatic conditions within this range allow for the completion of embryonic development before the onset of colder seasons. Optimal conditions for embryogenesis and larval hatching are temperatures around 25 °C and relative humidity levels between 10% and 75%. Although A. reflexus can develop in high humidity (up to 90%), such conditions tend to disrupt egg development and larval emergence.

Argas reflexus typically inhabits the cracks and crevices of pigeon nests. A substantial accumulation of ticks at a given site typically requires several years, even under ideal conditions.

=== Life cycle ===
Due to the pronounced diapause behavior in engorged A. reflexus, progression from one stage or instar to the next can take up to a year. The species' generation time is estimated to range between 3 and 11 years, depending on its developmental history and the number of gonotrophic cycles completed by the female.

== Relationship with humans. ==
Argas reflexus can transmit pathogens and is associated with IgE-mediated allergic responses in humans, including life-threatening systemic reactions. Because of its ability to infest human habitations, the species is considered a public health concern in areas with large pigeon populations.

=== Control and management ===
The species' survival adaptions make controlling it particularly challenging and costly, especially in renovated or redeveloped buildings.

Traditional control of A. reflexus relies on chemical acaricides, such as organophosphates, pyrethroids, and amidines. However, the development of resistance, potential human toxicity, and environmental contamination have prompted research into alternative control methods.

In cases of A. reflexus infestation, it is strongly recommended that specialists carry out a series of targeted steps. These include identification of the tick species, interviewing neighbors, investigating sting reactions and any unidentified arthropods found, and conducting a thorough search for nearby pigeon roosts, which typically serve as the infestation source. Once identified, the source should be eliminated, followed by cleaning and disinfestation of former pigeon nesting sites. Additional measures should include the implementation of effective pigeon exclusion strategies and a final assessment to confirm the success of the control efforts.

Effective control of A. reflexus typically requires locating and exposing all of the tick's hiding places, followed by the application of pyrethrum, which has a repellent effect, and subsequent treatment with a contact pesticide containing propoxur. Because some ticks, especially eggs, may survive the initial treatment, control efforts must be repeated.

Given the complexity and expense of eradicating the species, preventive strategies are recommended. In particular, efforts should focus on preventing pigeon nesting near human dwellings.

==== Biological control ====
Entomopathogenic fungi, particularly Metarhizium anisopliae, have been investigated as biocontrol agents. In laboratory studies, three strains of M. anisopliae, V245 (Finland), 685 (UK), and 715C (Iran), were tested against different life stages of A. reflexus (eggs, larvae, engorged, and unfed adults).

All fungal strains significantly reduced egg hatchability and induced high mortality in larvae and adults. Strain V245 was the most effective, causing nearly 100% larval mortality at the lowest conidial concentration (10^{3} conidia/mL) within 10 days. Adult ticks, especially engorged females, were more susceptible than unfed adults. The estimated LC_{50} values demonstrated strain-dependent and time-dependent pathogenicity, suggesting that M. anisopliae has strong potential as a biological control agent for A. reflexus.
