= 1985 in paleontology =

List of years in paleontology	(table)
- … 1975; 1976; 1977; 1978; 1979; 1980; 1981; 1982; 1983; 1984; 1985; 1986; 1987; 1988; 1989; 1990; 1991; 1992; 1993; 1994; 1995 …
- In science 1982 1983 1984 1985 1986 1987 1988
- Art; Archaeology; Architecture; Literature; Music; Philosophy; Science; +...

Paleontology or palaeontology is the study of prehistoric life forms on Earth through the examination of plant and animal fossils. This includes the study of body fossils, tracks (ichnites), burrows, cast-off parts, fossilised feces (coprolites), palynomorphs and chemical residues. Because humans have encountered fossils for millennia, paleontology has a long history both before and after becoming formalized as a science. This article records significant discoveries and events related to paleontology that occurred or were published in the year 1985.

== Molluscs ==
=== Bivalves ===
Name	Novelty	Status	Authors	Age	Unit	Location	Notes	Images
Oryzoconcha	gen et sp nov	not valid	He & Pei	Early Cambrian	Henan province	China	synonym of Pojetaia runnegari	
Tuarangia	Ord, Supfam, fam, gen et sp nov	valid	MacKinnon	late Middle Cambrian	Tasman Formation	New Zealand	one of four accepted Cambrian bivalves	

== Arthropods ==
=== Insects ===
Name	Novelty	Status	Authors	Age	Unit	Location	Notes	Images
Azteca alpha	Sp nov	valid	Poinar	Burdigalian	Dominican Amber	Dominican Republic	A dolichoderine ant	Azteca alpha
Azteca eumeces	Sp nov	valid	Poinar	Burdigalian	Dominican Amber	Dominican Republic	A dolichoderine ant	
Dominickus	gen et sp. nov	valid	Tindale	Priabonian	Florissant Formation	USA	A castniid butterfly-moth, monotypic	

== Echinoderms ==
Name	Novelty	Status	Authors	Age	Unit	Location	Notes	Images
Castericystis	Gen et sp nov	Valid	Ubaghs & Robison	Middle Cambrian	Marjum Formation	United States	A solutan.	Castericystis
Marjumicystis	Gen et sp nov	Valid	Ubaghs & Robison	Middle Cambrian	Marjum Formation	United States	An eocrinoid.	

== Fish ==
=== Newly named Cartilaginous fish ===
Name	Novelty	Status	Authors	Age	Type locality	Location	Notes	Images
Lissodus wirksworthensis	Sp nov	jr synonym	Duffin	Early Carboniferous	Eyam Limestone	United Kingdom	A hybodont, moved to Reesodus wirksworthensis in 2013	

== Archosauromorphs ==
- Psittacosaurus gastroliths documented.

=== Newly named pseudosuchians ===
Name	Novelty	Status	Authors	Age	Unit	Location	Notes	Images
Postosuchus	Gen et sp nov	Valid	Chatterjee	Carnian–Norian	Cooper Canyon Formation; Chinle Formation; Newark Supergroup	United States	A rauisuchid.	

=== Newly named pterosaurs ===
Name	Novelty	Status	Authors	Age	Unit	Location	Notes	Images
Anhanguera	Gen et sp	Valid	Campos & Kellner	Aptian	Crato Formation	Brazil	A pterodactyloid belonging to Anhangueridae.	Anhanguera santanae
"Palaeolimnornis"	Gen et sp nov	Nomen nudum	Jurcsák & Kessler	Early Cretaceous	Bauxite mine	Romania	An informal name applied to Palaeocursornis. An azhdarchoid pterosaur.	

=== Newly named non-avian dinosaurs ===
Data courtesy of George Olshevsky's dinosaur genera list.

Name	Status	Authors		Location	Notes	Images
Abelisaurus	Valid taxon	Jose Bonaparte	Novas	Argentina	A short-handed Flesh-eating Dinosaur.	Abelisaurus
"Aliwalia"	Junior synonym.	Peter Galton			Junior subjective synonym of Eucnemosaurus.	
Blikanasaurus	Valid taxon	Peter Galton	van Heerden	South Africa		
Camelotia	Valid taxon	Peter Galton		UK	A British Melanorosaur.	Camelotia
Carnotaurus	Valid taxon	Jose Bonaparte		Argentina	An Abelisaurid. The Horned Cheetah of the Cretaceous.	Carnotaurus
"Dachungosaurus"	Nomen nudum.	Zhao X. (as Chao S.)				
"Dystylosaurus"	Junior synonym.	James A. Jensen			Junior synonym of Supersaurus.	
Gasosaurus	Valid taxon	Dong Zhiming		China		Gasosaurus
"Mifunesaurus"	Nomen nudum	Hisa		Japan		
"Moshisaurus"	Nomen nudum.	Hisa				
"Oshanosaurus"	Nomen nudum.	Zhao X. (as Chao S.)				
"Sanchusaurus"	Nomen nudum	Hisa				
Supersaurus	Valid taxon	James A. Jensen		Portugal; USA (Colorado)		Supersaurus
"Ultrasaurus"	Preoccupied name.	James A. Jensen			Preoccupied by Kim H. M., 1983 and renamed Ultrasauros.	
"Xuanhuasaurus"	Nomen nudum.	Zhao X. (as Chao S.)			Later renamed Xuanhuaceratops in 2006	

=== Literature on fossil birds ===
- Storrs Olson: the fossil record of birds

=== Newly named birds ===
Name	Status	Novelty	Authors	Age	Unit	Location	Notes	Images
Aegialornis szarskii	Valid	Sp. nov.	Dieter S. Peters	Middle Eocene	Messel pit, MP 11	Germany	An Aegialornithidae	
Amphipelargus dzabghanensis	Valid	Sp. nov.	Evgeny N. Kurochkin	Late Miocene-Pliocene	Chono-Harayah	Mongolia	A Gruiformes, Eogruidae	
Anas molesta	Valid	Sp. nov.	Evgeny N. Kurochkin	Late Miocene	Hyargas Nuur 2	Mongolia	An Anatidae, transferred to the genus Aythya by Nikita V. Zelenkov	
Anas schneideri	Valid	Sp. nov.	Steven D. Emslie	Late Pleistocene		USA	An Anatidae.	
Anser tchikoicus	Valid	Sp. nov.	Evgeny N. Kurochkin	Miocene-Pliocene		Mongolia	An Anatidae.	
Anthus seductus	Valid	Sp. nov.	Evgeny N. Kurochkin	Early Pliocene		Mongolia	A Motacillidae.	
Avisaurus archibaldi	Valid	Gen et Sp. nov.	Michael K. Brett-Surman Gregory S. Paul	Maastrichtian	Hell Creek Formation	USA (Montana and North Dakota)	An Enantiornithes, Avisauridae Brett-Surman & Paul, 1985 this is the type species of the new genus.	
Aythya magna	Valid	Gen. nov. et Sp. nov.	Evgeny N. Kurochkin	Early Pliocene	Hyargas Nuur Formation	Mongolia	An Anatidae.	
Aythya shihuibas	Valid	Sp. nov.	Hou Lianhai	Late Miocene		China	An Anatidae, Nikita V. Zelenkov, 2012 transferred the species to his genus Protomelanitta Zelenkov, 2011.	
Bonibernicla ponderosa	Valid	Gen. nov. et Sp. nov.	Evgeny N. Kurochkin	Late Miocene	Hyargas Nuur Formation	Mongolia; USA	An Anatidae, this is the type species of the new genus.	
Brasilogyps faustoi	Valid	Gen et Sp nov.	Herculano M. F. de Alvarenga	Early Oligocene	Taubate	Brazil	A Cathartidae, this is the type species of the new genus.	
Centropus colossus	Valid	Sp. nov.	Robert F. Baird	Quaternary	Green Waterhole Cave	Australia	A Cuculiformes, Centropodidae.	
Colius hendeyi	Valid	Sp. nov.	Patricia Vickers Rich Philippa J. Haarhoff	Early Pliocene	Varswater Formation	South Africa	A Coliidae.	
Corvus solitus	Valid	Sp. nov.	Evgeny N. Kurochkin	Miocene-Late Pliocene		Mongolia	A Corvidae.	
Diangallus mious	Valid	Gen. nov. et Sp. nov.	Hou Lianhai	Late Miocene		China	A Phasianidae, this is the type species of the new genus.	
Egretta subfluvia	Valid	Sp. nov.	Jonathan J. Becker	Late Miocene	Early Hemphillian	USA: Florida	An Ardeidae.	
Eudromia olsoni	Valid	Nom. nov.	Claudia P. Tambussi Eduardo P. Tonni	Late Pliocene	Monte Hermoso Formation	Argentina	A Tinamidae, new name for the preoccupied Tinamisornis intermedius Dabbene et Lillo, 1913 = Eudromia elegans intermedia (Dabbene et Lillo, 1913).	
Geronticus apelex	Valid	Sp. nov.	Storrs L. Olson	Early Pliocene	Varswater Formation	South Africa	A Threskiornithidae.	
Grus afghana	Valid	Sp. nov.	Cécile Mourer-Chauviré Jean-Christophe Balouet Yves Jehenne Émile Heintz	Late Miocene	MN 12	Afghanistan	A Gruidae.	
Haliaeetus fortis	Valid	Sp. nov.	Evgeny N. Kurochkin	Late Miocene	MN 13, Hyargas-Nuur 2	Mongolia	An Accipitridae.	
Heliadornis ashbyi	Valid	Gen. nov. et Sp. nov.	Storrs L. Olson	Middle Miocene	Langhian, Calvert Formation	USA; Belgium; Antwerp	A Phaethontidae, this is the type species of the new genus.	
Limosa lacrimosa	Valid	Sp. nov.	Evgeny N. Kurochkin	Miocene-Late Pliocene		Mongolia	A Scolopacidae.	
“Lophura” inferna	Not Valid	Sp. nov.	Evgeny N. Kurochkin	Miocene	Shaamar	Mongolia	A Phasianidae, not a Lophura, the holotype is not diagnostic to genus.	
Melopyrrha latirostris	Valid	Sp. nov.	David W. Steadman Gary S. Morgan	Late Pleistocene-Early Holocene	Cayman Brac cave deposits	Cayman Islands	A Thraupidae.	
Oceanites zaloscarthmus	Valid	Sp. nov.	Storrs L. Olson	Early Pliocene	Varswater Formation	South Africa	An Oceanitidae.	
Oenanthe infima	Valid	Sp. nov.	Evgeny N. Kurochkin	Miocene-Late Pliocene	Sharga	Mongolia	A Muscicapidae.	
Orthonyx hypsilophus	Valid	Sp. nov.	Robert F. Baird	Quaternary	Green Waterhole Cave	Australia	An Orthonychidae.	
Pachyptila salax	Valid	Sp. nov.	Storrs L. Olson	Early Pliocene	Varswater Formation	South Africa	A Procellariidae.	
Paleopsilopterus itaboraiensis	Valid	Gen. nov. et Sp. nov.	Herculano M. F. de Alvarenga	Itaboraian		Brazil	A Gruiformes, Phorusrhacidae Ameghino, 1889, Psilopterinae Mathilde Dolgopol de Sáez, 1927, this is the type species of the new genus.	
Palaeotodus escampsiensis	Valid	Sp. nov.	Cécile Mourer-Chauviré	Late Eocene	Phosphorites du Quercy, Escamps	France	A Todidae.	
Palaeotodus itardiensis	Valid	Sp. nov.	Cécile Mourer-Chauviré	Oligocene	Phosphorites du Quercy	France	A Todidae.	
Pandion lovensis	Valid	Sp. nov.	Jonathan J. Becker	Latest Clarendonian		USA	A Pandionidae.	
Pelecanoides cymatotrypetes	Valid	Sp. nov.	Storrs L. Olson	Early Pliocene	Varswater Formation	South Africa	A Pelecanoididae.	
Perdix margaritae	Valid	Sp. nov.	Evgeny N. Kurochkin	Miocene-Late Pliocene	Chikoi River	Soviet Union: Russia	A Phasianidae.	
Phalaropus eleonorae	Valid	Sp. nov.	Evgeny N. Kurochkin	Miocene-Late Pliocene		Mongolia	A Phalaropidae.	
Phasianus lufengia	Valid	Sp. nov.	Hou Lianhai	Late Miocene	Shihuiba	China	A Phasianidae.	
Podiceps solidus	Valid	Sp. nov.	Evgeny N. Kurochkin	Late Miocene; Early Pliocene	Hyargas-Nuur 2: MN 13; Chono-Harayah 1 and 2 Zogsoo-Harhan 1 and 4	Mongolia	A Podicipedidae.	
Pseudodontornis tenuirostris	Valid ?	Sp. nov.	Colin J. O. Harrison	Late Paleocene	Oldhaven Beds	UK: England	A Pseudontornithidae, possibly a synonymym of Pseudodontornis longidentata	
Siphonorhis daiquiri	Valid	Sp. nov.	Storrs L. Olson	Quaternary, probably Holocene	Cave deposits	Cuba	A Caprimulgidae, may still be living.	
Syrmaticus kozlovae	Valid	Sp. nov.	Evgeny N. Kurochkin	Miocene-Late Pliocene	Khirgis Nur Formation	Mongolia	A Phasianidae.	
Syrrhaptes kashini	Valid	Sp. nov.	Evgeny N. Kurochkin	Miocene-Late Pliocene		Mongolia	A Pteroclidae.	
Tadorna petrina	Valid	Sp. nov.	Evgeny N. Kurochkin	Late Pliocene		Mongolia	An Anatidae.	
Yunnanus gaoyuansis	Valid	Gen et Sp nov.	Hou Lianhai	Late Miocene	Shihuiba	China	A Passeriformes, family Incertae Sedis, this is the type species of the new genus.	

== Lepidosauromorphs ==
=== Newly named pleosiosaurs ===
Name	Novelty	Status	Authors	Age	Unit	Location	Notes	Images
Yuzhoupliosaurus	Gen et sp nov	Valid	Zhang	Middle Jurassic		China	A rhomaleosauride	

== Synapsids ==
=== Mammals ===
Name	Novelty	Status	Authors	Age	Unit	Location	Notes	Images
Ictonyx bolti	Sp. nov	Jr. synonym	Cooke	Late Pliocene-Early Pleistocene	Bolt's Farm	South Africa	A mustelid, reassigned to the genus Propoecilogale in 1987.	
