= Centropus colossus =

Centropus colossus Temporal range: Middle Pleistocene ?

Scientific classification
- Kingdom: Animalia
- Phylum: Chordata
- Class: Aves
- Order: Cuculiformes
- Family: Cuculidae
- Genus: Centropus
- Species: C. colossus

Binomial name
- Centropus colossus Baird, 1985

Extinct species of bird

Centropus colossus is an extinct species of coucal from the Middle Pleistocene or Late Pleistocene of Australia. It was described from submerged subfossil material collected from Fossil Cave in the south-east of South Australia. It was larger than any of its living congeners and was one of the largest cuckoos in the world.

== Discovery and naming ==
The first remains of Centropus colossus were discovered in 1979 by an expedition to Fossil Cave (formerly known as Green Waterhole Cave), which is 24 kilometres (15 mi) west of Mount Gambier, South Australia. They were subsequently described in 1985 by Robert Baird alongside other avian fossils from the same cave deposit. The holotype (SAM P24240) is a slightly damaged humerus. Additional remains were described in 2016. These include a damaged humerus and near complete femur. A second, slightly smaller femur was found within the Flinders University palaeontology collection while the publication was in press.

The specific epithet is derived from the Latin word colossus, in reference to its great size.

== Description ==
The humerus of Centropus colossus has a backwards facing shaft and a cranioventrally facing head. The pronounced notch on the humeral head (incisura capitis) is wide and positioned more proximodistally compared to other species of coucal. A large ventral tubercule is present on the proximal surface of the humerus. In addition, it also possesses a small pneumotricipital fossa. The deltopectoral crest is short and robust. On the back side of the distal end of the deltopectoral crest is the impression for the pectoral muscle, which is reduced to a prominent scar. The dorsal supracondylar process is low and rounded. A swollen corpus is present near the fossa for the brachialis muscle. The process serving as the attachment point for the flexor carpi ulnaris muscle at the distal end of the humerus (processus flexorius) is dorsoventrally wide.

Its femur differs from that of the extant pheasant coucal by having a more straighter and thicker shaft, and a proportionally larger femoral head. In addition, both the medial and lateral condyles are proportionally deeper and wider.

Shute et al. (2016) used a variety of methods the estimate the weight of Centropus colossus. They found that it had a body mass range of 1-2.3 kg (2.2-5 lbs), making it one of the largest species of coucal. However, it was slightly smaller than Centropus maximus.

== Classification and evolution ==
In their 2016 study, Shute and colleagues performed a cladistic analysis using the matrix data from Hughes (2000). After including all cuculid taxa (both living and extinct), it yielded poorly resolved results. Centropus colossus, along with all other Australian fossil coucals, didn't join any clade within the polytomy. The authors subsequently added C. colossus individually into the matrix, which produced similar results. Its poor resolution was said to be caused by the lack of material, and was excluded from further analyses.

Coucals were possibly part of a faunal interchange with Australia, arriving sometime during the Miocene or Early Pleistocene through Papua New Guinea. They likely dispersed into south-eastern, as well as south-western, Australia through vegetation corridors.

== Paleobiology ==
Centropus colossus is thought to have been either flightless or, at least, having reduced flight capability. This is due to the humerus having reduced areas for the attachment of flight muscles. In addition, C. colossus also shows adaptations towards a greater use of its legs in locomotion, as indicated by the femur being large and robust, and possessing a strongly developed trochanter. Like modern coucal species, it probably preferred to live in dense understories.

== Paleoecology ==
=== Paleoenvironment ===
The only known fossils of C. colossus originate from a water-filled cave deposit in south-eastern South Australia known as Fossil Cave. The exact age of the site remains uncertain, but it is probably either Middle or Late Pleistocene. At the time of deposition, the area surrounding the cave would have been covered with Casuarina-dominated woodlands and Melaleuca thickets, which would have created a dense canopy.

Fossil Cave preserves a diverse assemblage of birds including falcons, rails, pigeons, cockatoos, parrots, kingfishers, swallows, logrunners (such as the extinct Orthonyx hypsilophus), honeyeaters and ravens. Mammal fossils are also abundant at the site. Macropods are well-represented, with remains of both modern species such as the eastern grey kangaroo (Macropus giganteus), red-necked wallaby (Notamacropus rufogriseus), and swamp wallaby (Wallabia bicolor), and those of extinct forms such as the toolache wallaby (Notamacropus greyi), "Procoptodon" gilli and Simosthenurus occidentalis having been found. Mammalian carnivores are represented at this site by the tiger quoll (Dasyurus maculatus), thylacine (Thylacinus cynocephalus) and Thylacoleo carnifex. Other mammals known from Fossil Cave include the southern brown bandicoot (Isoodon obesulus), koala (Phascolarctos cinereus), common wombat (Vombatus ursinus) and common brushtail possum (Trichosurus vulpecula).

=== Taphonomy ===
A vast majority of fossils collected from Fossil Cave were discovered associated or semi-articulated, which implies that they experienced no disturbances whilst down there. For this to have happened, water would have to be the mode of accumulation. It is thought that birds, like Centropus colossus, entered the cave in search of water and drowned as a result of trying to land on floating debris not capable of keeping them afloat.
