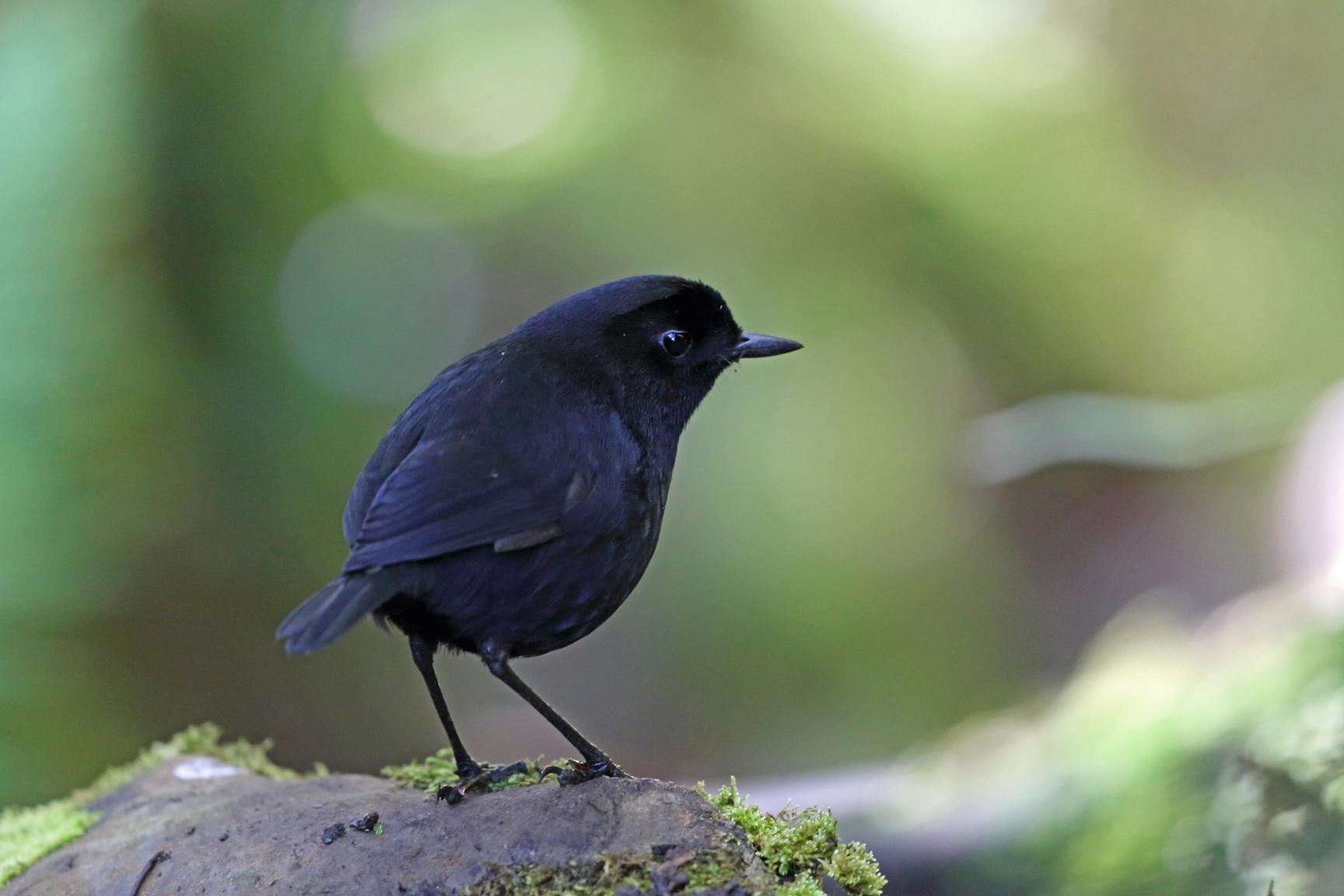

Conservation status
- Least Concern (IUCN 3.1)

Scientific classification
- Kingdom: Animalia
- Phylum: Chordata
- Class: Aves
- Order: Passeriformes
- Family: Melampittidae
- Genus: Melampitta; Schlegel, 1871
- Species: M. lugubris

Binomial name
- Melampitta lugubris Schlegel, 1871

Subspecies
- Melampitta lugubris longicauda Melampitta lugubris lugubris Melampitta lugubris rostrata

= Lesser melampitta =

Species of bird

The lesser melampitta (Melampitta lugubris) is a medium-sized enigmatic terrestrial songbird of mountain forests of New Guinea. It is the only species in the genus Melampitta. It is now classified (with the greater melampitta) in the family Melampittidae, but in some other sources it is variously considered close to or in the Orthonychidae (logrunners), Paradisaeidae (birds of paradise), Corcoracidae (Australian mud-nesters), Cnemophilidae (satinbirds) or Monarchidae (monarch flycatchers).

A local name, used by the Ketengban people of the Jayawijaya Mountains, is golík.

It is approximately 18 cm long and has an all-black plumage with long legs and short tail. Both sexes are almost similar, distinguished by the color of the iris. The male has crimson red iris while the female's are dark brown.

The lesser melampitta builds dome-like nest in the forests. The diet consists mainly of insects.

Widespread and a common species throughout its habitat range, the lesser melampitta is evaluated as least concern on the IUCN Red List of Threatened Species.
