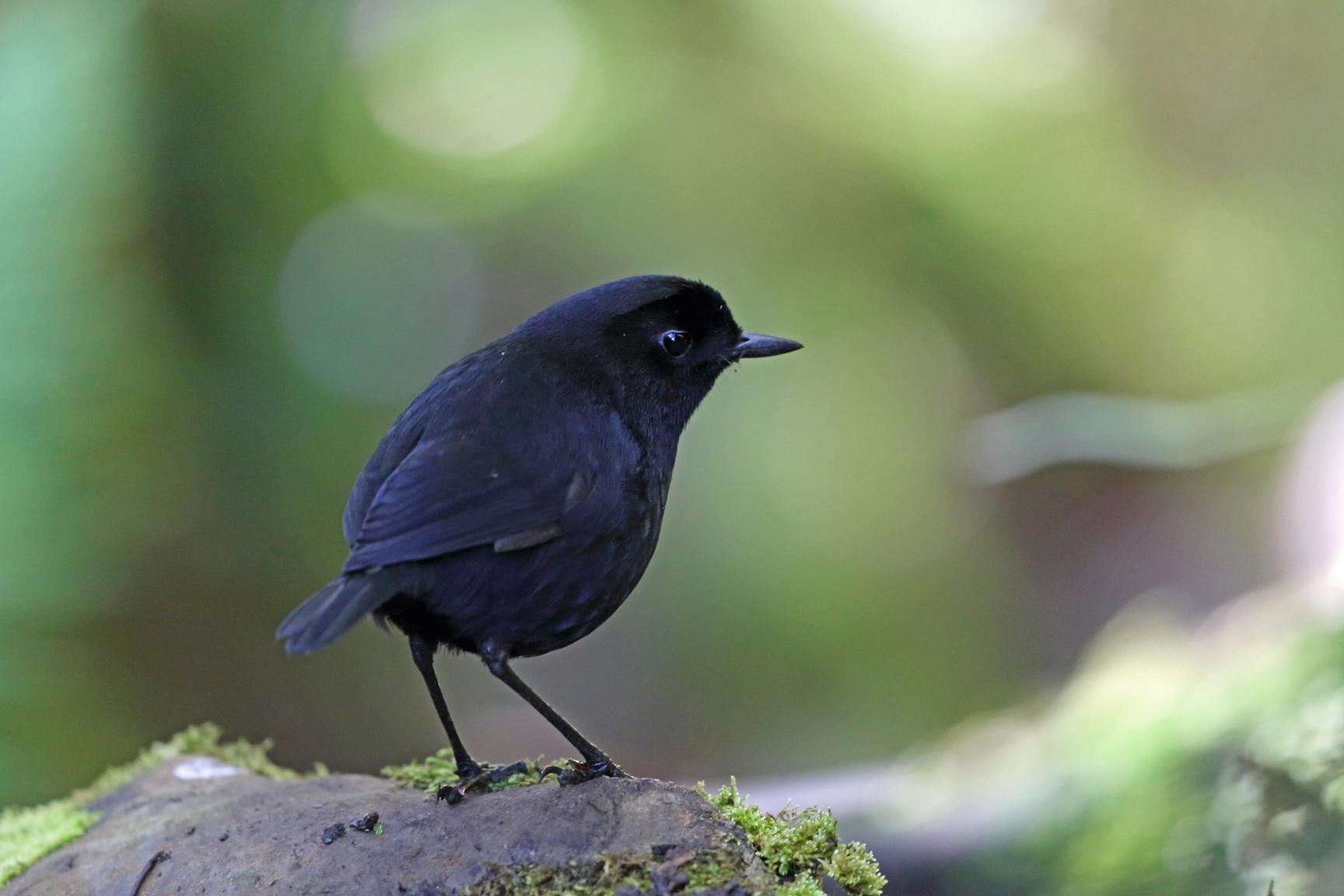
- Lesser melampitta (Melampitta lugubris)

Scientific classification
- Kingdom: Animalia
- Phylum: Chordata
- Class: Aves
- Order: Passeriformes
- Superfamily: Corvoidea
- Family: Melampittidae; Schodde & Christidis, 2014

Genera
- Megalampitta; Melampitta

= Melampitta =

Family of birds

The melampittas are a family, Melampittidae, of New Guinean passerine birds containing two enigmatic species. The two species are found in two genera, the greater melampitta in the genus Megalampitta and the lesser melampitta in the genus Melampitta. They are little studied and before being established as a family in 2014 their taxonomic relationships with other birds were uncertain, being considered at one time related variously to the pittas, Old World babblers and birds-of-paradise.

These are small to medium-sized birds with black plumage, strong legs and short, rounded wings. Mostly terrestrial, they live in montane forest. The greater melampitta has more specific habitat needs, needing limestone karst where it is thought to roost and nest in limestone sinkholes. Insects and small vertebrates are taken from the forest leaf litter. Little is known about their breeding behaviour, with only the nests of the lesser melampitta having been seen by scientists. While the greater melampitta is not generally common, neither species is thought to be declining due to human activities, and both species are considered to be safe from extinction by the International Union for Conservation of Nature.

== Taxonomy ==
The taxonomic placement of the melampittas was the source of long-standing confusion. Based on its superficial resemblance to the suboscine pittas (plump bodies, short tails and long legs), Hermann Schlegel placed the lesser melampitta within that family when he described that species in 1871. The name melampitta is derived from the Ancient Greek melas- for "black" with the genus name "Pitta". As Ernst Mayr demonstrated that the structure of the syrinx was that of an oscine bird, the genus was later moved to the Old World babblers (an infamous "taxonomic dustbin"), then with the jewel-babblers and whipbirds, which have been placed in both the Orthonychidae or the Eupetidae (but are now in their own family, Cinclosomatidae).

Based on the analysis of DNA–DNA hybridization data the genus was placed with the Paradisaeidae birds of paradise by Charles Sibley and Jon E. Ahlquist. Frith and Frith felt these conclusions were not supported by aspects of the behaviour and biology (although they argued it may have been related to the Cnemophilidae birds of paradise, which had then recently been split from the main family). More recent studies have refuted the relationship with the whipbirds and jewel-babblers, and instead consistently shown a relationship as the sister taxa to a group of families including the drongos, fantails, monarch flycatchers, Corcoracidae (the white-winged chough and apostlebird of Australia) and the birds of paradise again. The fact that the melampittas do not closely resemble these families (except the Corcoracidae and to a lesser extent the birds of paradise) may be due to adaptations to terrestrial living, compared to the other families which are mostly arboreal. Given the distinctiveness of the two melampittas it was suggested that the genus be placed in its own family, and a new family, Melampittidae, was formally erected in 2014 by Richard Schodde and Leslie Christidis.

While most researchers also accepted that the two species are congeneric (are both in the same genus), the two species do have a number of differences, particularly size, tail length and calls. In 2014, in the same paper that established the family, Schodde and Christidis moved the greater melampitta into its own genus Megalampitta. Although the name was created to invoke the Greek mega for large and Melampitta for the genus, the authors of the paper stated that, per the Code for Nomenclature, it should be treated a random collection of letters. The authors also noted that it is possible that the two species may be separated into two families in the future.

The greater melampitta is monotypic, meaning it has no subspecies. The lesser melampitta has had three subspecies described, distinguished by slight differences in measurements, and some authorities have also treated it as monotypic. A study published in 2024 confirmed that the greater melampitta is indeed monotypic, with all birds forming a single population, even though they have a highly dispersed population. The lesser melampitta showed deep divisions between the three populations, leading the researchers to suggest that it may represent three different species.

== Distribution and habitat ==
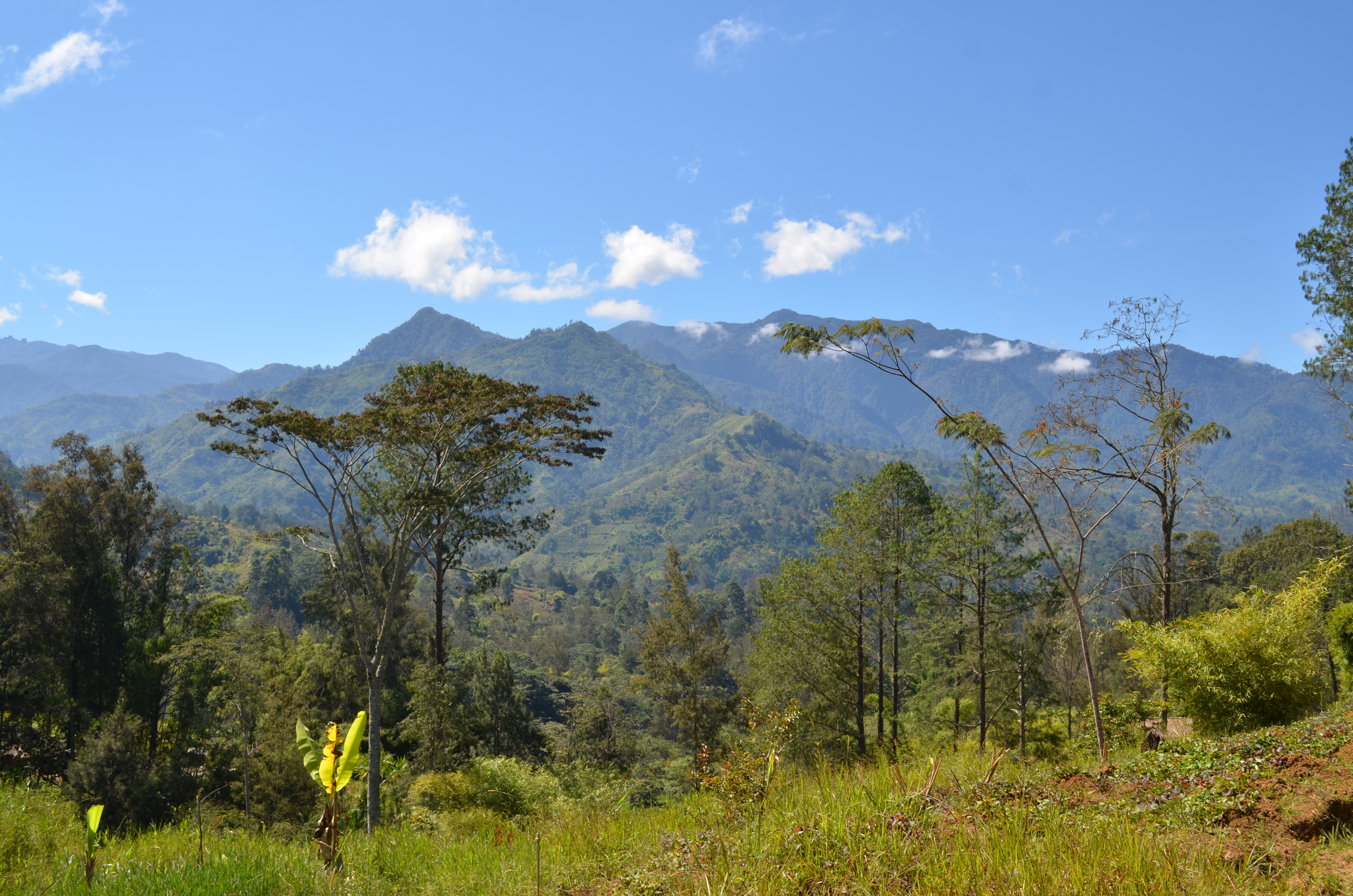
The melampittas are found in the highlands of New Guinea

The melampittas are birds of the New Guinean rainforest, and are generally montane species as well. The upper limit of the range of the lesser melampitta reaches as high as 3,500 m (11,500 ft), although it is most commonly found between 2,000 to 2,800 m (6,600–9,200 ft), where it is found in around watercourses and other damp areas. The greater melampitta is restricted to areas of rugged limestone karst with sinkholes that it apparently roosts and even nests in. In the Kumawa Mountains Jared Diamond found that that species inhabited a range of 650 to 1,400 m (2,130–4,590 ft). Both species have a discontinuous distribution across New Guinea, with the valleys between the highland ranges creating sky islands. The greater melampitta in particular is seldom encountered by scientists because its karst habitat is rarely visited due to the difficult terrain.

The distribution of the lesser melampitta is consistent with the usual pattern found in birds in New Guinea, a biogeographical phenomenon known as taxon cycles where highlands act as refugia for older taxa of birds. The distribution of the greater melampitta is harder to explain, as it is also an ancient species, but is found at lower altitudes. The populations of greater melampitta are also more isolated from each other, but the species lacks the genetic differentiation between these populations that would be expected given this isolation and the poor dispersal ability of the species.

== Description ==
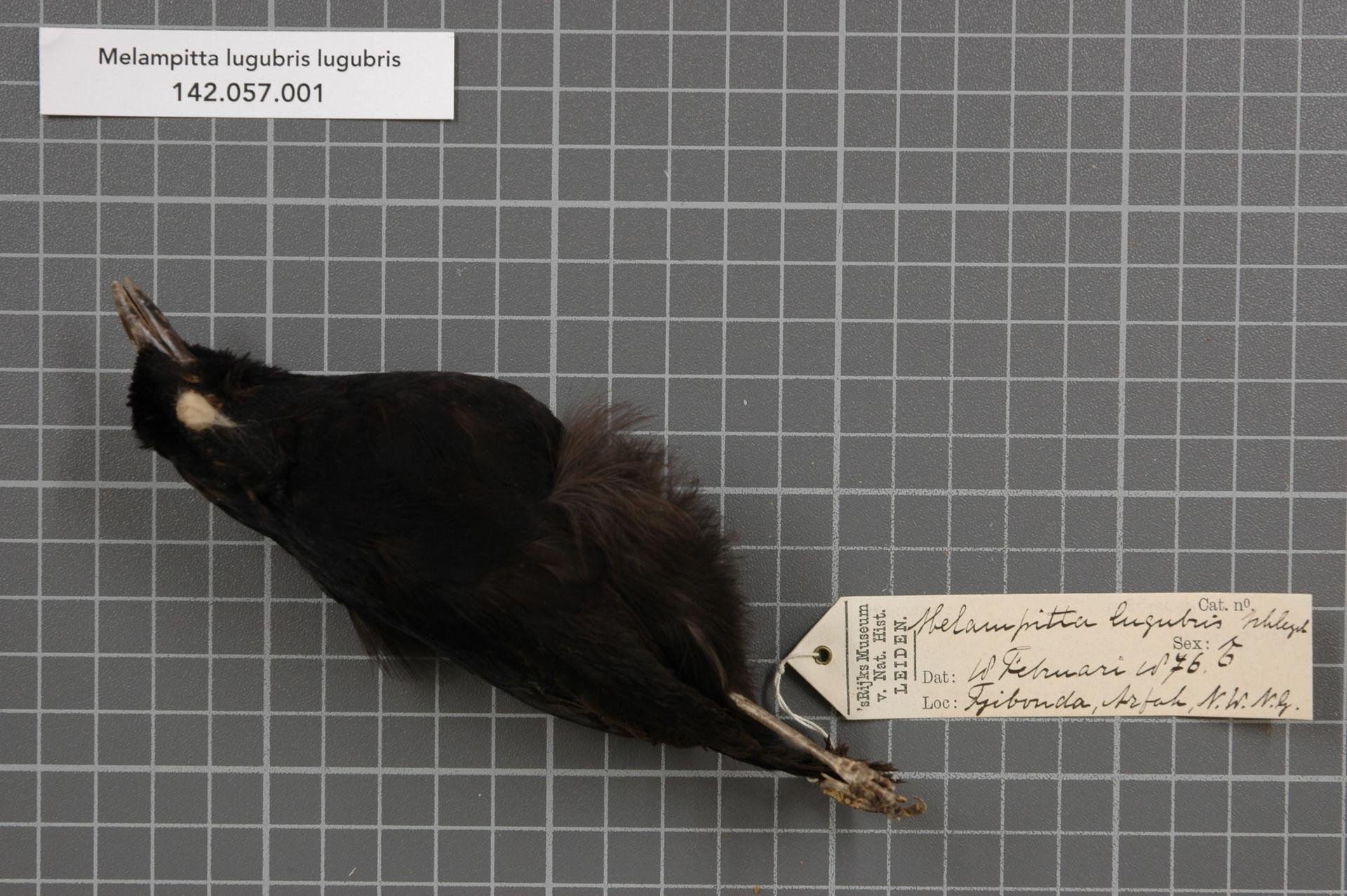
Study skin of nominate race of lesser melampitta showing black plumage

The two melampittas are small terrestrial birds that have black plumage and strong long legs and large strong feet. The wings are short and rounded, and the primary feathers are uniquely recurved and emarginated. The feathers of the forecrown are erectile. The lesser melampitta is around 18 cm (7.1 in) long and weighs around 30 g (1.1 oz) , whereas the greater melampitta is larger and considerably heavier at around 29 cm (11 in) in length and weighs 205 g (7.2 oz). The bill is black in both species, and that of the greater melampitta is also larger and more heavy than that of the lesser melampitta, and is hooked. There is some variation in the family in the tails. The tail of the greater melampitta has strengthened remiges and retriges, which are often worn, a possible adaptation to its habit of roosting in limestone sinkholes. Those sinkholes are too deep and narrow to fly directly out and the tail may be used to help cling to the side of the hole as it exits, in the fashion of a woodpecker. The tail of that species is long, whereas the tail of the lesser melampitta is short; in both species end of the tail is rounded.

The plumage and general appearance of both sexes in both species are almost identical, with the only difference between sexes being the iris colour in the lesser melampitta, the male having a red iris and the female a brown one. The plumage of adults in both species is black. The plumage of juvenile lesser melampittas is the same as adults except they are brown on the lower body. Juvenile plumage of greater melampitta varies from that of adults in having russet backs and bellies. Several researchers have noted that this resembles the plumage of the hooded pitohui. Hooded pitohuis are unusual for birds in having a toxin, homobatrachotoxin, in their feathers and skin which can cause convulsions and death if consumed. The resemblance is probably an example of Batesian mimicry as the greater melampitta is not itself poisonous.

== Behaviour ==
The greater melampitta is reported to be very shy and wary, but also inquisitive and may approach people sitting quietly to investigate. It is usually revealed by its calls, and can be very difficult to locate if it is not calling. The lesser melampitta is also described as hard to see but not shy. While hopping on the ground foraging it will frequently flutter its wings and lift its tail. Both species move around on the ground by hopping.

=== Vocalisations ===
The calls of the two species are not similar. The call of the greater melampitta is a double or triple note, which is slurred and repeated monotonously, and is reminiscent of the black pitohui. The call of the lesser melampitta are either harsh buzzy notes or chirped whistles, both of which are repeated at intervals.

=== Diet and feeding ===
The melampittas are insectivores, although in the case of the greater melampitta, this statement is inference as their diet isn't described. All that is known is that it inhabits the ground and understory. The lesser melampitta feeds on insects, including beetles and caterpillars, as well as worms, snails, small frogs and even small fruit. It forages on the ground, probing through leaves by probing and flipping them with its bill.

=== Breeding ===
The breeding behaviour of the melampittas is only known in any detail for the lesser melampitta. All that is known of the breeding of the greater melampitta are reports from local people that it builds a nest that is a basket of vines suspended in the limestone sinkholes that it roosts in. There is also some evidence that it may be territorial.

The lesser melampitta is known to start nesting in the dry season and continue into the beginning of the wet. The nest is a closed dome shape constructed out of live green moss. This makes the melampittas the only bird family in the core Corvoidea that have domed nests instead of cup nests, which is a reversal of that group's evolution of cup nests from dome-nesting passerine ancestors. The nest that has been described was found 2 m (6.6 ft) from the ground on the side of a tree fern, with nesting material woven into the bark and attached to dead fronds of the tree fern to secure it. Both parents will approach their nest on foot, only flying up to the nest when directly below it, but on leaving they will fly 10 to 15 m (33–49 ft) before landing on the ground. The species has also been recording chasing grey-streaked honeyeaters away from their nests. The female lays a single chalky white and slightly speckled egg, which measures 27.7 mm to 30.2 mm × 22.6 mm to 23.9 mm (1.09 in–1.19 in × 0.89 in–0.94 in), and undertakes all the incubation duties. The incubation is quite long for a small passerine, lasting around 27 days, during which the male will feed the female. Both sexes feed the single chick, which is hatched covered in downy feathers. Unlike their relatives in the birds of paradise family, which feed their chicks by regurgitation, the parents feed the chick whole food that has not been swallowed. The chick takes up to 35 days to fledge, a long time for passerines.

== Status ==
Neither species of melampitta are believed to be threatened with extinction. The greater melampitta is not generally common across New Guinea, but appears to be relatively common in its preferred habitat type when that habitat is studied. The lesser melampitta is less restricted in its habitat requirements and is common over a large area. During a camera-trapping study of ground birds undertaken in central New Guinea the lesser melampitta was the second most commonly photographed species of bird after the New Guinea woodcock. Because of this, and the fact that their habitat is not considered to be threatened and their populations are considered to be stable, both species are listed as least concern by the International Union for Conservation of Nature.
