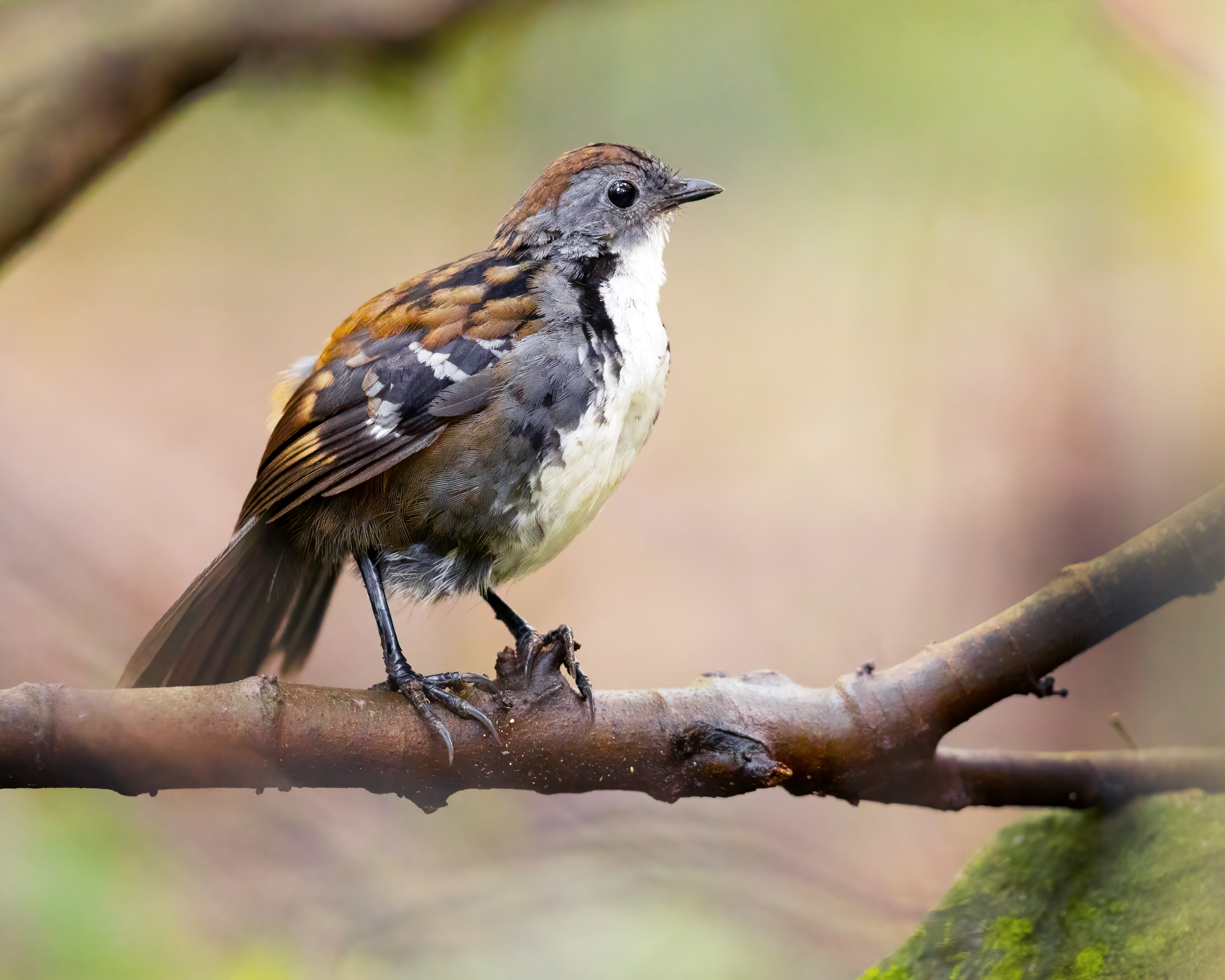
- male
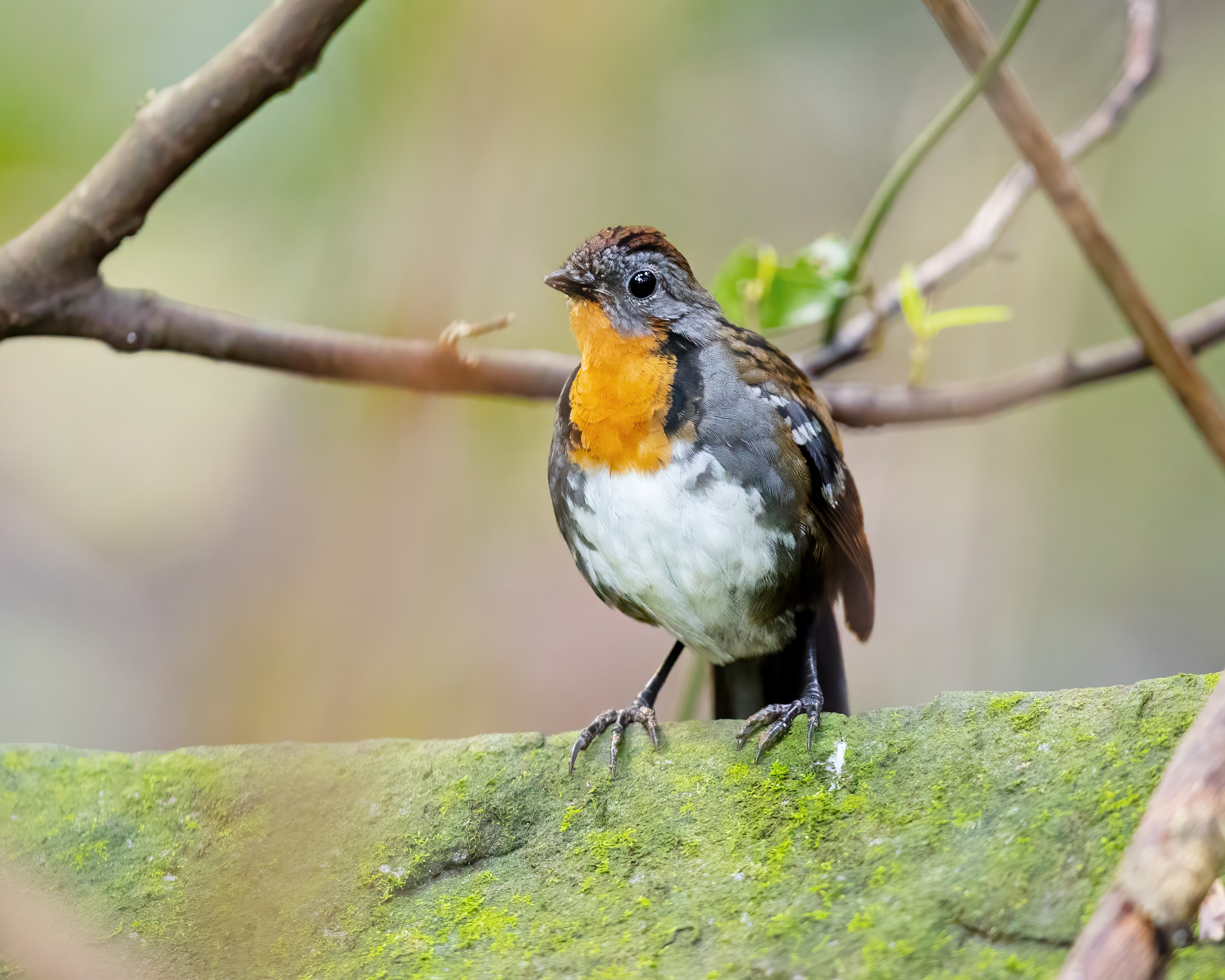
- female

Conservation status
- Least Concern (IUCN 3.1)

Scientific classification
- Kingdom: Animalia
- Phylum: Chordata
- Class: Aves
- Order: Passeriformes
- Family: Orthonychidae
- Genus: Orthonyx
- Species: O. temminckii

Binomial name
- Orthonyx temminckii Ranzani, 1822

= Australian logrunner =

Species of bird

The Australian logrunner (Orthonyx temminckii) is a species of bird that is endemic to eastern Australia where it uses unique foraging techniques and adaptations to search for its food on the floors of temperate, subtropical, or tropical moist lowland forests in south-eastern Australia. Until 2002, it was widely considered to be conspecific with the New Guinea logrunner, but studies showed the two differ significantly, both genetically and vocally.

It is known by a number of common names including spine-tailed logrunner, spine-tail, logrunner, scrub quail and chowcilla.

== Systematics ==
The Australian logrunner is a Passeriform in the family Orthonychidae. It is one of only three species within the Orthonyx genus; the other two are the chowcilla (Orthonyx spaldingii) from northern Queensland and the New Guinean logrunner (Orthonyx novaeguineae) from Papua New Guinea.

== Description ==
Logrunners as a group are characterised by their distinctive tail feathers where the rachis (or central shafts) of the tail feathers protrude and are stiffened. The broad tail of the bird is less than four inches (10 cm) in length and the strong protruding rachis at the ends of the tail feathers are almost void of the usual barbs, giving the feather the appearance of spines. This appearance gives rise to some of the common names for the bird such as spine-tail or spine-tailed logrunner.

There appears to be some debate about the number of tail feathers possessed by the Australian logrunner. For example, some references state that the logrunner only has 10 tail feathers whilst other references describe the bird as having 12 tail feathers. Most birds are described as having 12 tail feathers but there are notable exceptions to this.

The logrunner is not unique in having atypical tail feather structures. Other birds, such as the greater melampitta (Melampitta gigantea), also have spiny and stiffened tail feathers, but not to the same extent as the logrunner. Birds such as creepers, woodpeckers, swifts and penguins are also known to use their modified tail feathers as braces and supports.

The logrunner's head and back are a reddish-brown colour; the wings are mainly black; and the tail is dark brown. The wing-coverts are tipped with grey and the eyebrow and ear-coverts grey. The throat, breast and abdomen feathers are white. In the female, the throat is an orange-rufous colour. The male is also larger than the female.

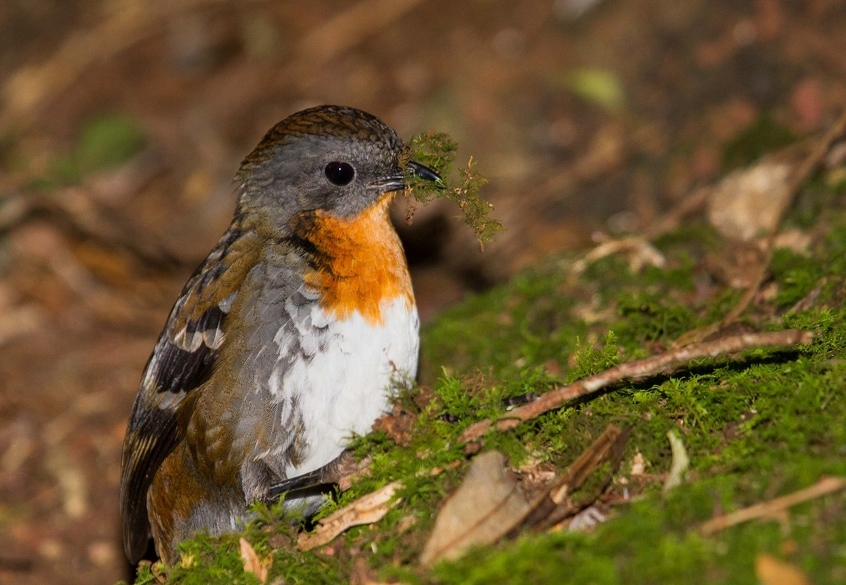
A female logrunner collecting moss during construction of a nest

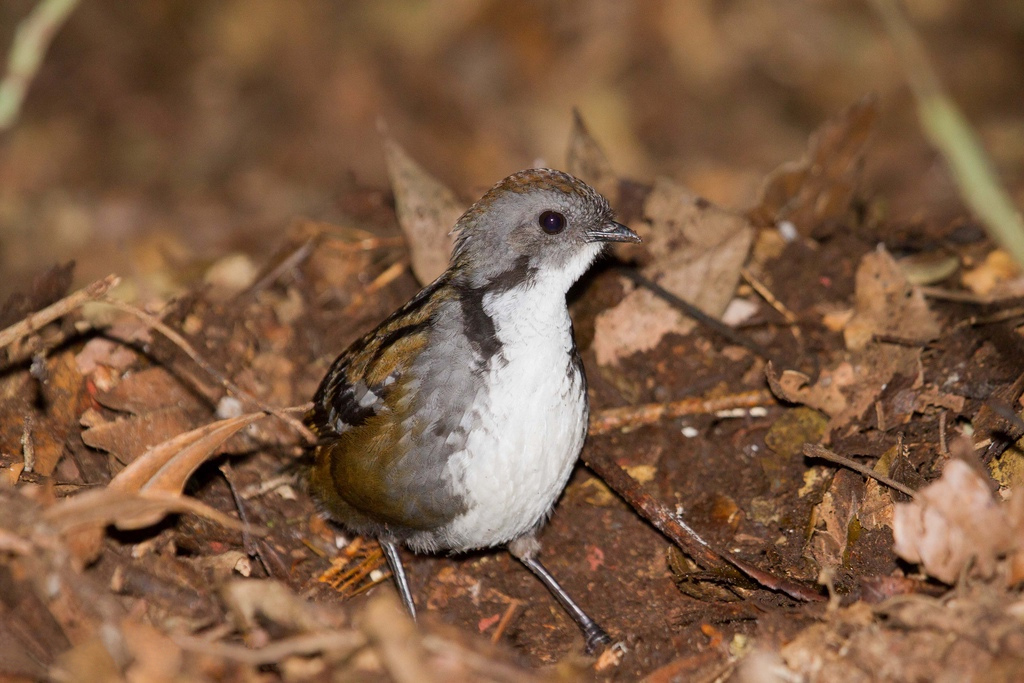
A male logrunner foraging on the forest floor

== Distribution and habitat ==
The Australian logrunner is found in South Eastern Australia from the Illawarra district in NSW to the Bunya Mountains in Queensland. Its preferred habitat is characterised by the leafy floor of rainforests, rich with scattered logs, forest debris, ferns, vines and saplings.

== Behaviour ==
The most characteristic behaviour of the logrunner is its foraging technique that involves the bird propping against its spiny tail and then scrapping or throwing leaf debris aside with its feet. Once the larger debris is removed, logrunners then use their tail as a brace and scratch the exposed soil looking for food. This scratching leaves 'soup-plate' depressions in the debris that are about 150 mm in diameter.

The sideways sweeping action of the legs whilst foraging is unique to logrunners and is possible due to the distinctive structure of the logrunner's pelvis and hind legs. The pelvis is short and broad and the femur is stout with strongly developed projections that support the attachment of the strong muscles needed to support its foraging technique.

Logrunners are described as noisy birds with performances of loud songs and calls, especially in the mornings. These songs and calls are believed to have either a territorial or sexual function.

== Diet ==
The logrunner diet consists mainly of insects and other invertebrates uncovered via foraging on the forest floor.

== Social organisation and reproduction ==
Logrunners live in pairs or in small groups and defend their territory aggressively from neighbouring birds. They are believed to form monogamous and permanent bonds.

The female lays two eggs that are approximately 29 mm × 24 mm (1.1 in × 0.9 in) in size. The eggs are white in colour and have an oval shape. The incubation period for the eggs is between 20 and 25 days.

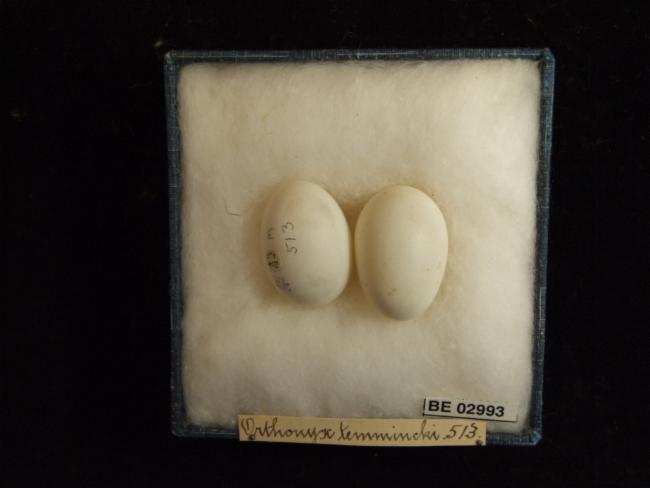
A pair of eggs from the Australian logrunner

There appears to be some difference across references with respect to when the logrunner breeds. For example, some state that the bird breeds between April and October, others state that this occurs usually between May and August, whilst others state that breeding can occur at any time but usually between July and December.

The eggs are laid in a large, domed nest with a ramp. It is formed with sticks, ferns, leaves and natural fibres and is generally covered with green moss. The nests are lined with smaller material and leaves. They are generally constructed against a stone or log, or in a in tree buttress, but nests are also sometimes constructed in dense forest vines or ferns close to the ground. There appears to be some variety in the construction material and appearance of logrunner nests.

Logrunners conceal their nests by placing leaves and sticks from the surrounding environment on top of the nest, as well as building a hood over the entrance to the nest with mosses also collected from nearby.

The process of building the nest has been observed in some detail and involves:

- Initially laying down a foundation platform of up to 50 mm of short and strong dry sticks
- Then using short strong sticks to build up around the sides and back of the platform and curved in over the top to form a roof
- The roof and walls are then covered with dry leaves and moss to a thickness of around 25 mm
- Concealment is further improved by placing dry leaves and twigs on top of the moss roof
- The moss roof is extended and slopes towards the front of the nest to form a hood or awning over the entrance (almost concealing the entrance)
- Finally, the inside of the nest is lined with dry vegetation such as bark, dry moss and fern fibre.

Nest construction is performed by the female and she is solely responsible for incubating the eggs which takes between 20–25 days. The female is also responsible for rearing the young until they leave the nest which takes between 16–19 days. Both male and female appear to share responsibility for feeding the young after they leave the nest.

== Sources ==
- del Hoyo, J.; Elliot, A. & Christie D. (editors). (2006). Handbook of the Birds of the World. Volume 12: Picathartes to Tits and Chickadees. Lynx Editions. ISBN 978-84-96553-42-2
- THE ATLAS OF LIVING AUSTRALIA. (2015). Orthonyx temminckii : Australian Logrunner.
- Data related to Orthonyx temminckii at Wikispecies
