= Cuban pauraque =

Cuban pauraque Temporal range: Early Holocene

Scientific classification
- Kingdom: Animalia
- Phylum: Chordata
- Class: Aves
- Order: Caprimulgiformes
- Family: Caprimulgidae
- Genus: Siphonorhis
- Species: †S. daiquiri

Binomial name
- †Siphonorhis daiquiri Olson, 1985

Extinct species of bird

The Cuban pauraque (Siphonorhis daiquiri), also known as the Cuban poorwill, is an extinct species of nightjar from the island of Cuba in the Caribbean.

== History ==
It was described by Storrs Olson in 1985 from subfossil material he collected in 1980 from a hillside cave overlooking the village, and former historic port, of Daiquirí, about 20 km east of the city of Santiago de Cuba. The specific epithet refers to the type locality.

== Description ==
The species was intermediate in size between its two known congeners, being larger than S. brewsteri of Hispaniola and smaller than S. americana of Jamaica. Olson considered that the cave deposits of the pauraque and other contemporary fauna were the prey of barn owls and were of Holocene age. Because of the cryptic nature of pauraques and other nightjars, Olson considered it possible that the species might not be extinct, though there have been no confirmed records of living birds.
