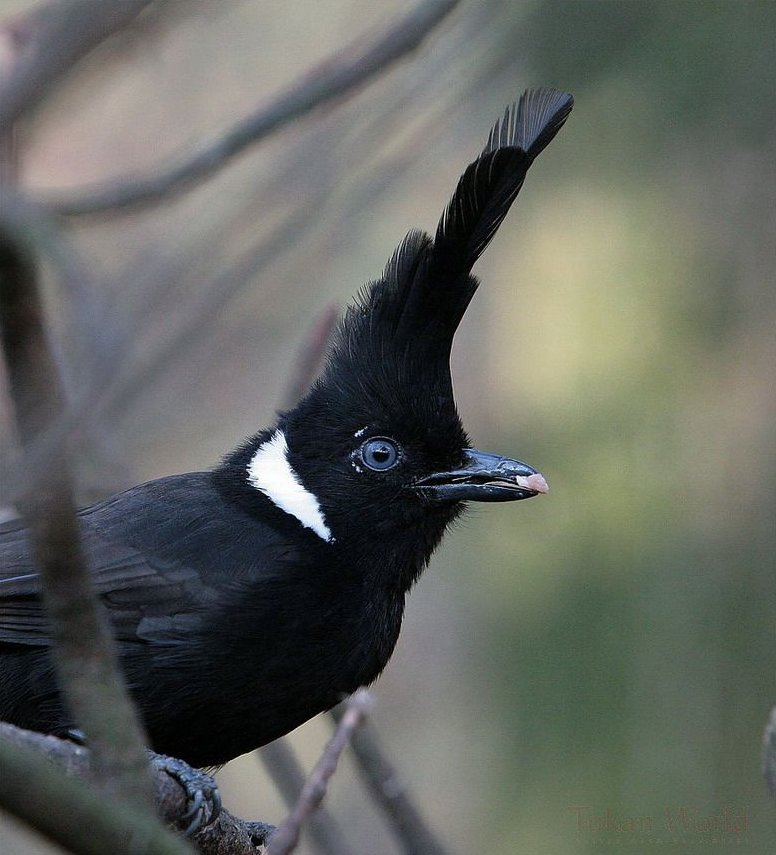

Conservation status
- Near Threatened (IUCN 3.1)

Scientific classification
- Kingdom: Animalia
- Phylum: Chordata
- Class: Aves
- Order: Passeriformes
- Superfamily: Corvoidea
- Family: Platylophidae; Gaudin et al., 2021
- Genus: Platylophus; Swainson, 1832
- Species: P. galericulatus

Binomial name
- Platylophus galericulatus (Cuvier, 1816)

= Crested jayshrike =

Species of bird from tropical east Asia

The crested jayshrike or crested shrikejay (Platylophus galericulatus), formerly known as the crested jay (despite not being a true jay), is a species of bird found in Brunei, Indonesia, Malaysia, Myanmar, and Thailand. It is the only member of the genus Platylophus and the family Platylophidae.

Although traditionally placed in the family Corvidae, its taxonomy has been under contention since the 2000s, as phylogenetic analyses indicate that it is not a true corvid, but rather a basal member of the Corvoidea radiation. Some authorities have suggested that it may belong to the helmetshrikes. In 2019, eBird and the Clements Checklist renamed the species the crested shrikejay and placed it in its own family, the Platylophidae, which was undescribed at the time. In 2021, the family Platylophidae was officially described, and in 2022 the International Ornithological Congress reclassified the species into Platylophidae. However, the family name Lophocittidae, originally described as Lophocitteae in 1855 by Johann Jakob Kaup, may have referred to the crested shrikejay, and if so would take precedence over Platylophidae.

Its natural habitats are subtropical or tropical moist lowland forest and subtropical or tropical moist montane forest of the Thai-Malay Peninsula, Sumatra, Java, and Borneo. It is threatened by habitat loss from illegal logging and land conversion for farming, as well as wildfires and capture for the wildlife trade. Research conducted by a team led by EcoVerde Global Consulting found that the crested jayshrike is used as a “master bird” to train other songbird species. Despite it receiving legal protection in Indonesia in 2018, the trade in the bird markets remained open and the number of individuals for the species remained unchanged over a 15 year period

== Vocalization ==
Its alarm call is distinctive, and has been compared to a machine gun.

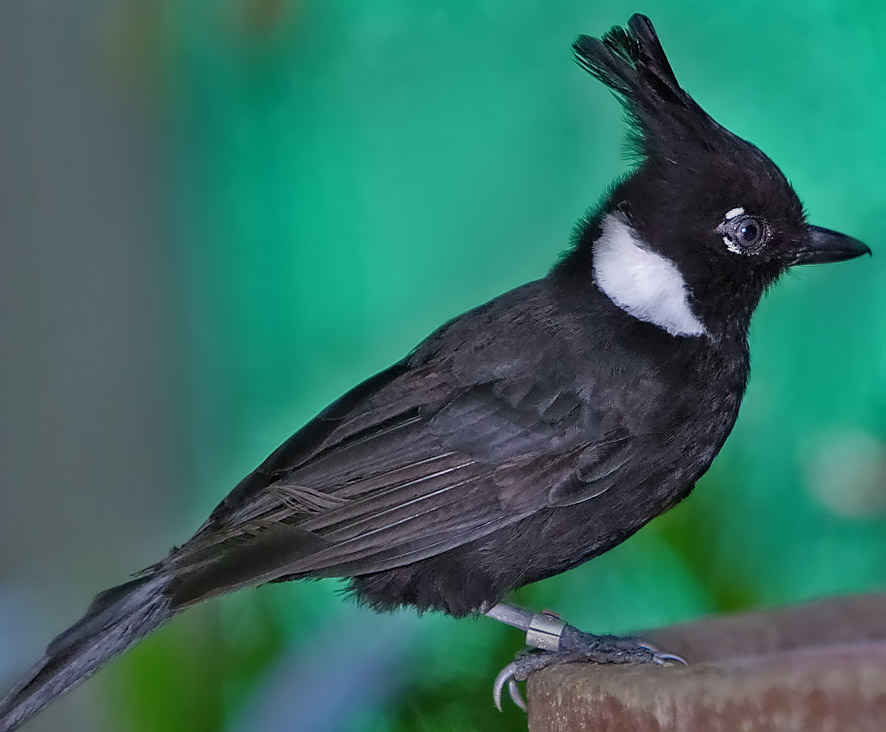
At Jurong BirdPark, Singapore
