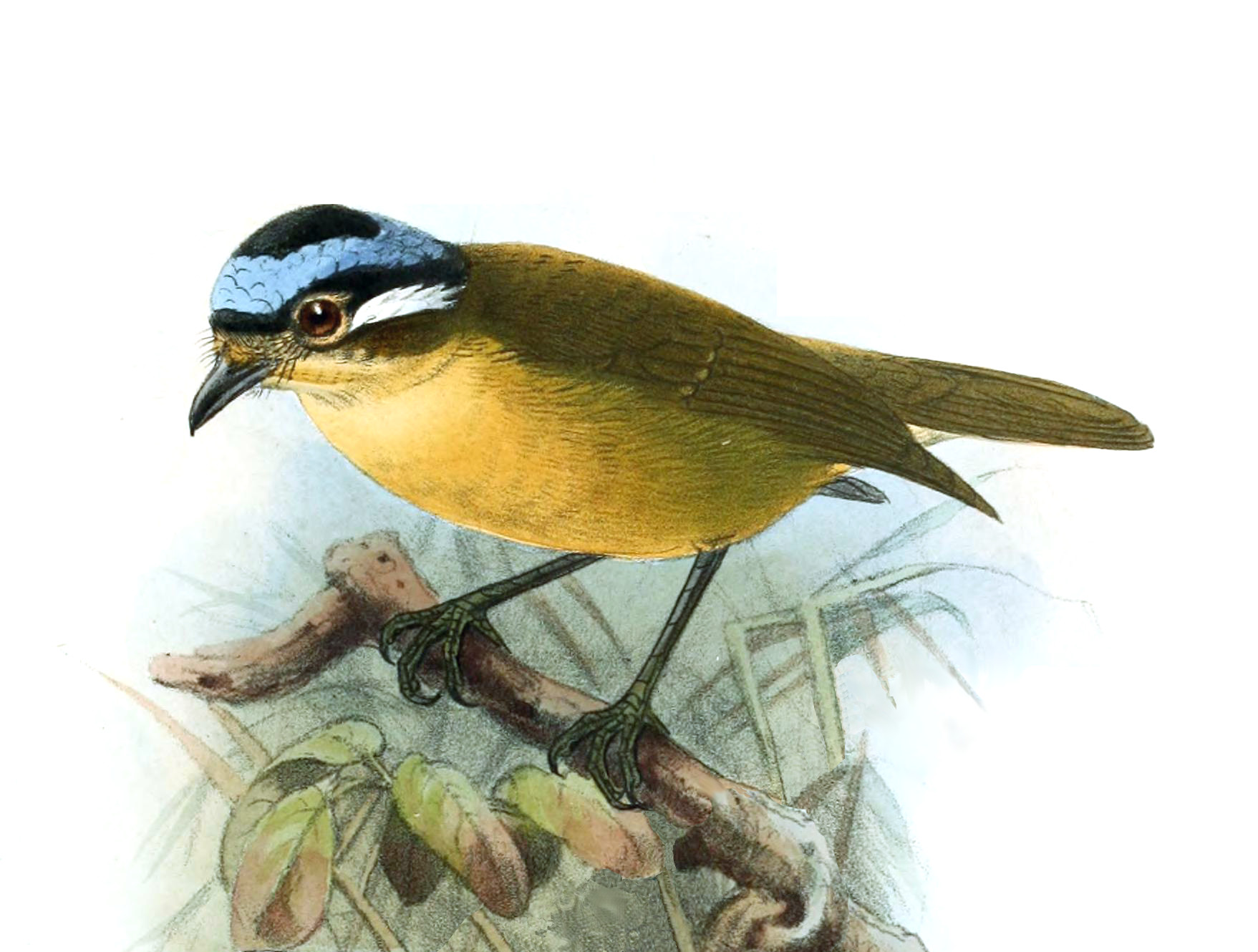

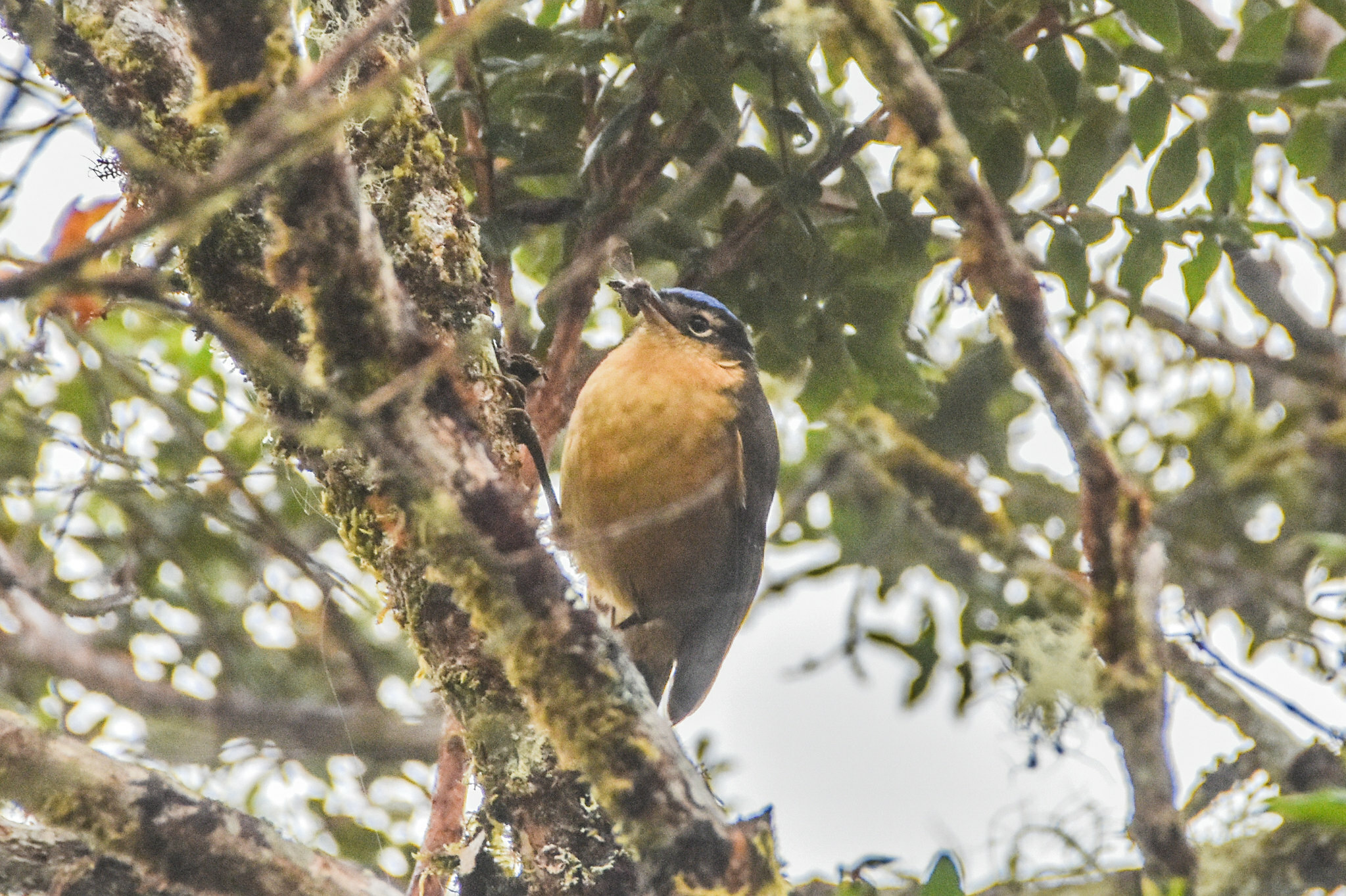

Conservation status
- Least Concern (IUCN 3.1)

Scientific classification
- Kingdom: Animalia
- Phylum: Chordata
- Class: Aves
- Order: Passeriformes
- Superfamily: Corvoidea
- Family: Ifritidae; Schodde & Christidis, 2014
- Genus: Ifrita; Rothschild, 1898
- Species: I. kowaldi

Binomial name
- Ifrita kowaldi (De Vis, 1890)

= Blue-capped ifrit =

Species of bird

The blue-capped ifrit (Ifrita kowaldi) is a species of small passerine bird in the monotypic family Ifritidae, native to the montane rainforests of New Guinea. These birds are insectivorous and are notable for their distinctive blue crown and presence of batrachotoxin, a potent neurotoxin, in their feathers and skin. This chemical defense is believed to come from their diet, particularly Choresine beetles. Blue-capped ifrits are non-aggressive and typically found in small groups within high altitude forest habitats. Although they are currently listed as of least concern by the IUCN, their population is slowly declining due to habitat disturbance and limited conservation measures.

== Description ==
The blue-capped ifrit is 16–17 cm (6.5–6.5 in) long and weighs 34–36 g (1.2–1.3 oz). The bird shows brown upperparts (top side of the bird including head, back, wings, and tail) with finely dotted wing edges and light-yellow underparts (the underside of bird, including belly, throat, chest, and under the wings and tail).

The head is marked with a bright blue cap outlined in black, a small black spot on the crown, and a long white stripe running besides the eye. A thin black strip is within this strip, and the eye itself is encircled by a narrow white ring.

Ifrits tend to have stout body shapes with broad chests. Their wings are short and rounded while their legs are booted, having feathers down to their stout and clawed feet.

The species is sexually dimorphic, with ear streak coloration being white in males and more tawny yellow in females. Males also have darker markings around the eyes and have more vivid coloration on the head and neck; females have paler markings around the eyes, and juveniles resemble females but have a light brown forehead.

== Taxonomy ==
The blue-capped ifrit (Ifrita kowaldi) is the sole member of the family Ifritidae, making the family monotypic.The bird belongs to the order Passeriformes and the superfamily Corvoidea, a large group that also includes crows, birds of paradise, and jays.

The species (Ifrita kowaldi) was first described by Charles Walter De Vis (1890), while the genus Ifrita was discovered by Walter Rothschild in 1898.

=== Taxonomic history and evolution ===
Previously, the ifrit has been placed in a plethora of families including Cinclosomatidae or Monarchidae. Blue-capped ifrits are considered an ancient relict species endemic to New Guinea. This corvoid species originally dates back to the Oligocene epoch, on a series of proto-Papuan islands, with minimal known evolutionary divergences.

=== Common names ===
The blue-capped ifrit is known a variety names in different languages.

- English: Blue-capped Ifrit / Blue-capped Ifrita / Ifrit
- German: Blaukappenflöter
- Dutch: Blauwkapifrita
- Danish: Blåkrone
- Norwegian: Blåkroneifrit
- Spanish: Ifrita
- Italian: Ifrita

== Habitat ==
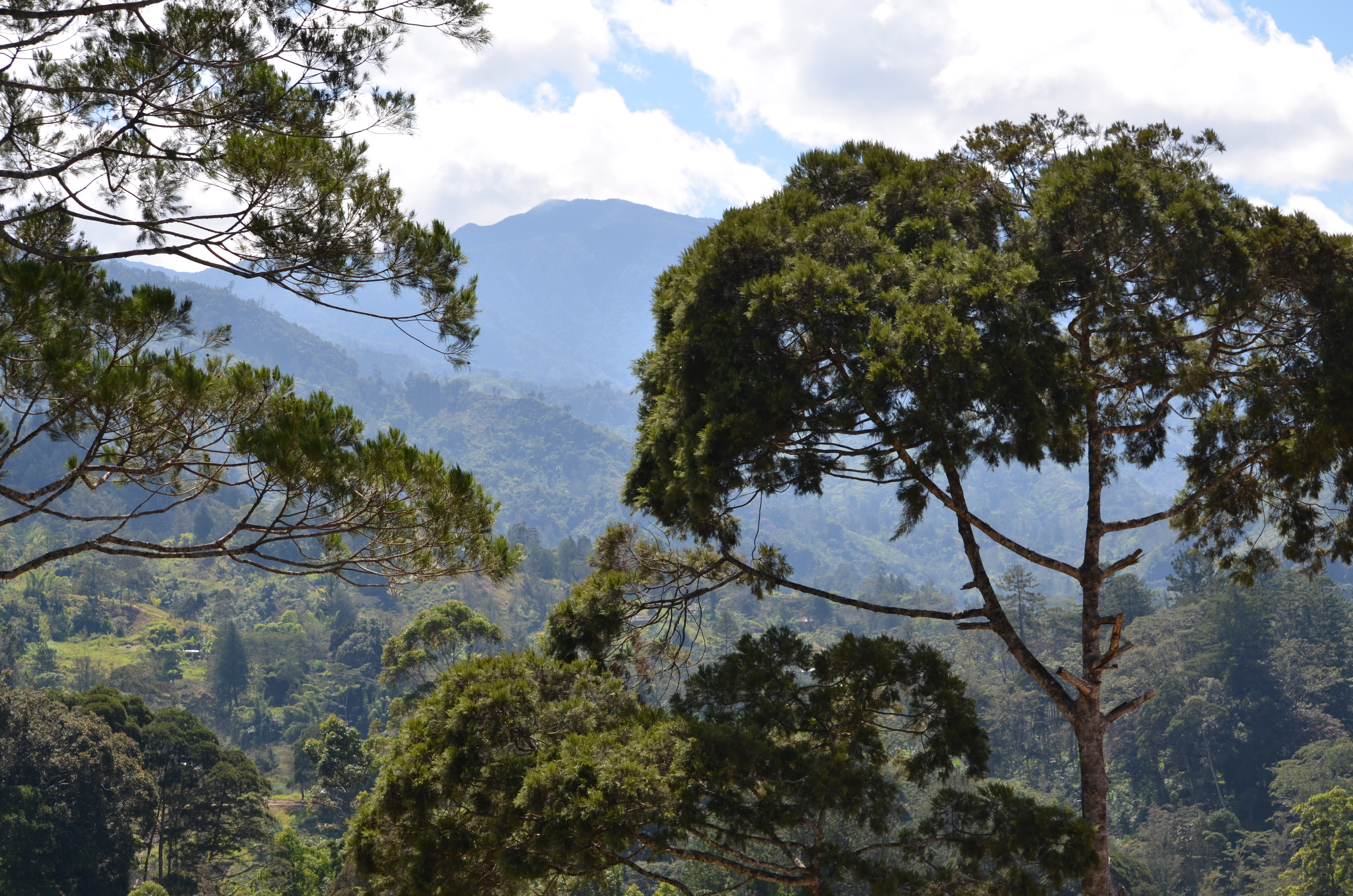
Highlands in New Guinea

Blue-capped ifrits are endemic to Western New Guinea and Papua New Guinea, being found nowhere else on earth, with a distribution of 388,000 km^{2}. They occur in both countries, including the Southern Highlands, Western Highlands, Enga, Morobe, and Eastern Highland provinces.

The species mainly lives in subtropical and tropical moist montane forests and is highly dependent on the forest ecosystem. It is found from roughly 100 to 4,000 meters (210–12,070 ft) in elevation, though it is most commonly found at altitudes of 1,500 meters (4,900 feet) or above.

== Toxicity ==
Batrachotoxin molecule

The blue-capped ifrit is one of the few birds that accumulate batrachotoxin (BTX) in their feathers and skin. This potent neurotoxin is thought to be deadlier than cyanide and causes sneezing, irritation, and allergic reactions in humans who handle the bird.

=== Source of the toxin ===
Batrachotoxin is thought to enter the Ifrit's body through its diet, most likely from Chroesine beetles from the Melyridae family. Some researchers believe these beetles may gain the toxin from soil mites or certain plants. The chemical provides the bird with strong protection against predators and parasites. Levels of BTX can vary between species and individuals, but the blue-capped ifrit and the hooded pitohui (Pitohui dichrous) showed the highest concentrations. In 2023, scientists discovered two additional toxic bird species from Papua New Guinea, highlighting how little is still known about toxic avians.

=== Mechanism, effects, and adaptations ===
Batrachotoxin (BTX) works by holding the sodium ion channels in muscle and nerve cells open, which can cause muscle paralysis and potentially death. The blue-capped ifrit, however, is resistant to its own toxin because of a mutation in the SCN4A gene, which encodes the NAV1.4 sodium channel. This channel is essential to muscle contraction. This mutation changes the channel's shape so the BTX cannot bind properly, explained by target-site insensitivity. Similar mutations are found in poison dart frogs, providing an example of convergent evolution.

Some studies suggest that the sodium channels remain partly sensitive, so scientists believe that the bird may also produce a protein that "soaks up the poison" safely. Additionally, because the blue-capped ifrit must move BTX from its stomach to its feathers and skin, researchers believe there is a transporter protein that distributes it.

== Behavior ==
=== Mating ===
Nesting occurs from August to November. Nests are built from green moss and leaf fern and are usually placed 2–3 meters (6.5–10 ft) above the ground, often in a fork of a small tree or sapling. Each clutch typically contains a single white egg with black and purple spots for camouflage. Both parents participate in nest building and chick care, and the small clutch size points to a high investment in the offspring (k-selected species). The birds' toxin-covered breast and belly feathers may rub off on the egg or nest, which offers chemical protection from predators.

=== Vocalization ===
The blue-capped ifrit's song produces an upbeat "toowa-tee!", along with a short dry "wik" call.

=== Diet ===
The species is insectivorous, feeding primarily on insects and worms. Ifrits forage carefully through moss, branches, and tree trunks. Occasionally, the bird will eat soft fruits to supplement its food sources. The blue-capped ifrit's toxicity is gained though its diet, mostly from Choresine beetles.

=== Social and territorial behavior ===
Blue-capped ifrits are often seen in small groups of up to six, suggesting social behavior. The birds are rarely seen alone, which may indicate that are not territorial.

== Conservation status ==
Ifrits are of least concern because they have a large range and have relatively large population. Some of their habitat is within conservation sites. Although the birds are toxic, they have not been found in bird markets or sold online in Indonesia, unlike the pitohuis. The species is not officially protected by Indonesian law, because the trade is unregulated, so they could be sold illegally. While the population is slowly decreasing, the decline is not fast enough for the species to be considered vulnerable. However, data shows that tree cover in their habitat has declined by 1.7% over the past decade, which has contributed to a population decline of up to 19%.

== See also ==
- Batrachotoxin
- Toxic bird

== Bibliography ==
- del Hoyo, J.; Elliot, A.; Christie, D., eds. (2007). Handbook of the Birds of the World. Vol. 12: Picathartes to Tits and Chickadees. Lynx Edicions. ISBN 978-84-96553-42-2.
