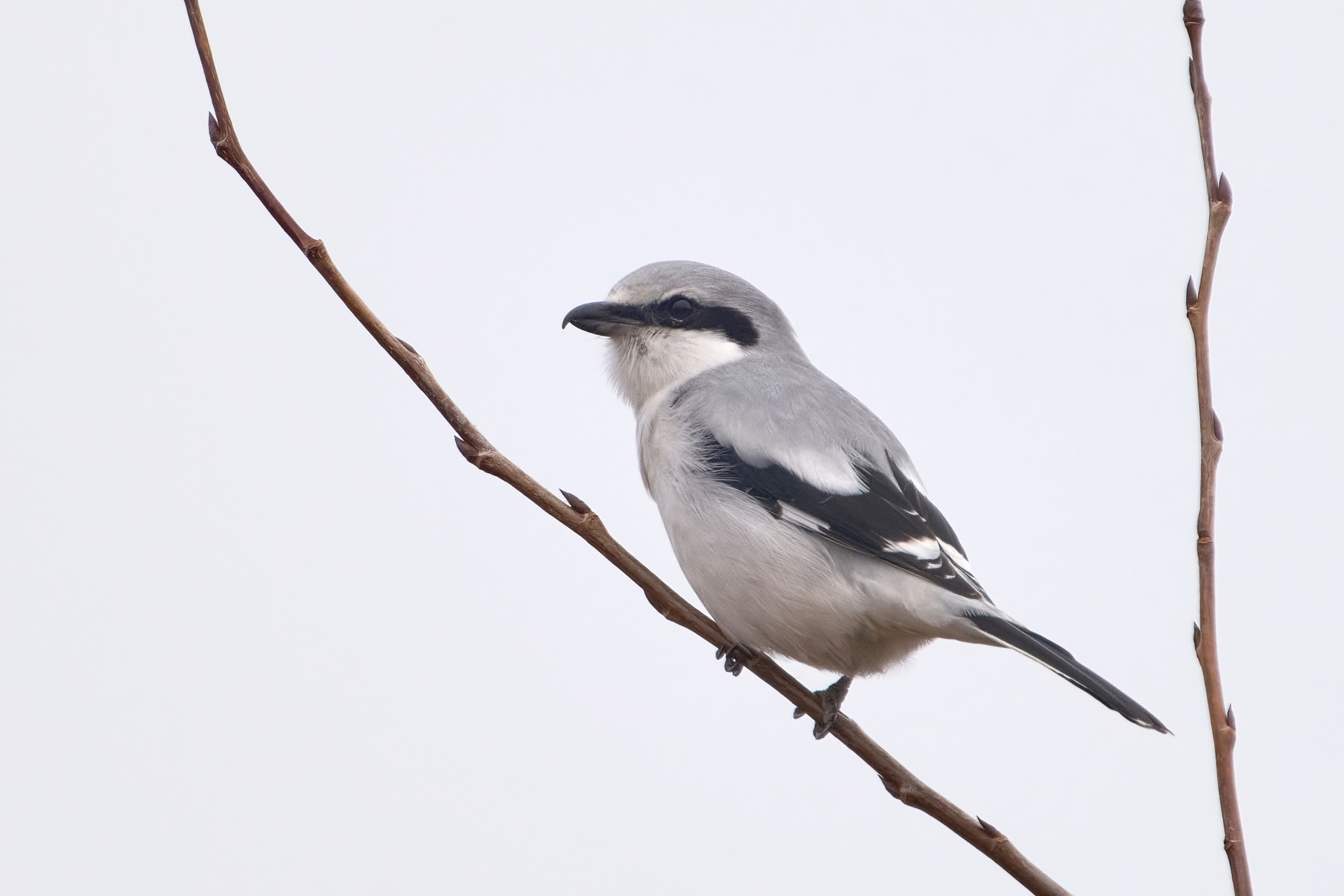
- Nominate subspecies of great grey shrike

Scientific classification
- Kingdom: Animalia
- Phylum: Chordata
- Class: Aves
- Order: Passeriformes
- Infraorder: Corvides
- Superfamily: Corvoidea

Families
- See text

= Corvoidea =

Superfamily of birds

Corvoidea is a superfamily of birds in the order of Passeriformes.

== Systematics ==
Corvoidea contains the following families:

- Rhipiduridae – fantails
- Dicruridae – drongos
- Monarchidae – monarch flycatchers
- Ifritidae – blue-capped ifrit
- Paradisaeidae – birds-of-paradise
- Corcoracidae – white-winged chough and apostlebird
- Melampittidae – melampittas
- Laniidae – shrikes
- Platylophidae - jayshrike
- Corvidae – crows, ravens, and jays
Phylogenetic relationships of corvoid families

- - Rhipiduridae
  - - Dicruridae
    - - - Monarchidae
        - - Ifritidae
          - Paradisaeidae
      - - Corcoracidae
        - - - Melampittidae
            - - Corvidae
              - - Platylophidae
                - Laniidae

Cladogram based on Oliveros et al. (2019)

- - - Rhipiduridae
    - Dicruridae
  - - Monarchidae
    - - - Ifritidae
        - Paradisaeidae
      - - Struthideidae (=Corcoracidae)
        - - Corvidae
          - - Platylophidae
            - Laniidae

Cladogram based on Kuhl et al. (2020)
