= Siphonorhis =

Scientific classification
- Kingdom: Animalia
- Phylum: Chordata
- Class: Aves
- Order: Caprimulgiformes
- Family: Caprimulgidae
- Genus: Siphonorhis; P.L. Sclater, 1861

Type species
- Caprimulgus americanus Linnaeus, 1758

Genus of birds

Siphonorhis is a genus of nightjars, known as the Caribbean pauraques, in the family Caprimulgidae. All species are endemic to islands of the Greater Antilles, with only one confirmed to be extant.

== Taxonomy ==
The genus Siphonorhis was introduced in 1861 by the English zoologist Philip Sclater with Caprimulgus americanus Linnaeus, 1758, the Jamaican poorwill, as the type species. The genus name is derived from Ancient Greek σιφων/siphōn, σιφωνος/siphōnos meaning "tube" and ῥις/rhis, ῥινος/rhinos meaning "nostrils".

== Species ==
It contains the following two species:

- Jamaican poorwill or Jamaican pauraque (Siphonorhis americana), possibly extinct
- Least poorwill or least pauraque (Siphonorhis brewsteri), endemic to Hispaniola (Dominican Republic and Haiti)

An additional species, the Cuban pauraque (†Siphonorhis daiquiri) is known only from fossil material.
