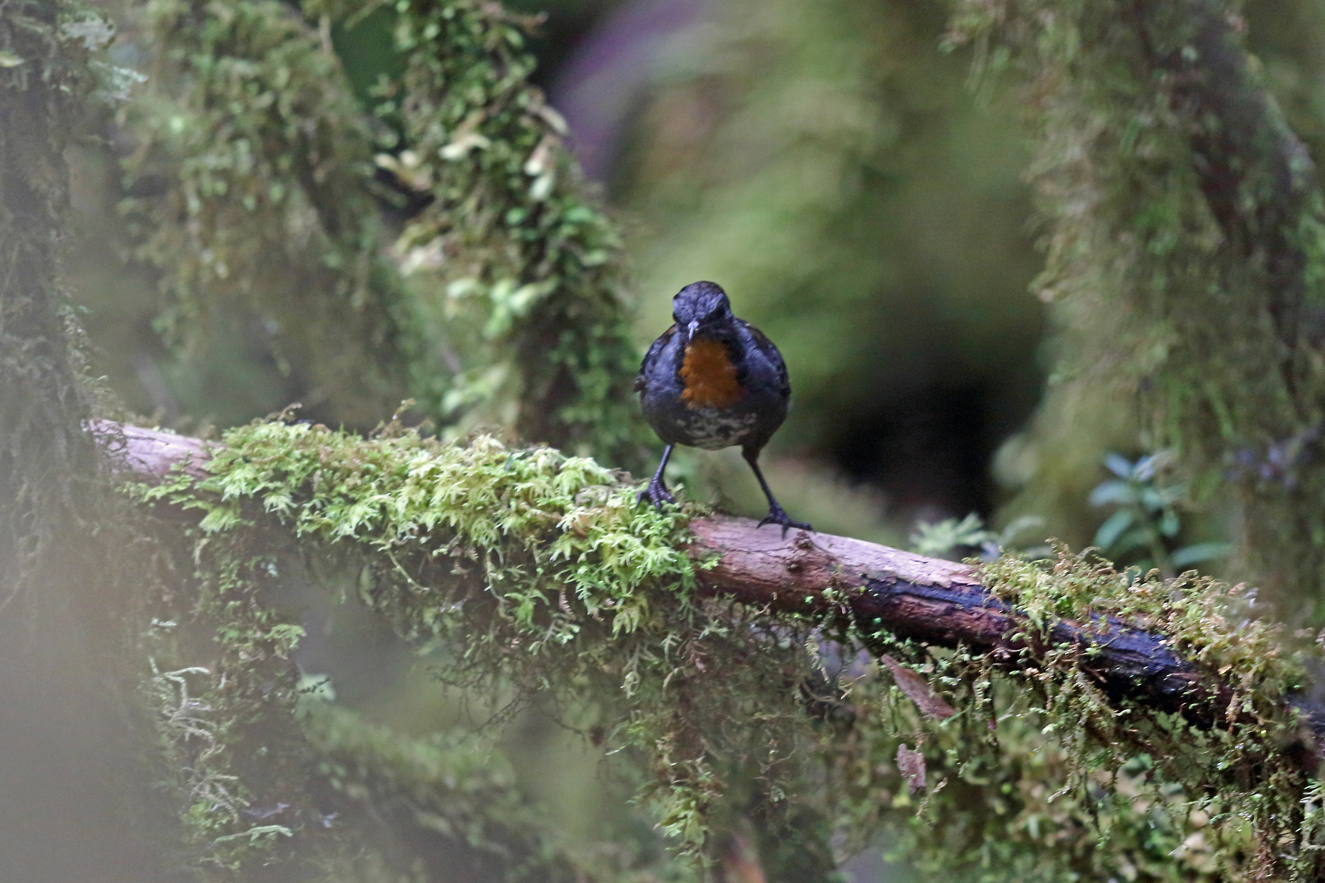

Conservation status
- Least Concern (IUCN 3.1)

Scientific classification
- Kingdom: Animalia
- Phylum: Chordata
- Class: Aves
- Order: Passeriformes
- Family: Orthonychidae
- Genus: Orthonyx
- Species: O. novaeguineae

Binomial name
- Orthonyx novaeguineae Meyer, 1874

= Papuan logrunner =

Species of bird

The Papuan logrunner or New Guinea logrunner (Orthonyx novaeguineae) is a species of bird in the family Orthonychidae. It was formerly considered conspecific with the Australian logrunner.

== Habitat and Location ==
It is found in the highlands of New Guinea. Its natural habitat is subtropical or tropical moist montane forests.
