= Orthonyx kaldowinyeri =

Orthonyx kaldowinyeri Temporal range: Late Oligocene to early Late Miocene, 28–7 Ma

Scientific classification
- Kingdom: Animalia
- Phylum: Chordata
- Class: Aves
- Order: Passeriformes
- Family: Orthonychidae
- Genus: Orthonyx
- Species: O. kaldowinyeri

Binomial name
- Orthonyx kaldowinyeri Boles, 1993

Extinct species of bird

Orthonyx kaldowinyeri is an extinct species of logrunner from the Late Oligocene to the Miocene of Australia. It was described by Walter Boles from fossil material (a complete left femur) found at the Last Minute Site of Riversleigh, in the Boodjamulla National Park of north-western Queensland. It was a relatively small logrunner. The specific epithet kaldowinyeri is an Aboriginal term for “old”, referring to the Miocene age of the species which is earlier than that of other members of the genus.
