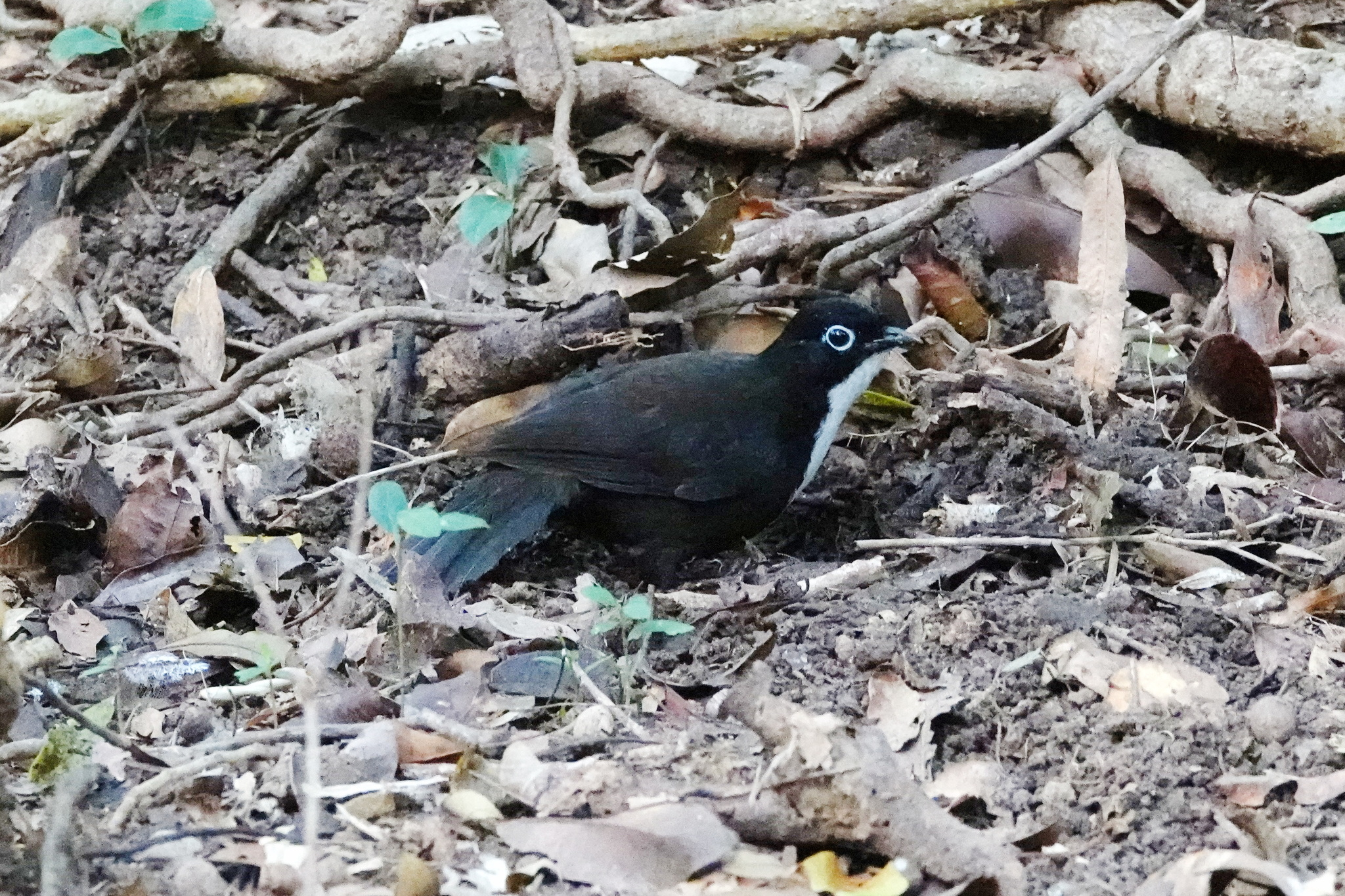
- Chowchilla at Lake Barrine, Queensland

Conservation status
- Least Concern (IUCN 3.1)

Scientific classification
- Kingdom: Animalia
- Phylum: Chordata
- Class: Aves
- Order: Passeriformes
- Family: Orthonychidae
- Genus: Orthonyx
- Species: O. spaldingii

Binomial name
- Orthonyx spaldingii Ramsay, 1868
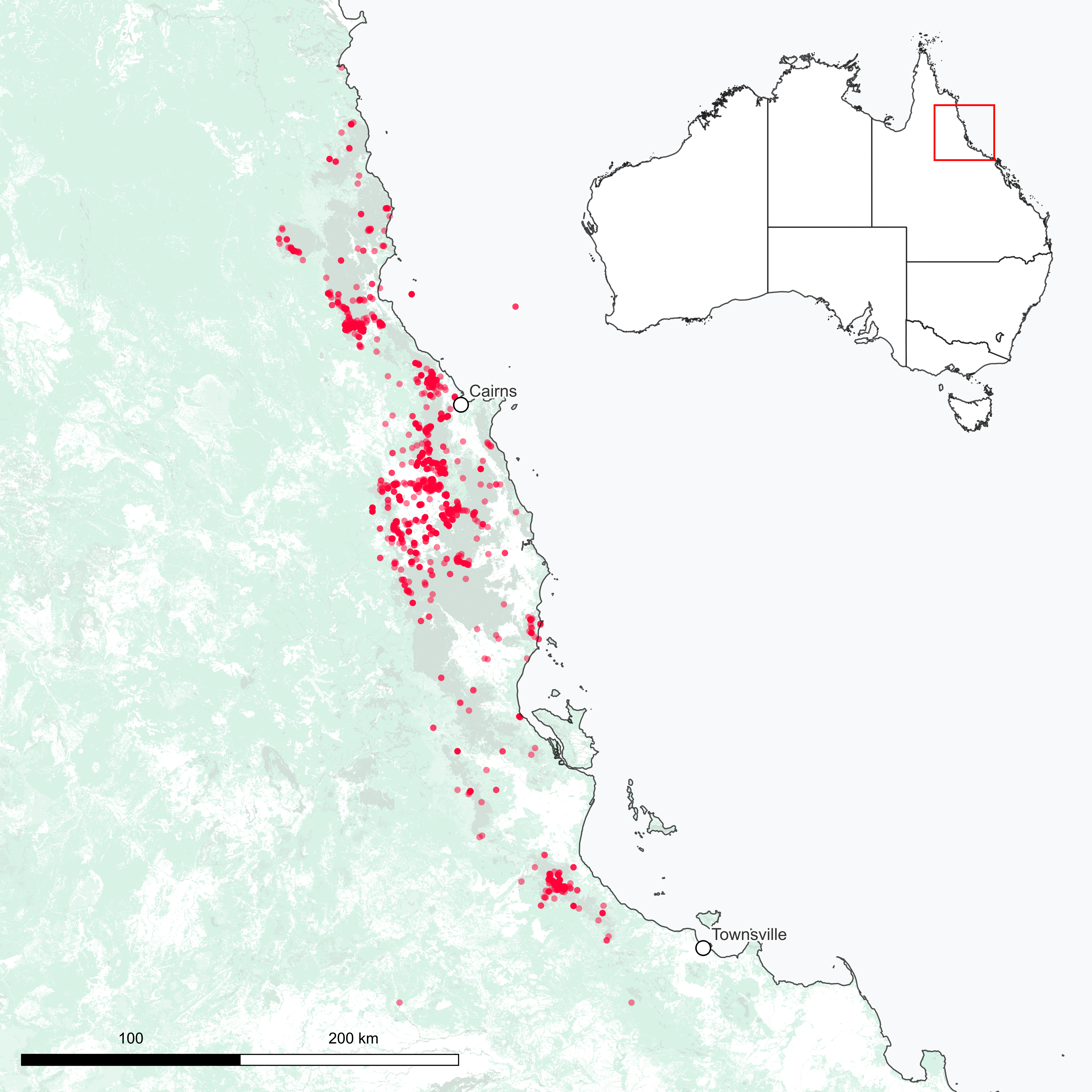
- Species distribution

= Chowchilla =

Species of bird

The chowchilla (Orthonyx spaldingii) is a passerine bird in the family Orthonychidae. It is endemic to Australia.

== Taxonomy ==
In their 1999 study, Schodde and Mason recognise two adjoining subspecies, O. s. spaldingii and O. s. melasmenus with a zone of intergradation.

== Description ==
Unmistakable thrush-like, ground-dwelling, birds. Males and females largely dark brown with white eye-ring, tail-feather shafts extend as spines beyond feather-vanes; males with white throat, breast and belly; females with bright rufous throat and upper breast, white lower breast and belly.

== Distribution and habitat ==
The chowchilla is restricted to upland and lowland tropical rainforests of north-eastern Queensland.

== Behaviour ==
=== Diet ===
Mainly invertebrates, but also small vertebrates.

=== Voice ===
Continuous chattering, singing and other complex vocalisations.

=== Breeding ===
Nests on or near ground, often on ferns, stumps or logs. Builds a bulky, dome-shaped stick-nest with a clutch of one, possibly sometimes two, white eggs.

== Gallery ==
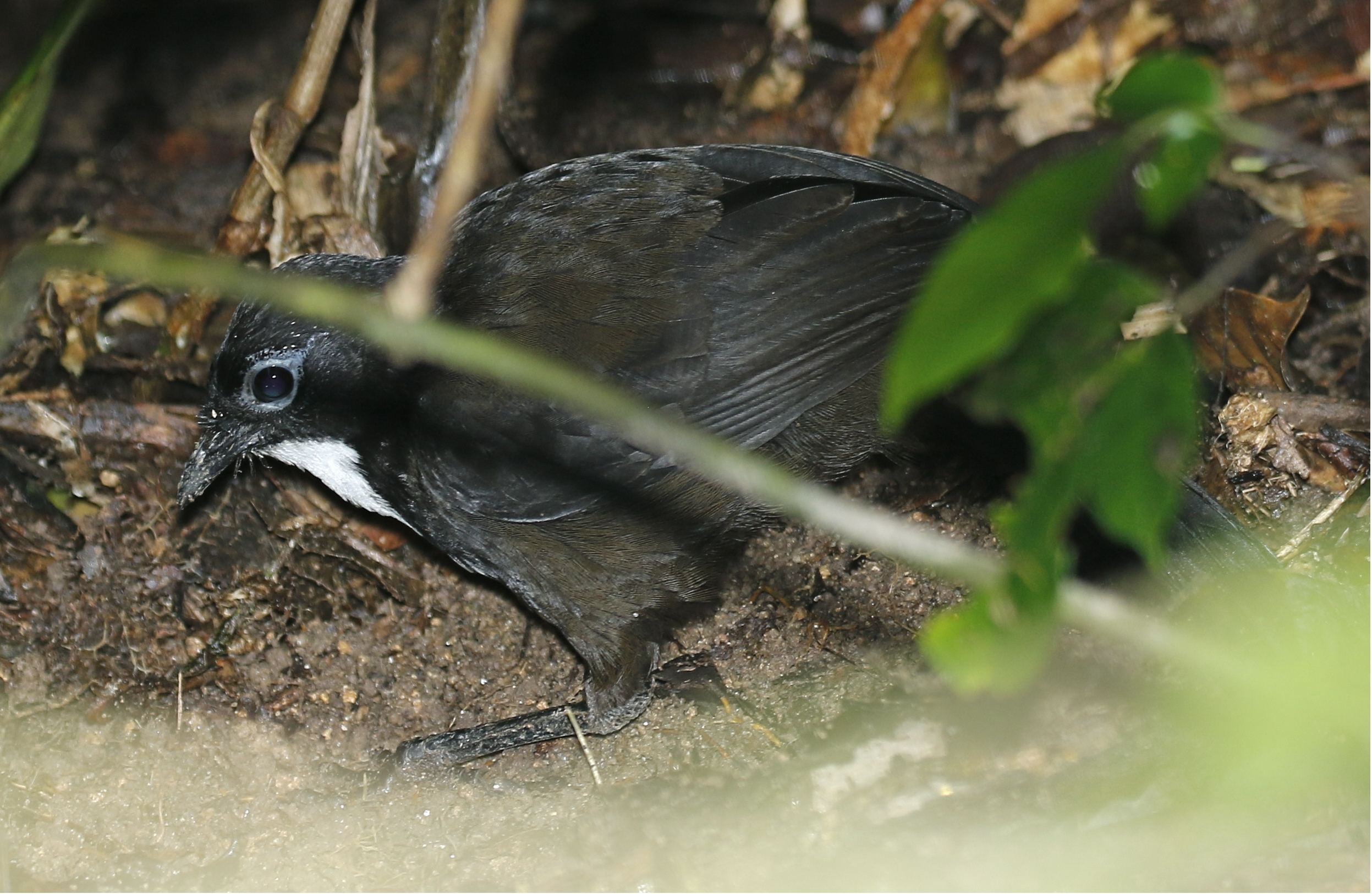
Near Mount Lewis – Australia

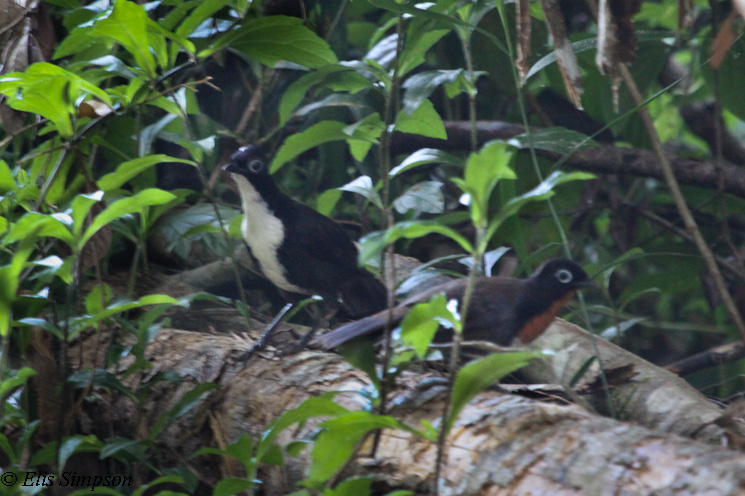
Male (left). female (right)
