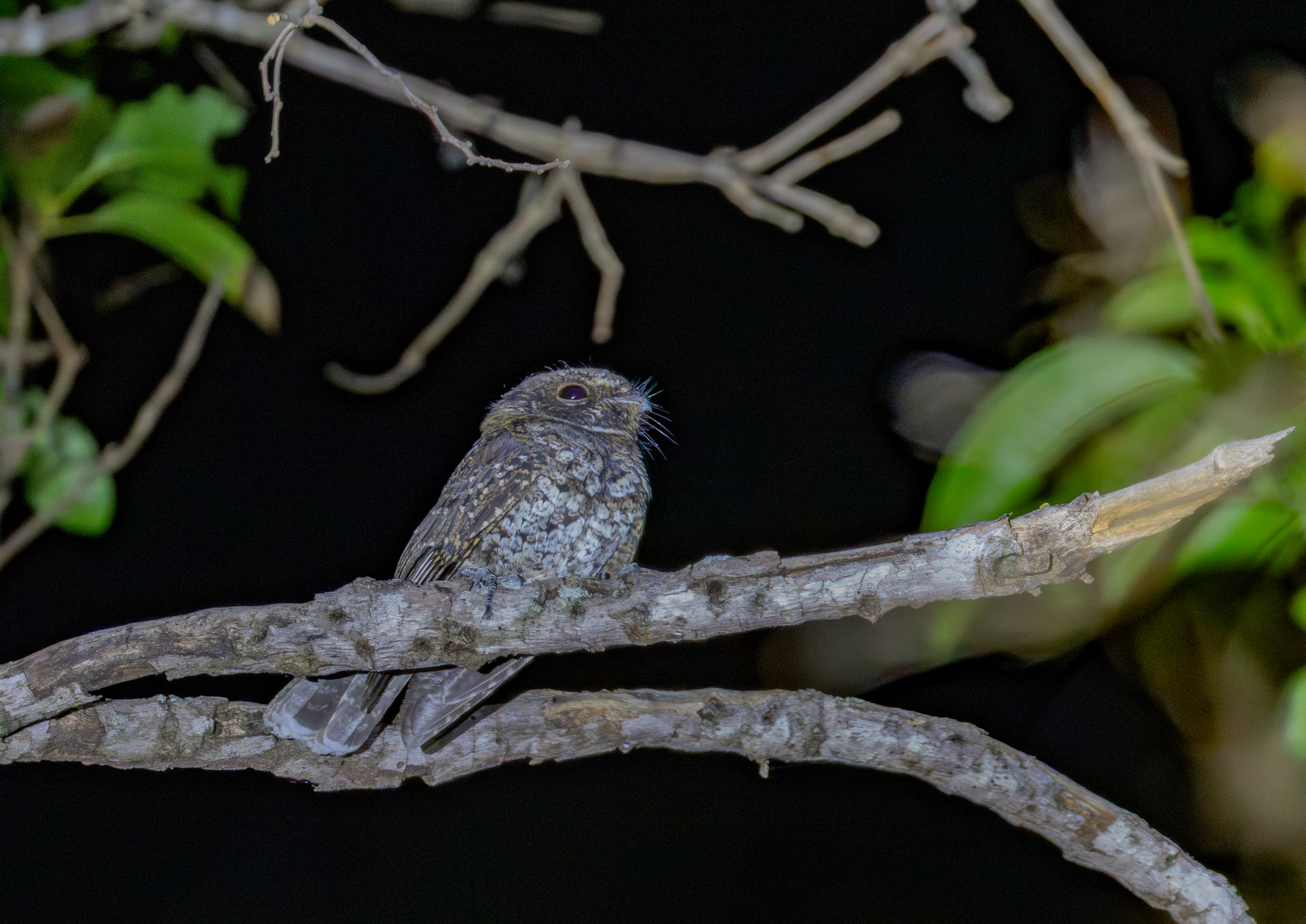

Conservation status
- Near Threatened (IUCN 3.1)

Scientific classification
- Kingdom: Animalia
- Phylum: Chordata
- Class: Aves
- Order: Caprimulgiformes
- Family: Caprimulgidae
- Genus: Siphonorhis
- Species: S. brewsteri

Binomial name
- Siphonorhis brewsteri (Chapman, 1917)

= Least poorwill =

Species of bird

The least poorwill or least pauraque (Siphonorhis brewsteri) is a species of nightjar in the family Caprimulgidae, and the only confirmed extant species of its genus. It is endemic to the island of Hispaniola, which is shared by the Dominican Republic and Haiti.

== Taxonomy and systematics ==
The least poorwill was previously considered conspecific with the Jamaican poorwill (Siphonorhis americana), which is believed to be possibly extinct. It has two subspecies, the nominate S. b. brewsteri and S. b. gonavensis.

== Description ==
The least poorwill is 17 to 21.5 cm (6.7 to 8.5 in) long. The nominate subspecies' upperparts are grayish brown with blackish streaks and the folded wing shows bold white spots. It has a wide buff collar on the hindneck. The breast is dark brown with white spots and the belly white with brown bars and vermiculation. All but the central tail feathers have narrow pale tips, white in the male and buff in the female. S. b. gonavensis is thought to be smaller and paler overall.

== Distribution and habitat ==
The nominate subspecies of least poorwill is found throughout the central, northwestern and southwestern parts of the Dominican Republic (especially Pedernales, Independencia, and Barahona Provinces), as well as adjoining Centre, Nord and Ouest Departments in Haiti. S. b. gonavensis is found only on Haiti's Ile de la Gonâve.

The least poorwill mostly inhabits the Hispaniolan dry forests, arid to semi-arid landscapes composed of limestone woodland and areas of cactus and thorn scrub. It also occurs in Hispaniolan moist forests|deciduous, broadleaf]] and coniferous forest. In elevation it ranges from sea level to 800 m (2,600 ft).

== Behavior ==
=== Feeding ===
Little is known about the least poorwill's feeding behavior and diet, though the latter is believed to be insects, following the dietary habits of other members of its family.

=== Breeding ===
The least poorwill is believed to breed between April and June. One clutch of two eggs was laid directly on the ground with no nest.

=== Vocalization ===
The male least poorwill's song is "a whistled 'toorrrrri' rising in pitch, or a warbled 'tworrri'." The species also makes "short, whistled 'toorric' or 'to-ic'" calls and "dove-like scratchy sounds".

== Status ==
The IUCN originally assessed the least poorwill in 1988 as Near Threatened and changed the rating to Data Deficient in 2000. Since 2007 it has again been assessed as Near Threatened. Its population is estimated at fewer than 15,000 mature individuals and is decreasing. The species is thought to be generally rare, although it can be locally common, and is possibly under-reported due to its nocturnal nature. Recorded sightings are overwhelmingly in the Dominican Republic, with very few in Haiti, where the species' status is currently unknown. The primary threats are habitat destruction and predation by introduced mongooses and rats.
