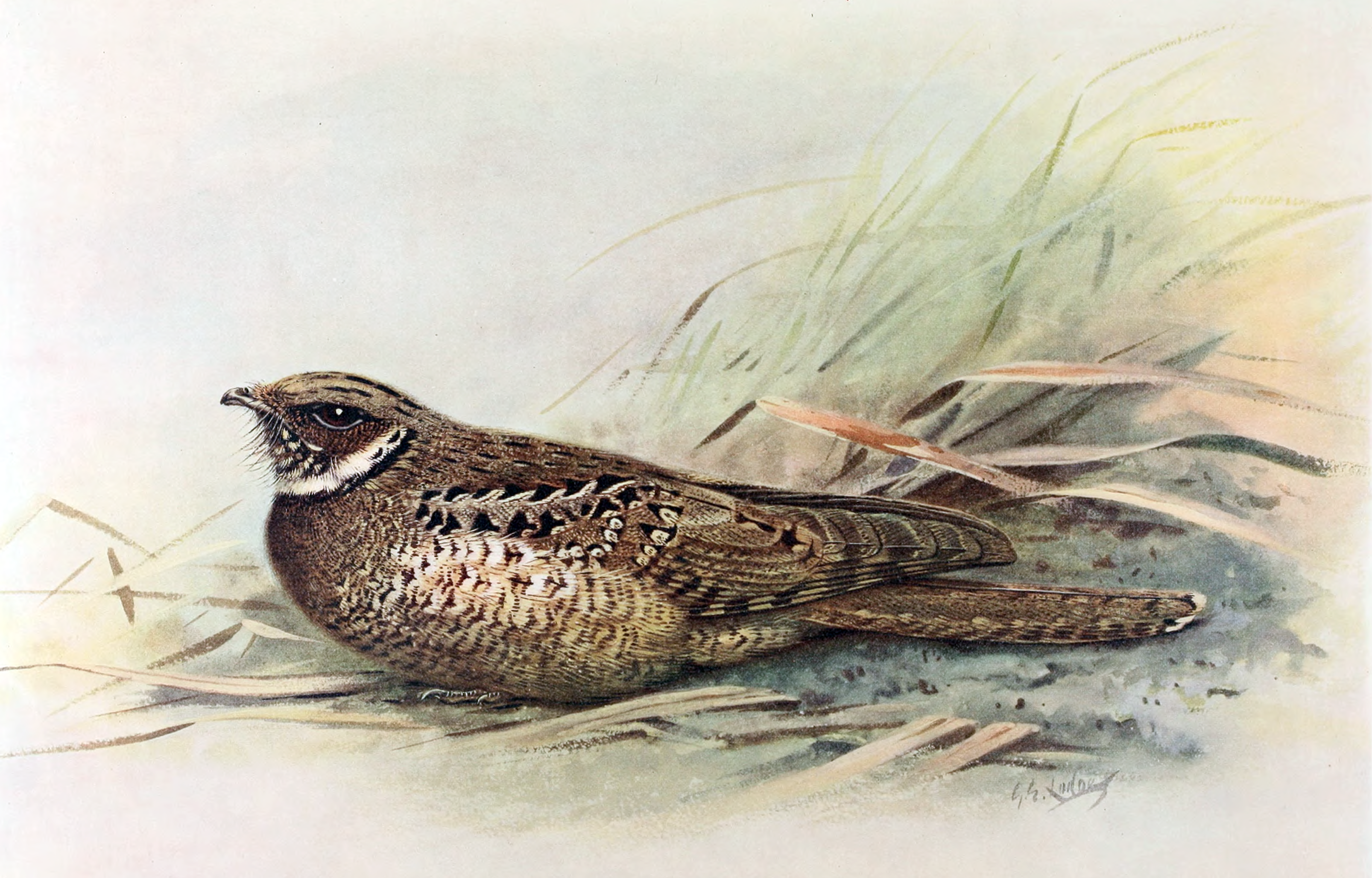
- Illustration by George Edward Lodge, 1907

Conservation status
- Critically endangered, possibly extinct (IUCN 3.1)

Scientific classification
- Kingdom: Animalia
- Phylum: Chordata
- Class: Aves
- Clade: Strisores
- Order: Caprimulgiformes
- Family: Caprimulgidae
- Genus: Siphonorhis
- Species: S. americana

Binomial name
- Siphonorhis americana (Linnaeus, 1758)

Synonyms
- Caprimulgus americanus Linnaeus, 1758

= Jamaican poorwill =

Species of bird

The Jamaican poorwill (Siphonorhis americana), also known as the Jamaican pauraque or Jamaican least pauraque, is a species of nightjar in the family Caprimulgidae. It is (or was) endemic to Jamaica and has not been recorded since 1860.

== Taxonomy and systematics ==
The first formal description of the Jamaican poorwill was by the Swedish naturalist Carl Linnaeus in 1758 in the tenth edition of his Systema Naturae under the binomial name Caprimulgus americanus. It was at one time considered conspecific with the only other living species in its genus, the least poorwill (Siphonorhis brewsteri). It is monotypic.

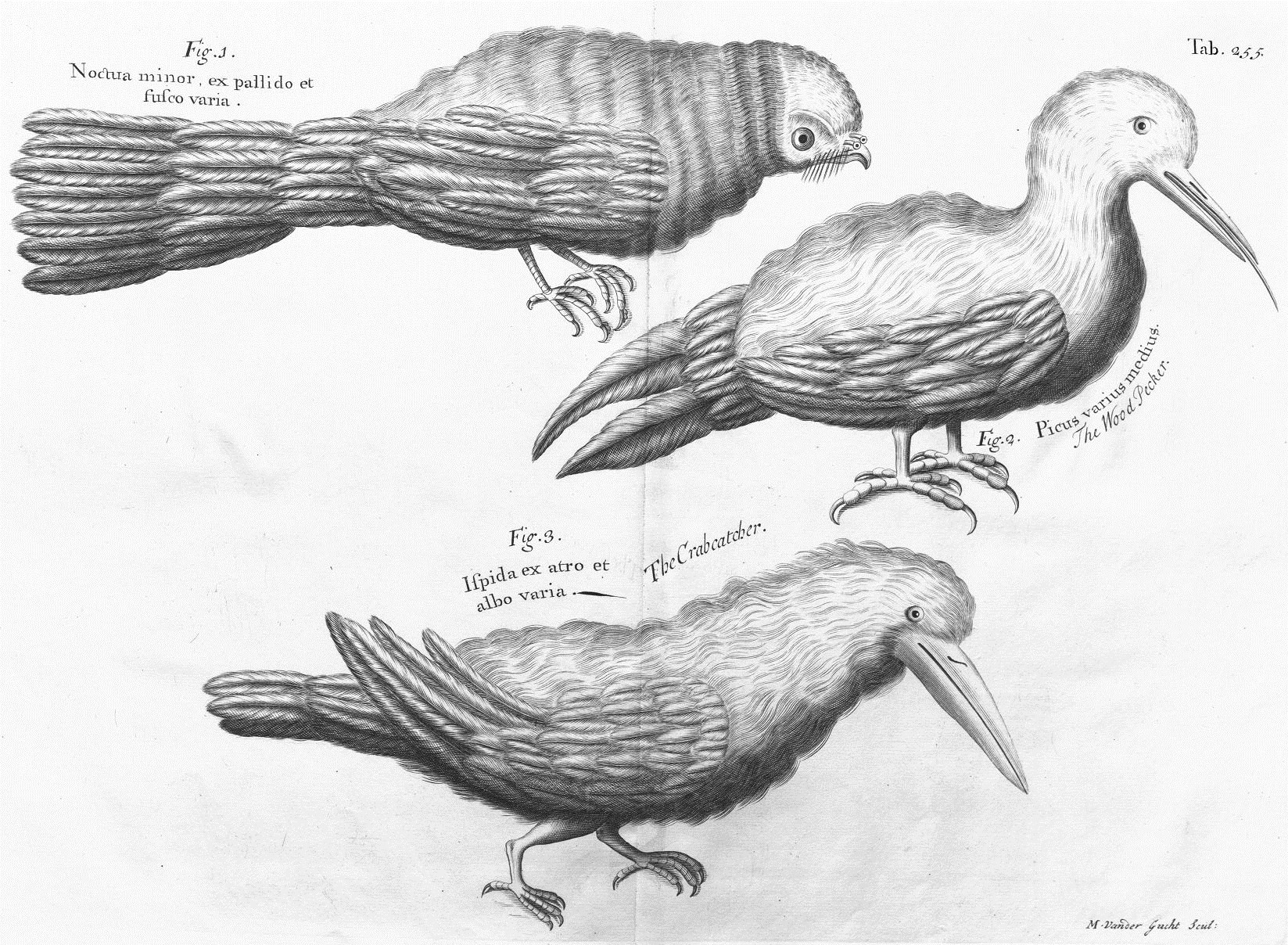
An illustration of a specimen, from 1725 (top left)

== Description ==
The Jamaican poorwill is known only from a very few specimens, the most recent of which was collected in the mid 1800s. It is 23 to 25 cm (9.1 to 9.8 in) long. The male's upperparts are rufous brown with blackish streaks. It has a faint rufous buff collar on the hindneck. The chin and upper throat are rufous, the lower throat clear white, the breast rufous with faint narrow brown barring, and the belly and flanks buff with brown bars and large whitish spots. The tail is mostly rufous brown with brown flecks and bars; all but the central feathers have white tips. The female is similar to the male, but somewhat less rufous overall; its underparts are more heavily spotted and the tips of the tail feathers are buffy. It possessed distinct 2 mm long tubular nostrils that differentiated it from its relatives on the mainland.

== Distribution and habitat ==
The few specimens of Jamaican poorwill from known localities were collected on the south side of the island. It was described as rare to locally uncommon during the first half of the 19th century. The habitats in Jamaica's south side included low elevation dry limestone forest, semi-open woodland, and open country.

== Behaviour ==
=== Feeding ===
The Jamaican poorwill is assumed to have been a nocturnal aerial insectivore like the least poorwill.

=== Breeding ===
The Jamaican poorwill is assumed to have laid its eggs on the ground without a nest like the least poorwill.

=== Vocalization ===
The Jamaican poorwill's vocalizations were not described by the collectors.

== Status ==
The IUCN has assessed the Jamaican poorwill as Critically Endangered (Possibly Extinct). The International Ornithological Committee (IOC) and Clements taxonomy consider it definitely extinct.
