= Greater melampitta =

Conservation status
- Least Concern (IUCN 3.1)

Scientific classification
- Kingdom: Animalia
- Phylum: Chordata
- Class: Aves
- Order: Passeriformes
- Family: Melampittidae
- Genus: Megalampitta; Schodde & Christidis, 2014
- Species: M. gigantea

Binomial name
- Megalampitta gigantea (Rothschild, 1899)

Synonyms
- Melampitta gigantea

Species of bird

The greater melampitta (Megalampitta gigantea) is a species of bird in the family Melampittidae. It is the only species in the genus Megalampitta, although it was once placed in the genus Melampitta with the lesser melampitta. Formerly classified as a bird-of-paradise, the little-known greater melampitta has an uncertain taxonomy and is sometimes believed to be affiliated to pitohuis, as it appears to be poisonous to eat (Frith and Beehler 1998).

It is found in New Guinea. Its natural habitats are subtropical or tropical moist lowland forests and subtropical or tropical moist montane forests. It is often found in karsts, and nests in narrow limestone sinkholes. It is primarily ground-dwelling, and cannot fly for long distances.
