= Fossil Cave =

Flooded cave in the Limestone Coast area of South Australia

- The Green Waterhole, 5L81
- Location within South Australia
- Location: Princes Highway, Tantanoola, South Australia, Australia
- Coordinates: 37°43′55″S 140°31′52″E
- Depth: 15 metres (49 feet)
- Length: 70 metres (230 feet)
- Geology: Oligocene coralline limestone
- Entrances: 1
- Difficulty: Above water - no stated difficulty Underwater - CDAA Advanced Cave grade
- Hazards: silting, overhead environment
- Access: Above water - public (no disabled access). Underwater - CDAA members only.
- Cave survey: FUUC, 1978; Allum and Garrad, 1979; SAUSS, 1987; Horne, 1986-88

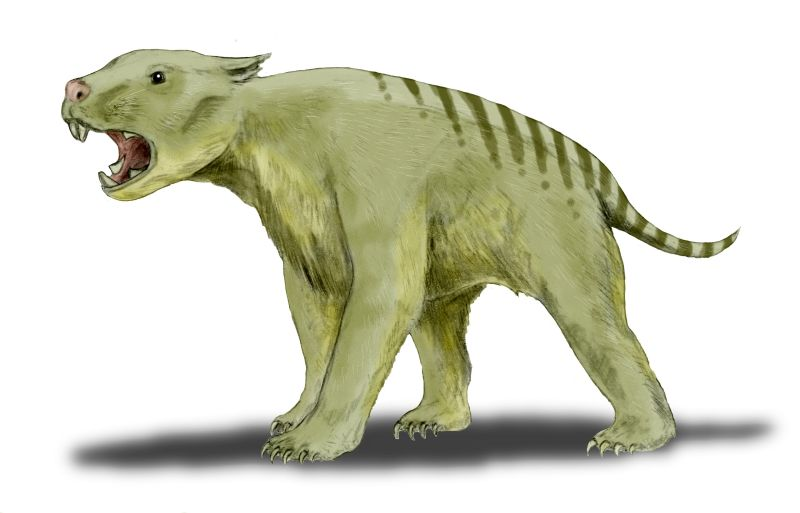
Reconstruction of Thylacoleo carnifex, the “Marsupial Lion”, remains of which have been found in the cave

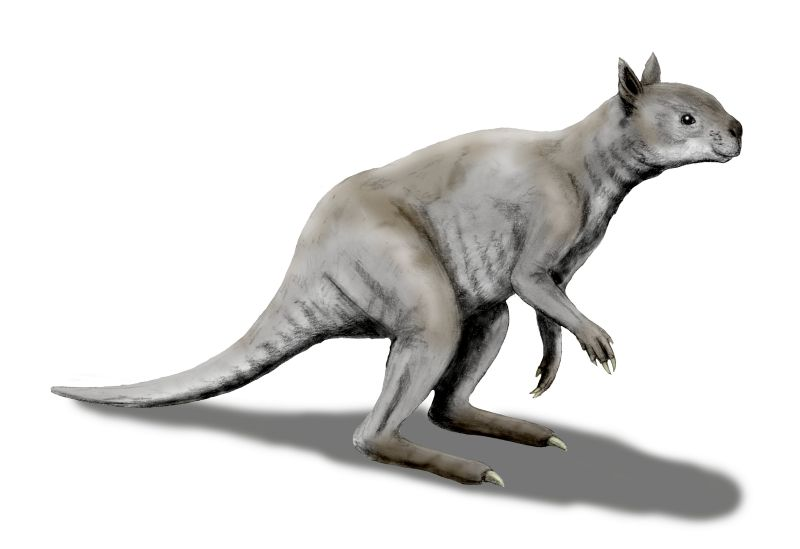
Reconstruction of the giant kangaroo Simosthenurus occidentalis

Fossil Cave (5L81), formerly known as The Green Waterhole, is a cave in the Limestone Coast region of south-eastern South Australia. It is located in the gazetted locality of Tantanoola about 22 kilometres (14 miles) north-west of the city of Mount Gambier, only a few metres from the Princes Highway (Route B1) between Mount Gambier and Millicent. It is popular with cave divers and is notable for being both a unique paleontological site and the "type locality" for very rare crustaceans (syncarids - Koonunga sp.) which to date have been found only in caves and Blue Lake in the Mount Gambier region.

== Description and naming ==
The cave is formed in 30-million-year-old Oligocene coralline limestone. The cave is a karst sinkhole and is largely filled with water. The surface depression is about 20 metres (66 ft) long and 10 metres (33 ft) wide. Beneath the surface it extends to a maximum length of 70 metres (230 ft) and a width of 30 metres (98 ft).

The name of the cave was changed on 23 April 1989 by the Government of South Australia from The Green Waterhole to Fossil Cave with the change being published in The South Australian Government Gazette on 4 May 1989.

== Fossils ==
Since the mid-1960s, a variety of Pleistocene subfossil material of birds and mammals has been found and recovered by divers from the surface of a rockpile to a depth of about 15 metres (49 ft) below the water surface. The probable accumulation mode was by animals drowning when they fell into the cave while attempting to use it as a source of drinking water. Dating of the subfossil remains indicated that their deposition occurred mainly between 15,000 and 40,000 years ago. As well as representing many living animals, examples of extinct species recovered from the cave include the birds Centropus colossus and Orthonyx hypsilophus, and the mammals Thylacinus cynocephalus, Thylacoleo carnifex, Propleopus oscillans, Macropus titan, Protemnodon anak, and the sthenurine kangaroos Procoptodon gilli, Procoptodon maddocki and Simosthenurus occidentalis.

== Exploration ==
Fossils were first collected from the cave in 1964 followed by a further collection in 1968 and logged with the South Australian Museum. During the next two decades a number of more extensive surveying, sedimentology and bone-recovery operations were carried out by cave divers working in conjunction with palaeontologist Dr Rod Wells and researcher Cate Newton (Flinders University) and the South Australian Underwater Speleological Society (SAUSS) Inc.

The cave's submerged extent has been surveyed at least three times including by the Flinders University Underwater Club (FUUC) in 1978, Allum and Garrad in 1979 and SAUSS in 1987.

== Recreational diving ==
Fossil Cave is a notable cave diving site. Access for cave diving is limited to holders of the Cave Divers Association of Australia's Advanced Cave grade.

== See also ==
- List of sinkholes of Australia
