= Orthonyx hypsilophus =

Orthonyx hypsilophus Temporal range: Late Pleistocene

Scientific classification
- Kingdom: Animalia
- Phylum: Chordata
- Class: Aves
- Order: Passeriformes
- Family: Orthonychidae
- Genus: Orthonyx
- Species: O. hypsilophus

Binomial name
- Orthonyx hypsilophus Baird, 1985

Extinct species of bird

Orthonyx hypsilophus is an extinct species of logrunner from the Late Pleistocene of Australia. It was described from submerged subfossil material (an incomplete pelvis) collected in 1979 from the Fossil Cave in the south-east of South Australia. The bird was larger than any of its living congeners. The specific epithet hypsilophus derives from the Greek νψι (“high”), and λοθοϛ (“crest” or “ridge”) with reference to the comparatively high median dorsal ridge of the pelvis.
