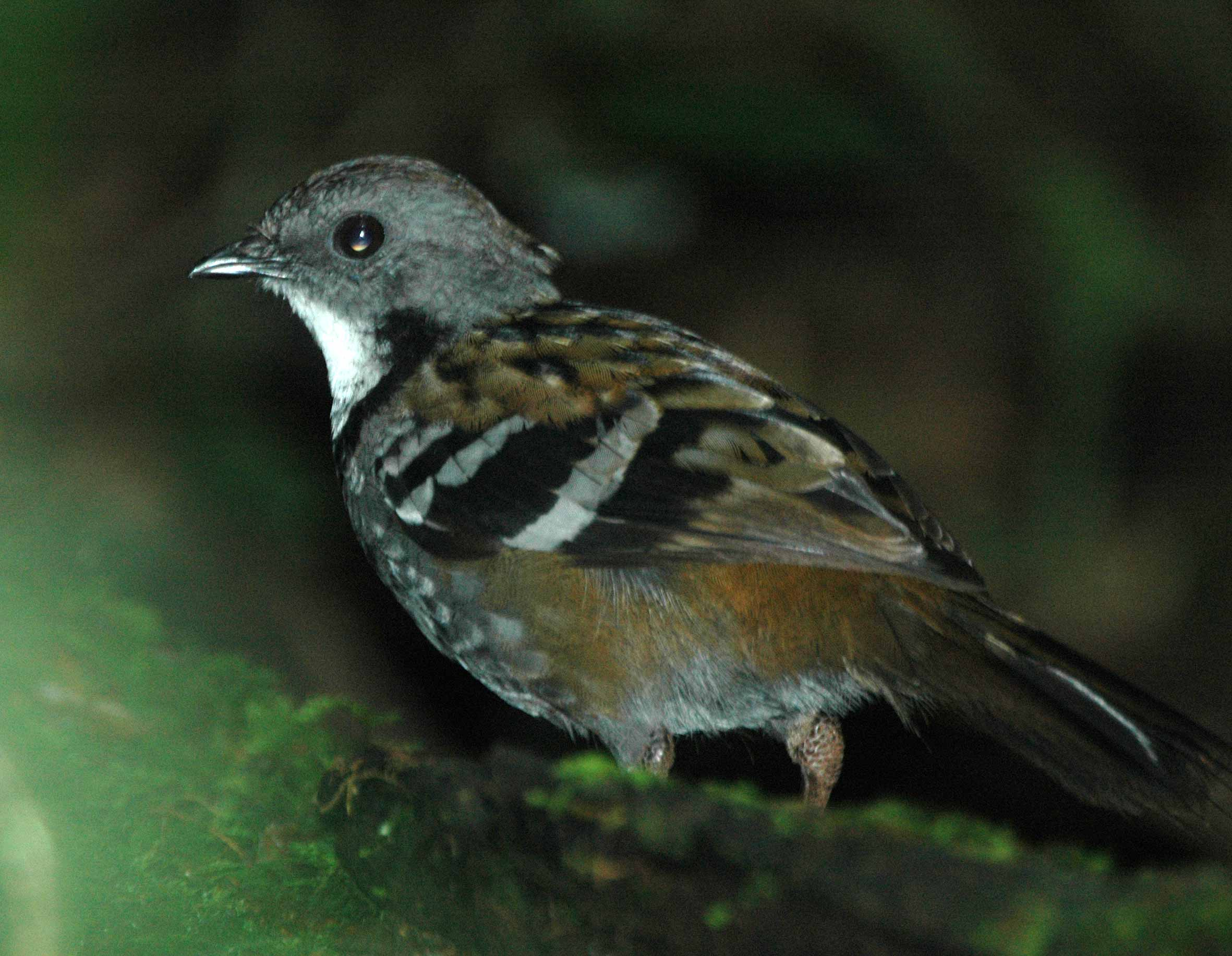
- Male Australian logrunner

Scientific classification
- Kingdom: Animalia
- Phylum: Chordata
- Class: Aves
- Order: Passeriformes
- Infraorder: Orthonychides
- Family: Orthonychidae; G.R. Gray, 1840
- Genus: Orthonyx; Temminck, 1820

Type species
- Orthonyx temminckii Ranzani, 1822

Species
- Orthonyx novaeguineae; Orthonyx temminckii; Orthonyx spaldingii

= Orthonychidae =

Logrunners

Family of birds

Orthonychidae is a clade of passerine birds endemic to Australia and New Guinea. It encompasses the genus Orthonyx, (from Ancient Greek ὀρθός (orthós), meaning "straight", and ὄνῠξ (ónŭx), meaning "claw") including the logrunners and the chowchilla. Some authorities consider the Australian family Cinclosomatidae to be part of the Orthonychidae. The three species use their stiffened tails to brace themselves when feeding.

The Australian logrunner, Orthonyx temminckii, is from northeastern New South Wales and southeast Queensland, where it is very local in its distribution, and strictly terrestrial in its habits. The wings are barred with white, and the chin, throat and breast are in the male pure white, but of a bright reddish-orange in the female. The remiges are very short, rounded and much incurved, showing a bird of weak flight. The rectrices are very broad, the shafts stiff, and towards the tip divested of barbs. The population which is found locally in New Guinea is now generally considered a separate species, the Papuan logrunner, Orthonyx novaeguineae.

The chowchilla, Orthonyx spaldingii, from north-east Queensland, is much larger than either species of logrunner, and has a jet-black plumage, the throat being white in the male and orange-rufous in the female.

== Taxonomy ==
The fossil record does not much help to determine the affiliations of the Orthonychidae. Three prehistoric species are known to science. The very large Orthonyx hypsilophus from Fossil Cave and an undescribed species found in Pyramids Cave which was a bit smaller than the Australian logrunner are probably of Late Pleistocene age. Orthonyx kaldowinyeri is known from Middle or Late Miocene deposits of Riversleigh; it is the oldest and smallest species known to date (Boles, 1993).

=== Species ===
Image	Scientific name	Common name	Distribution
	Orthonyx novaeguineae	Papuan logrunner	New Guinea
	Orthonyx temminckii	Australian logrunner	eastern Australia
	Orthonyx spaldingii	Chowchilla	Australia.

== Description ==
Logrunners have a length ranging from 17 to 20 cm. On the other hand, the bulky chowchilla is significantly larger, measuring around 26 to 28 cm in length. Chowchillas are characterized by their dark brown coloration on the upper parts of their bodies, a black head, and a blue-gray eye ring. Logrunners, on the other hand, display a patterned combination of olive, gray, and mottled black plumage. Male logrunners feature a white throat, while females have a rufous throat and upper breast.

== Behaviour and ecology ==
Logrunners are semi-terrestrial birds of weak flight. They are strictly carnivorous, with insects and larvae being their chief food, while the larger chowchilla will also eat small lizards. They find their food by digging in the soil, using their spiny tails as a support in the wet forest.

=== Social structure and breeding ===
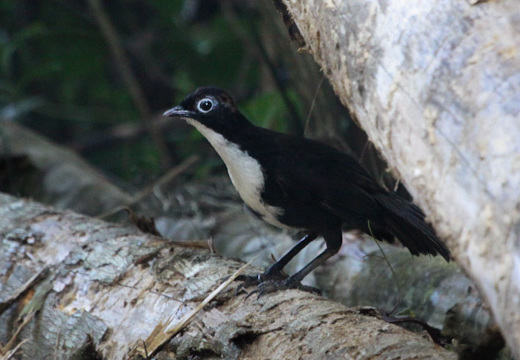
Male chowchilla, Orthonyx spaldingii

Logrunners have a somewhat unusual social structure. They are basically monogamous, but male offspring are often retained on the natal territory for more than a year after fledging. Despite this, only the female ever feeds the young; the much larger males stay primarily for the purpose of territorial defence and protecting the female from predation. Similar patterns of retention of young without alloparental care also occur in the speckled warbler, the corvid genus Perisoreus and the bustard genus Eupodotis.

Like the lyrebirds, logrunners typically breed in the southern winter from June to September, though this is often extended depending on weather conditions by a month or more. Both the chowchilla and the Papuan logrunner lay only one egg, while the Australian logrunner typically lays two though a few reports exist of clutches of one or even three. The eggs are very unusual in their tubular shape, and are pure white in colour, while the incubation period is among the longest for any songbird. The young generally become independent of the female in two to two and a half weeks, which is an exceptionally short time for an insectivorous altricial Australian bird, where parental dependence of forty to sixty days post-fledging is typical. This is probably why, unlike in birds of drier habitats in Australia, alloparental care is superfluous for rearing young and may actually increase the risk of predation. The nests are domed and constructed entirely of sticks, and are located on the ground below a tree. They have special coverings to prevent the extremely heavy downpours typical of the eastern Australian coast from damaging the egg(s).

Males are described as performing dancing antics like those of the lyrebirds.

=== Lifespan ===
In accordance with their nonseasonal, warm rainforest habitat, logrunners can be very long-lived. The chowchilla, the sole species with any banding data, has an average lifespan of around five years and has been known to live for seventeen.

== Distribution ==
The Australian logrunner lives in the humid lowland forest along the eastern coast of Australia. The Papuan logrunner is found in Indonesia and Papua New Guinea's tropical montane forests. Chowchillas live in the rainforests of northeastern Queensland.

== Bibliography ==
- Del Hoyo, J.; Elliot, A. & Christie D. (editors). (2007). Handbook of the Birds of the World. Volume 12: Picathartes to Tits and Chickadees. Lynx Edicions. ISBN 978-84-96553-42-2
