= Mudnester =

Mudnester can refer to any of the following species of birds:

- The magpie-lark
- A member of the bird family Corcoracidae
