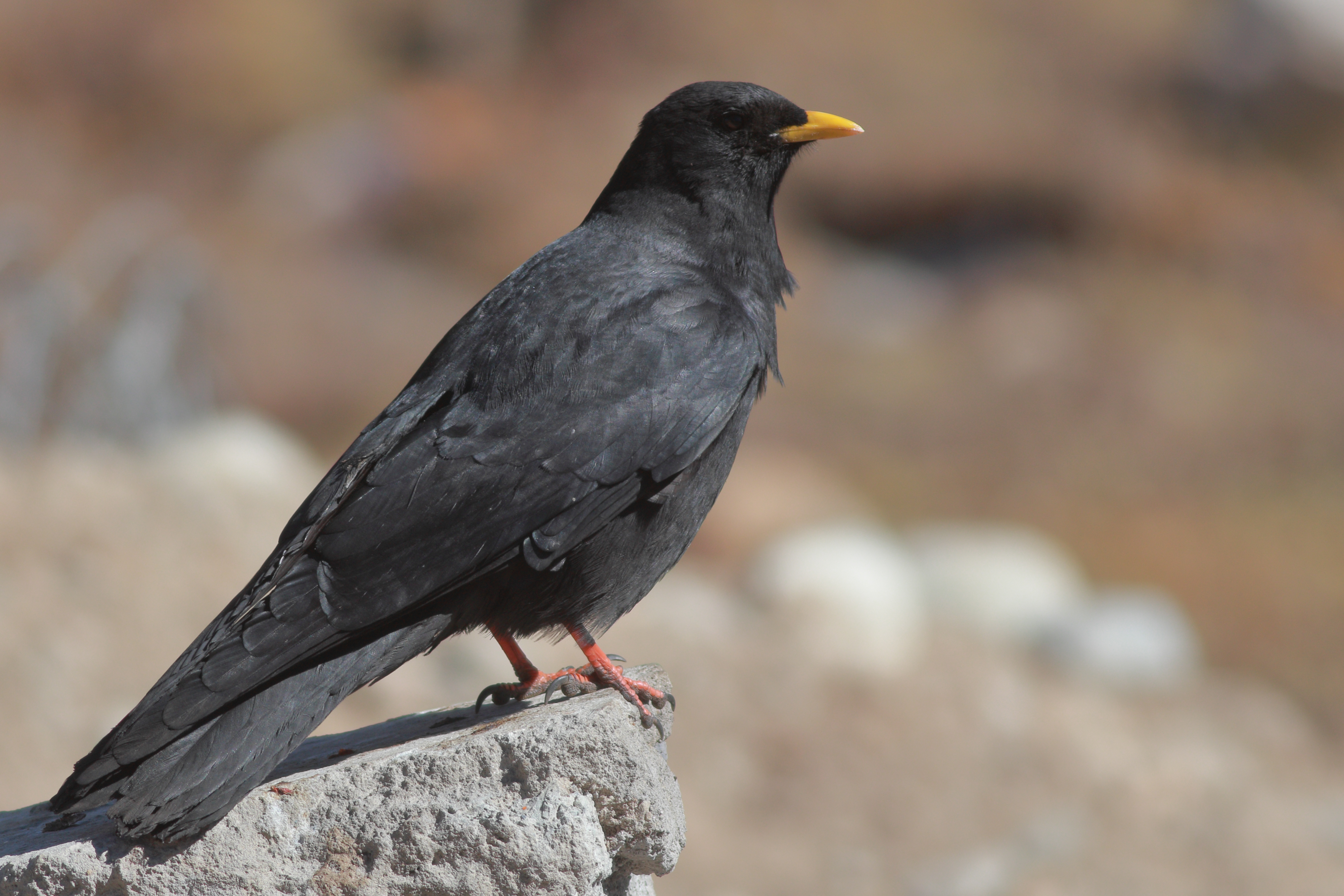
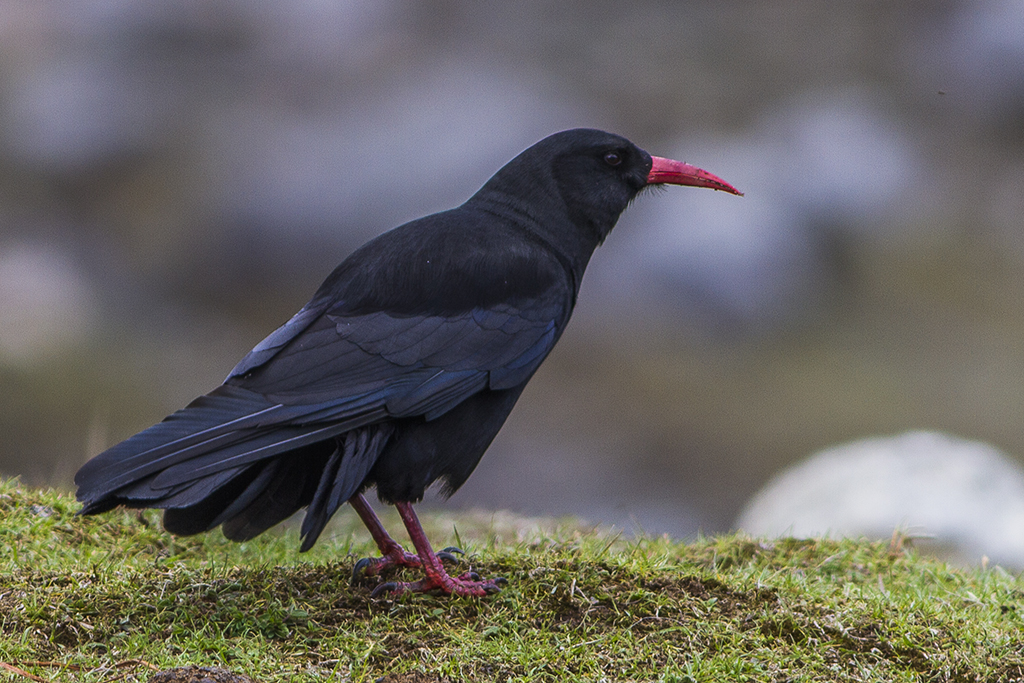
- Pyrrhocorax graculus Pyrrhocorax pyrrhocorax

Scientific classification
- Kingdom: Animalia
- Phylum: Chordata
- Class: Aves
- Order: Passeriformes
- Family: Corvidae
- Subfamily: Pyrrhocoracinae
- Genus: Pyrrhocorax; Tunstall, 1771

Type species
- Upupus pyrrhocorax Linnaeus, 1758

Species
- Alpine chough (Pyrrhocorax graculus); Red-billed chough (Pyrrhocorax pyrrhocorax)
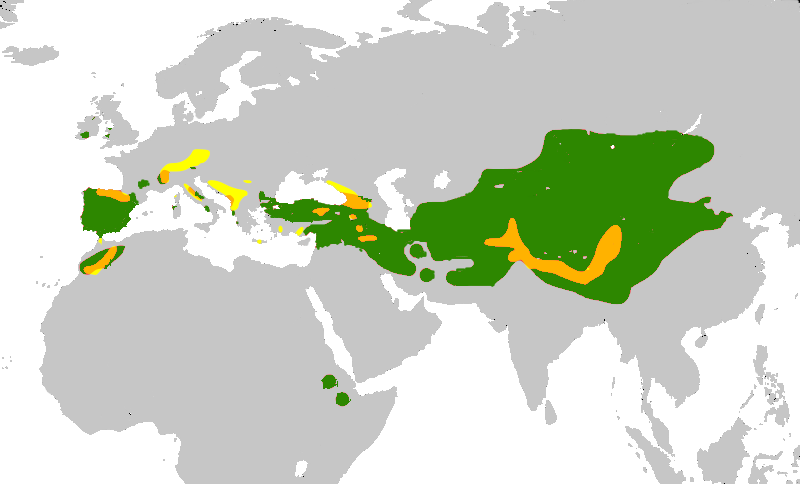
- Pyrrhocorax graculus Pyrrhocorax pyrrhocorax Both species

Audio
- Red-billed chough calls, recorded in Cardiganshire, Wales

= Chough =

Genus of birds

A chough (/tʃʌf/ CHUF) is any of two species of passerine birds that constitute the genus Pyrrhocorax of the Corvidae (crow) family. These are the Alpine chough (or yellow-billed chough) (Pyrrhocorax graculus) and the red-billed chough (Pyrrhocorax pyrrhocorax).

The choughs have black plumage and brightly coloured legs, feet and bills and are resident in the mountains and rocky sea-cliffs of southern Eurasia and North Africa. They have long broad wings and perform spectacular aerobatics. Both species pair for life and display fidelity to their breeding sites, which are usually caves or crevices in a cliff face. They build a lined stick nest and lay three to five eggs. They feed, usually in flocks, on short grazed grassland, taking mainly invertebrate prey, supplemented by vegetable material or food from human habitation, especially in winter.

Changes in agricultural practices, which have led to local population declines and range fragmentation, are the main threats to this genus, although neither species is threatened globally.

The white-winged chough of Australia, despite its name, is a member of the family Corcoracidae and only distantly related.

== Taxonomy ==
There are just two species in the genus, red-billed chough and alpine chough. The first to be described was the red-billed chough, named as Upupa pyrrhocorax by Linnaeus in his Systema Naturae in 1758. His genus Upupa contained species that had a long curved bill and a short blunt tongue. These included the northern bald ibis and the hoopoe, birds now known to be completely unrelated to the choughs.

The Alpine chough was described as Corvus graculus by Linnaeus in the 1766 edition of the Systema Naturae. Although Corvus is the crow genus to which the choughs' relatives belong, the English ornithologist Marmaduke Tunstall considered the chough to be sufficiently distinct to be moved to the a genus, Pyrrhocorax, which he described in his 1771 Ornithologia Britannica. The genus name is derived from Ancient Greek purrhos (πύρρος, "flame-coloured") and korax (κόραξ, "Raven, crow").

The fossil record from the Pleistocene of Europe includes a form similar to the Alpine chough, and sometimes categorised as an extinct subspecies of that bird, and a prehistoric form of the red-billed chough, P. p. primigenius. There are eight generally recognised extant subspecies of red-billed chough, and two of Alpine, although all differ only slightly from the nominate forms. The greater subspecies diversity in the red-billed species arises from an early divergence of the Asian and geographically isolated Ethiopian races from the western forms.

Traditionally, the closest relatives of the choughs have been thought to be the jackdaws Coloeus and the typical crows Corvus, but more recent genetic studies have suggested the choughs are basal to a group of Asian jay genera (Crypsirina, Dendrocitta, Platysmurus, Temnurus), or most recently, basal in the entire Corvidae. The genus Pyrrhocorax species differ from Corvus in that they have brightly coloured bills and feet, smooth, not scaled tarsi, and very short, dense nasal feathers. Choughs have uniformly black plumage, lacking any paler areas as seen in some of their relatives.

The two Pyrrhocorax are the main hosts of two specialist chough fleas, Frontopsylla frontalis and F. laetus, not normally found on other corvids.

=== Etymology ===
"Chough" was originally an alternative onomatopoeic name for the jackdaw (Coloeus monedula) based on its call. The similar red-billed chough, formerly particularly common in Cornwall, became known initially as "Cornish chough" and then just "chough", the name transferring from one species to the other.

The Australian white-winged chough (Corcorax melanorhamphos), despite its similar shape and habits, is in a separate family Corcoracidae only moderately related to the Corvidae and not notably to the true choughs, and is an example of convergent evolution.

== Distribution and habitat ==
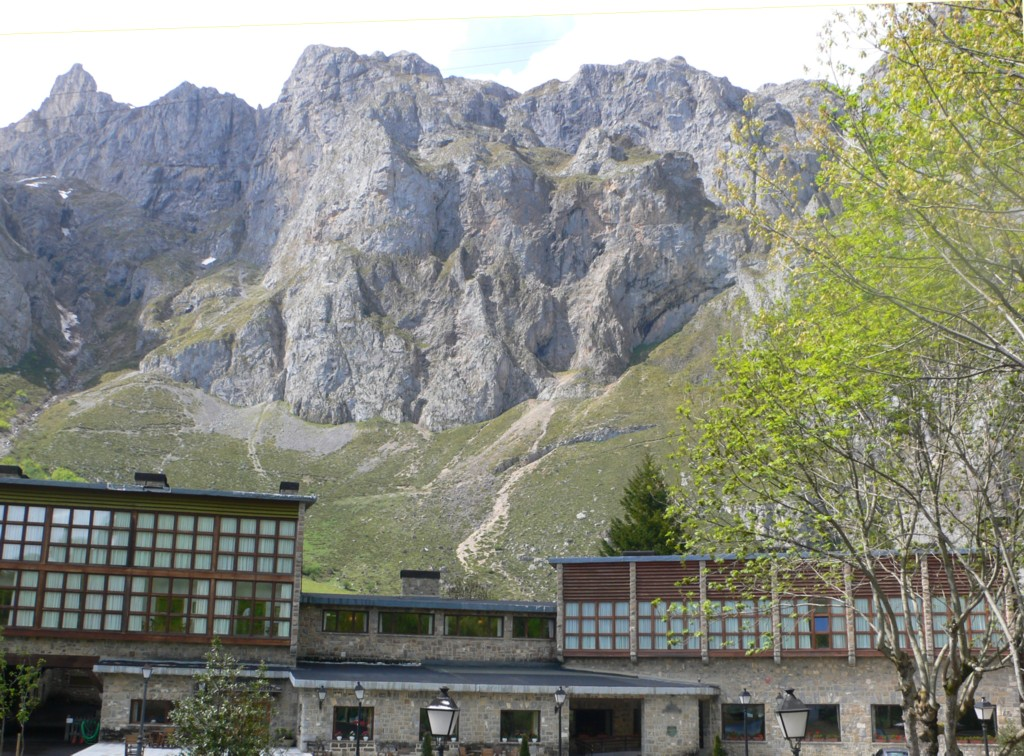
Both chough species breed in the Picos de Europa

Choughs breed in mountains, from Morocco and Spain eastwards through southern Europe and the Alps, across Central Asia and the Himalayas to western China. The Alpine chough is also found in Corsica and Crete and the red-billed chough has populations in Ireland, the UK, the Isle of Man, Brittany and two areas of the Ethiopian Highlands. Both species are non-migratory residents throughout their range, only occasionally wandering to neighbouring countries.

These birds are mountain specialists, although red-billed choughs also use coastal sea cliffs in Ireland, Great Britain and Brittany, feeding on adjacent short grazed grassland or machair; the small population on La Palma, one of the Canary Islands, is also coastal. The red-billed chough more typically breeds in mountains above 1,200 m (3,900 ft) in Europe, 2,000 m (6,600 ft) in North Africa and 2,400 m (7,900 ft) in the Himalayas. In that mountain range it reaches 6,000 metres (20,000 ft) in the summer, and has been recorded at 7,950 metres (26,080 ft) altitude on Mount Everest. The Alpine chough breeds above 1,260 m (4,130 ft) in Europe, 2,880 m (9,450 ft) in Morocco, and 3,500 m (11,500 ft) in the Himalayas. It has nested at 6,500 m (21,300 ft), higher than any other bird species, and it has been observed following mountaineers ascending Mount Everest at an altitude of 8,200 m (26,900 ft).

Where the two species occur in the same mountains, the Alpine species tends to breed at a higher elevation than its relative, since it is better adapted for a diet at high altitudes.

== Description ==
The choughs are medium-sized corvids; the red-billed chough is 39–40 centimetres (15–16 in) in length with a 73–90 centimetres (29–35 in) wingspan, and the Alpine chough averages slightly smaller at 37–39 (14.5–15.5 in) length with a 75–85 cm (30–33 in) wingspan. These birds have black plumage similar to that of many Corvus crows, but they are readily distinguished from members of that genus by their brightly coloured bills and legs. The Alpine chough has a yellow bill and the red-billed chough has a long, curved, red bill; both species have red legs as adults. The sexes are similar, but the juvenile of each species has a duller bill and legs than the adult and its plumage lacks the glossiness seen in older birds. Other physical distinctions are summarised in the table below.

Physical measurements and identification
Feature	Red-billed chough	Alpine chough
Weight	285–380 g	191–244 g
Wing	249–304 mm	250–274 mm
Tail	126–145 mm	150–167 mm
Tarsus	55–59 mm	41–48 mm
Bill	41–56 mm	31–37 mm
Bill colour	Red	Yellow
Appearance in flight: the red-billed chough has deeper primary feather "fingers" and a shorter tail than the Alpine chough.	Flying red-billed chough silhouetted against the sky	Flying Alpine chough silhouetted against the sky

The two choughs are distinguishable from each other by their bill colour, and in flight the long broad wings and short tail of the red-billed give it a silhouette quite different from its slightly smaller yellow-billed relative. Both species fly with loose deep wing beats, and frequently use their manoeuvrability to perform acrobatic displays, soaring in the updraughts at cliff faces then diving and rolling with fanned tail and folded wings.

The red-billed chough's loud, ringing chee-ow call is similar in character to that of other corvids, particularly the jackdaw, although it is clearer and louder than the call of that species. In contrast, the Alpine chough has rippling preep and whistled sweeeooo calls quite unlike the crows. Small subspecies of both choughs have higher frequency calls than larger races, as predicted by the inverse relationship between body size and frequency.

== Behaviour and ecology ==
=== Breeding ===
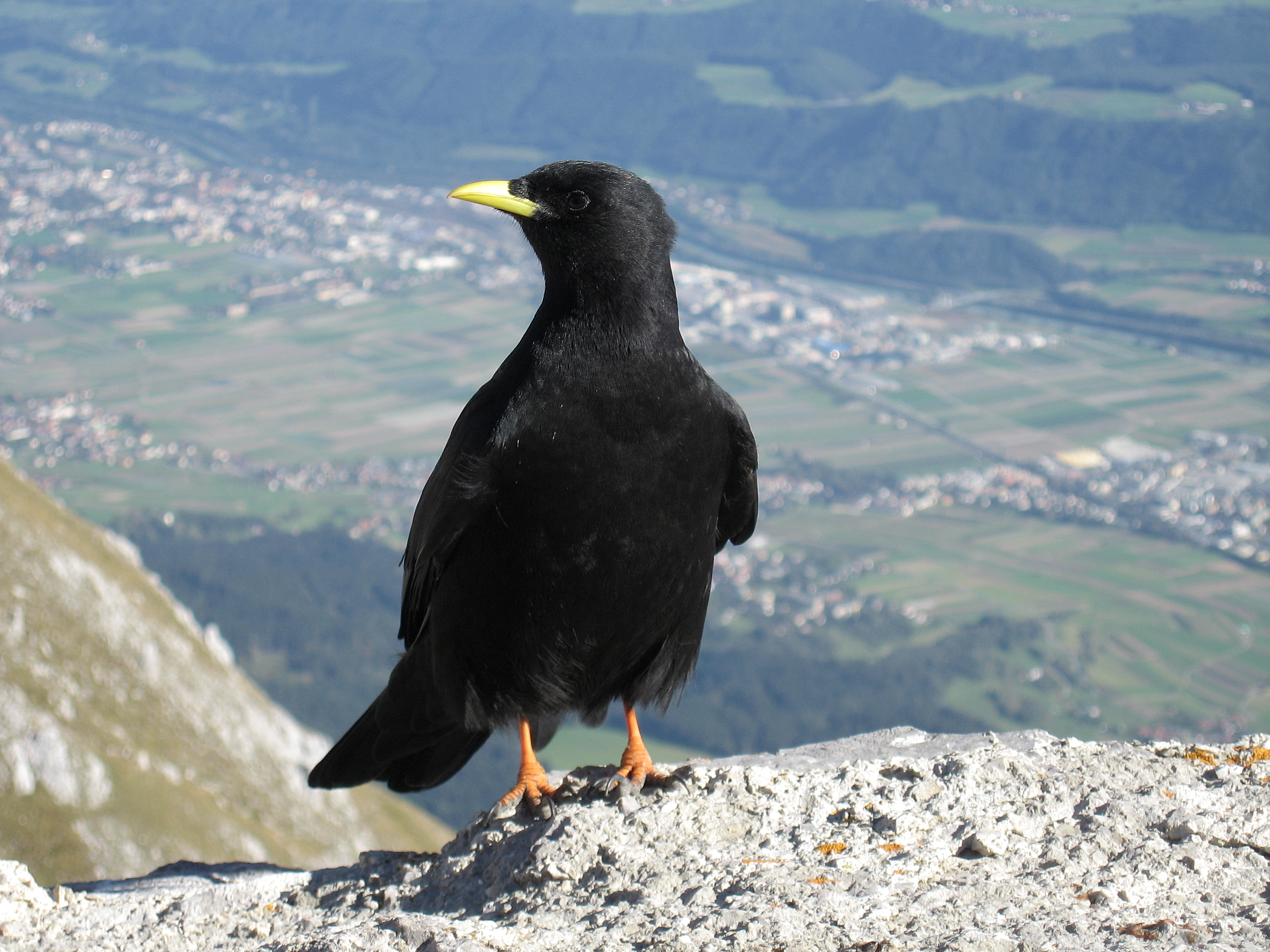
Alpine choughs breed in high mountains in much of southern Eurasia.

Choughs are monogamous, and show high partner and site fidelity. Both species build a bulky nest of roots, sticks and plant stems lined with grass, fine twiglets or hair. It is constructed on a ledge, in a cave or similar fissure in a cliff face, or in man-made locations like abandoned buildings, quarries or dams. Red-billed will also sometimes use occupied buildings such as Mongolian monasteries. The choughs are not colonial, although in suitable habitat several pairs may nest in close proximity.

Both species lay 3–5 normally whitish eggs blotched with brown or grey, which are incubated by the female alone. The chicks hatch after two to three weeks. Red-billed chough chicks are almost naked, but the chicks of the higher altitude Alpine chough hatch with a dense covering of natal down. The chicks are fed by both parents and fledge in 29–31 days after hatching for Alpine chough, and 31–41 days for red-billed.

The Alpine chough lays its eggs about one month later than its relative, although breeding success and reproductive behaviour are similar. The similarities between the two species presumably arose because of the same strong environmental constraints on breeding behaviour. The first-year survival rate of the juvenile red-billed chough is 72.5 percent, and for the Alpine it is 77%. The annual adult survival rate is 83–92% for Alpine, but is unknown for red-billed.

=== Feeding ===
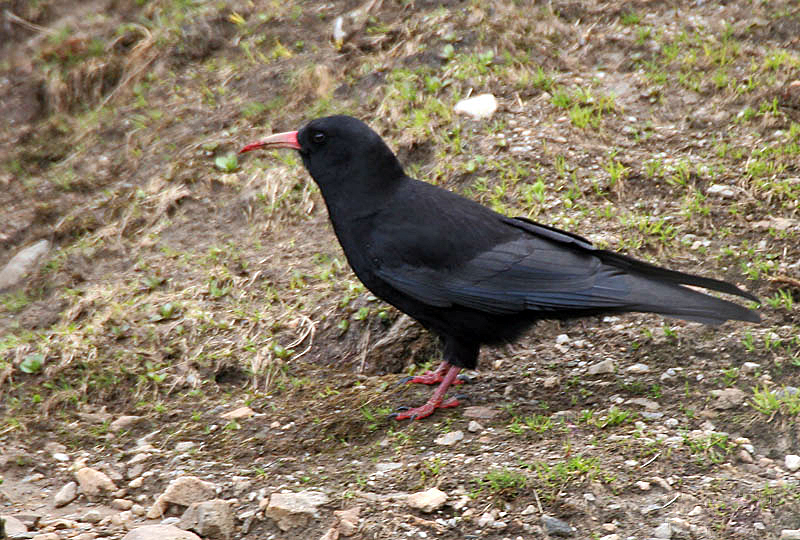
Red-billed chough feeding in the Himalayas

In the summer, both choughs feed mainly on invertebrates such as beetles, snails, grasshoppers, caterpillars, and fly larvae. Ants are a favoured food of the red-billed chough. Prey items are taken from short grazed pasture, or in the case of coastal populations of red-billed chough, areas where plant growth is hindered by exposure to coastal salt spray or poor soils. The chough's bill may be used to pick insects off the surface, or to dig for grubs and other invertebrates. The red-billed chough typically excavates to 2–3 cm (0.79–1.18 in) in the thin soils of its feeding areas, but it may dig to 10–20 cm (3.9–7.9 in) in suitable conditions.

Plant matter is also eaten, and red-billed chough will take fallen grain where the opportunity arises; it has been reported as damaging barley crops by breaking off the ripening heads to extract the corn. Alpine choughs rely more on fruit and berries at times of year when animal prey is limited, and will readily supplement their winter diet with food provided by tourist activities in mountain regions, including ski resorts, refuse dumps and picnic areas. Both Pyrrhocorax species feed in flocks on open areas, often some distance from the breeding cliffs, particularly in winter. Feeding trips may cover 20 km (12 mi) distance and 1,600 m (5,200 ft) in altitude. In the Alps, the development of skiing above 3,000 m (9,800 ft) has enabled more Alpine choughs to remain at high levels in winter.

Where their ranges overlap, the two chough species may feed together in the summer, although there is only limited competition for food. An Italian study showed that the vegetable part of the winter diet for the red-billed chough was almost exclusively Gagea bulbs, whilst the Alpine chough took berries and hips. In June, red-billed choughs fed mainly on caterpillars whereas Alpine choughs ate cranefly pupae. Later in the summer, the Alpine chough consumed large numbers of grasshoppers, while the red-billed chough added cranefly pupae, fly larvae and beetles to its diet. In the eastern Himalayas in November, Alpine choughs occur mainly in Juniper forests where they feed on juniper berries, differing ecologically from the red-billed choughs in the same region and at the same time of year, which dig for food in the soil of the villages' terraced pastures.

=== Natural threats ===
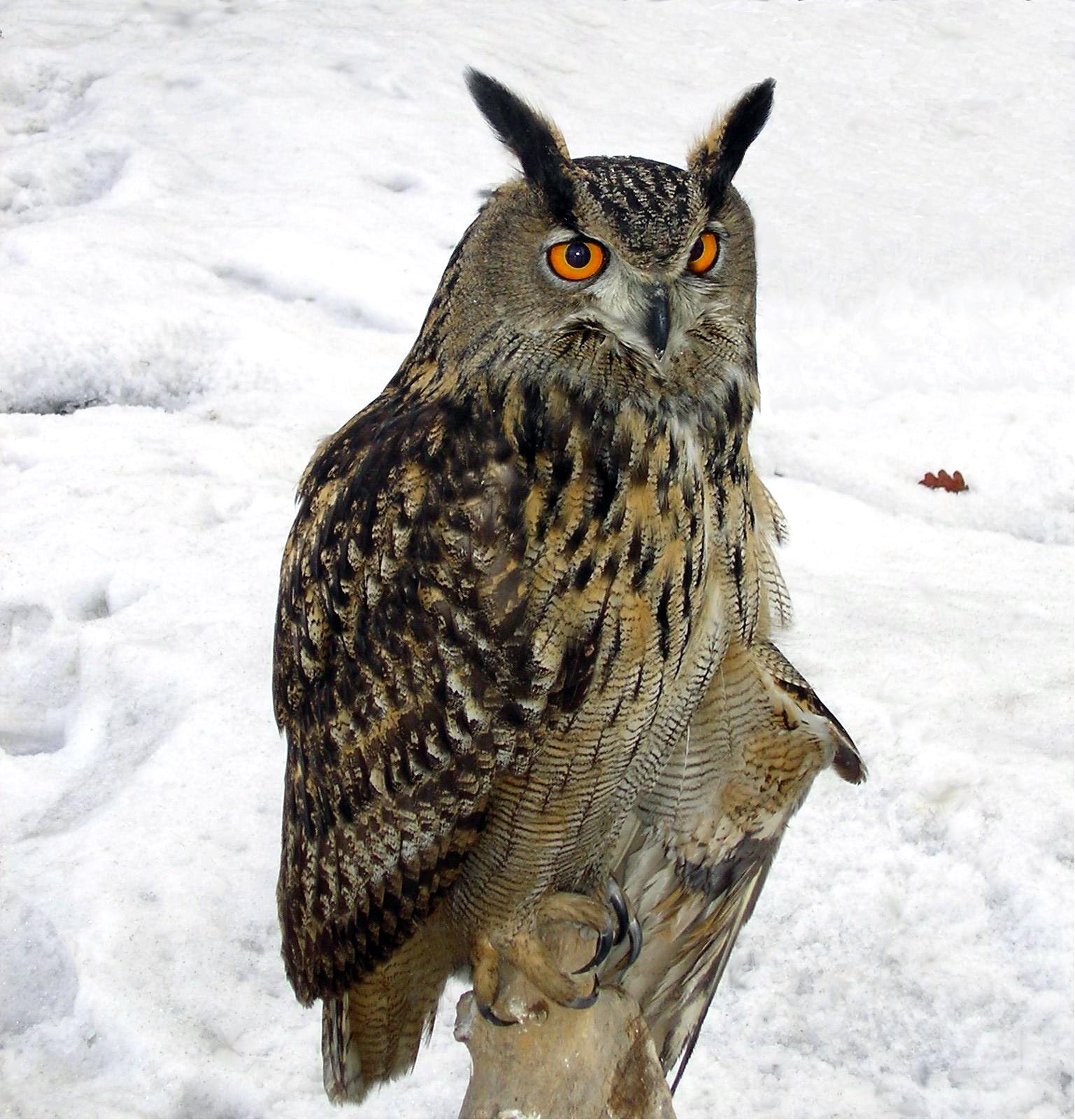
The Eurasian eagle owl is a predator of choughs.

Predators of the choughs include the peregrine falcon, golden eagle, and the Eurasian eagle-owl. The common raven will take nestlings. In northern Spain red-billed choughs prefer to nest near lesser kestrel colonies. This falcon, which eats mainly insects, provides a degree of protection against larger predators and the chough benefits in terms of a higher breeding success. The red-billed chough is occasionally parasitised by the great spotted cuckoo, a brood parasite for which the Eurasian magpie is the primary host.

The choughs host bird fleas, including two Frontopsylla species, which are Pyrrhocorax specialist. Other parasites recorded on choughs include a cestode Choanotaenia pirinica, and various species of chewing lice in the genera Brueelia, Menacanthus and Philopterus. Blood parasites such as Plasmodium have been found in red-billed choughs, but this is uncommon and apparently does little harm. Parasitism levels are much lower than in some other passerine groups.

== Status ==
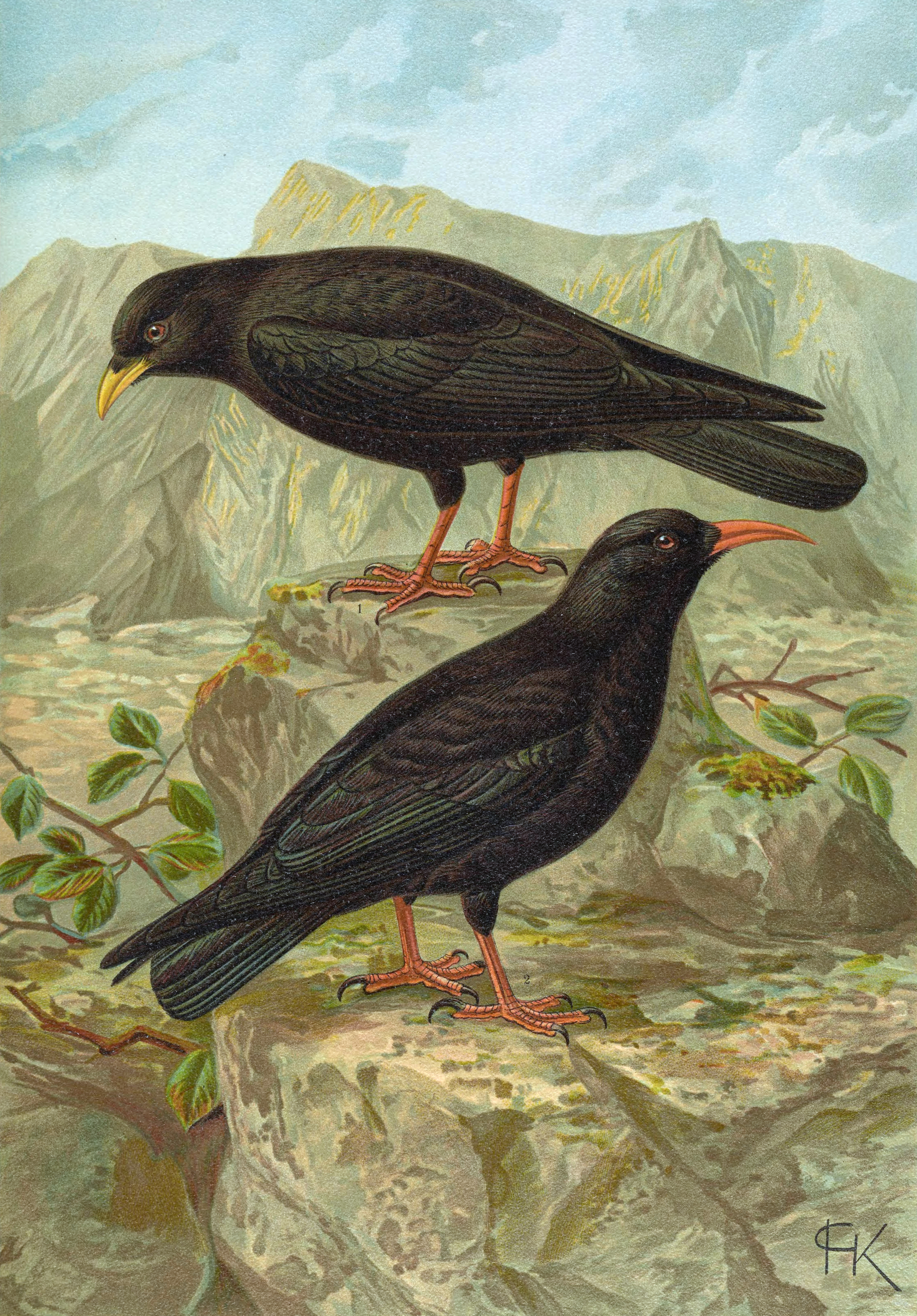
Illustration by J. G. Keulemans, 1896

Both Pyrrhocorax species have extensive geographical ranges and large populations; neither is thought to approach the thresholds for the global population decline criteria of the IUCN Red List (i.e., declining more than 30% in ten years or three generations), and they are therefore evaluated as being of Least Concern. However, some populations, particularly on islands such as Corsica and La Palma are small and isolated.

Both choughs occupied more extensive ranges in the past, reaching to more southerly and lower altitude areas than at present, with the Alpine chough breeding in Europe as far south as southern Italy, and both the decline and range fragmentation continue. Red-billed choughs have lost ground in most of Europe, and Alpine choughs have lost many breeding sites in the east of the continent. In the Canary Islands, the red-billed chough is now extinct on two of the islands on which it formerly bred, and the Alpine was lost from the archipelago altogether.

The causes of the decline include the fragmentation and loss of open grasslands to scrub or human activities such as the construction of ski resorts, and a longer-term threat comes from global warming which would cause the species' preferred Alpine climate zone to shift to higher, more restricted areas, or locally to disappear entirely.

The red-billed chough, which breeds at lower levels, has been more affected by human activity, and the declines away from its main Alpine breeding areas have seen it categorised as "vulnerable" in Europe. Only in Spain is it still common, and it has recently expanded its range in that country by nesting in old buildings in areas close to its traditional mountain breeding sites.

== In culture ==
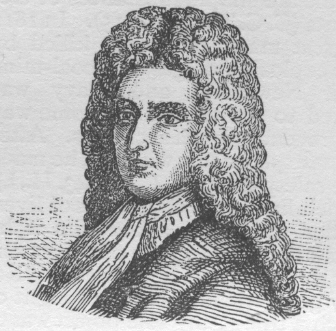
Daniel Defoe recorded the myth of the fire-raising red-billed chough

Although these are mainly mountain species with limited interactions with humans, the red-billed chough has a coastal population in the far west of its range, and has cultural connections particularly with Cornwall, where it appears on the county's Coat of Arms. A legend from that county says that King Arthur did not die but was transformed into a red-billed chough, and hence killing this bird was unlucky.

The red-billed chough was formerly reputed to be a habitual thief of small objects from houses, including burning wood or lighted candles, which it would use to set fire to haystacks or thatched roofs.

As a high altitude species with limited contact with humans until the development of mountain tourism activities, the Alpine chough has little cultural significance. It was, however, featured together with its wild mountain habitat in Olivier Messiaen's Catalogue d'oiseaux ("Bird catalogue"), a piano piece written in 1956–58. Le chocard des alpes ("The Alpine Chough") is the opening piece of Book 1 of the work.

A group of choughs may be referred to fancifully or jocularly as a chattering or clattering. (See also: List of collective nouns)
