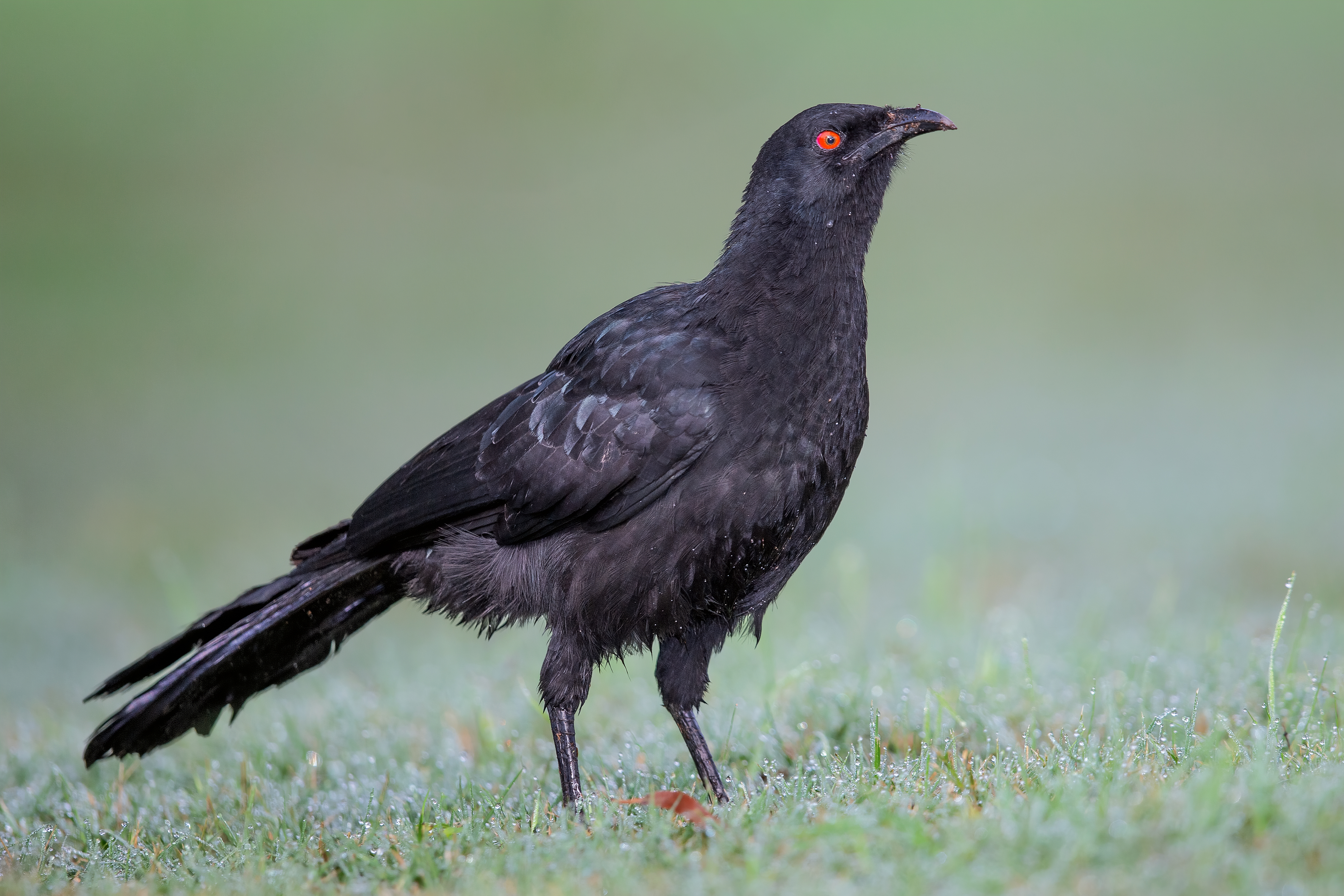

Conservation status
- Least Concern (IUCN 3.1)

Scientific classification
- Kingdom: Animalia
- Phylum: Chordata
- Class: Aves
- Order: Passeriformes
- Family: Corcoracidae
- Genus: Corcorax; Lesson, 1831
- Species: C. melanorhamphos

Binomial name
- Corcorax melanorhamphos (Vieillot, 1817)

= White-winged chough =

Species of Australian bird

The white-winged chough (Corcorax melanorhamphos) is one of only two surviving species of the Australian mud-nest builders family, Corcoracidae, and is the only member of the genus Corcorax. It is native to southern and eastern Australia and is an example of convergent evolution as it is only distantly related to the European choughs that it closely resembles in shape, and for which it was named.

== Taxonomy ==
The white-winged chough was first described by French naturalist Louis Pierre Vieillot in 1817 as Coracia melanorhamphos, other names given include Pyrrhocorax leucopterus by Dutch zoologist Coenraad Jacob Temminck in 1820, and Corcorax australis by French naturalist René Lesson in 1830. before the current name was settled by Gregory Mathews in 1912. The specific epithet is derived from the Ancient Greek words melano- 'black' and rhamphos 'beak'.

It is placed in the family known as the mud-nest builders or Corcoracidae, written as Grallinidae in older books before the removal of the genus Grallina to the family Monarchidae. It is one of two remaining species, with the apostlebird (Struthidea cinerea), which differs in appearance but exhibits many behavioural similarities. The mudnest builder family Corcoracidae itself is now placed in a narrower 'Core corvine' group, which contains the crows and ravens, shrikes, birds of paradise, fantails, monarch flycatchers, and drongos.

It is only distantly related to the red-billed chough (Pyrrhocorax pyrrhocorax) and Alpine chough (P. graculus), which are members of the crow family Corvidae. The similarities in appearance of dark plumage and downturned bill are the result of convergent evolution.

== Description ==
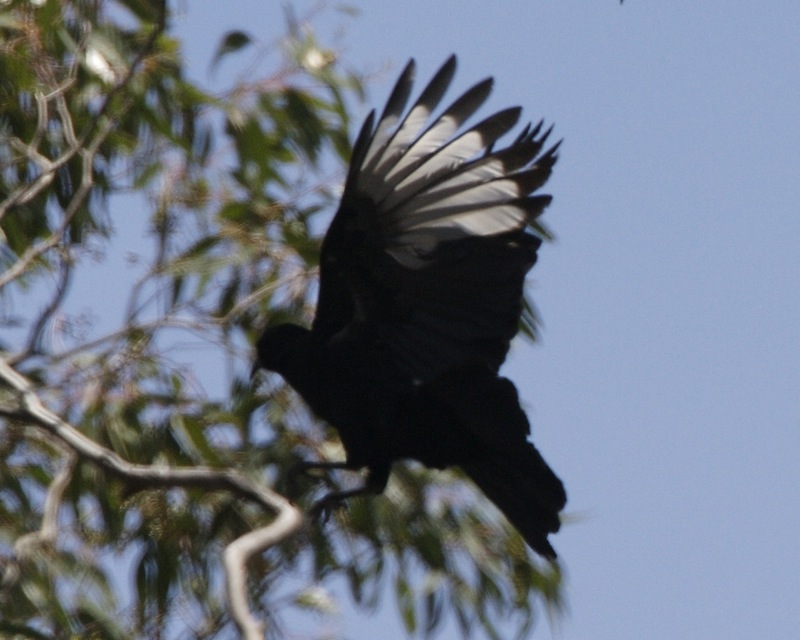
Landing on a branch in Brisbane Ranges National Park, Australia

White-winged choughs are easily recognised but often mistaken for "crows" (such as the Australian raven). The white-winged chough is a large, black bird—at about 45 cm (18 in) only a little smaller than a raven or a little larger than an Australian magpie—but has red eyes and a finer, slightly down-curved beak, similar to a European chough. These red eyes become swollen and brighter in colour when the bird is excited. In flight the large white patches in the wings are immediately obvious, and explain the descriptive part of their common name.

Their calls consist primarily of a grating alarm call and a descending piping call. The latter call is diagnostic for the bird in the wild, being significantly different in timbre and melody to that of other birds sharing their habitat.

== Behaviour ==
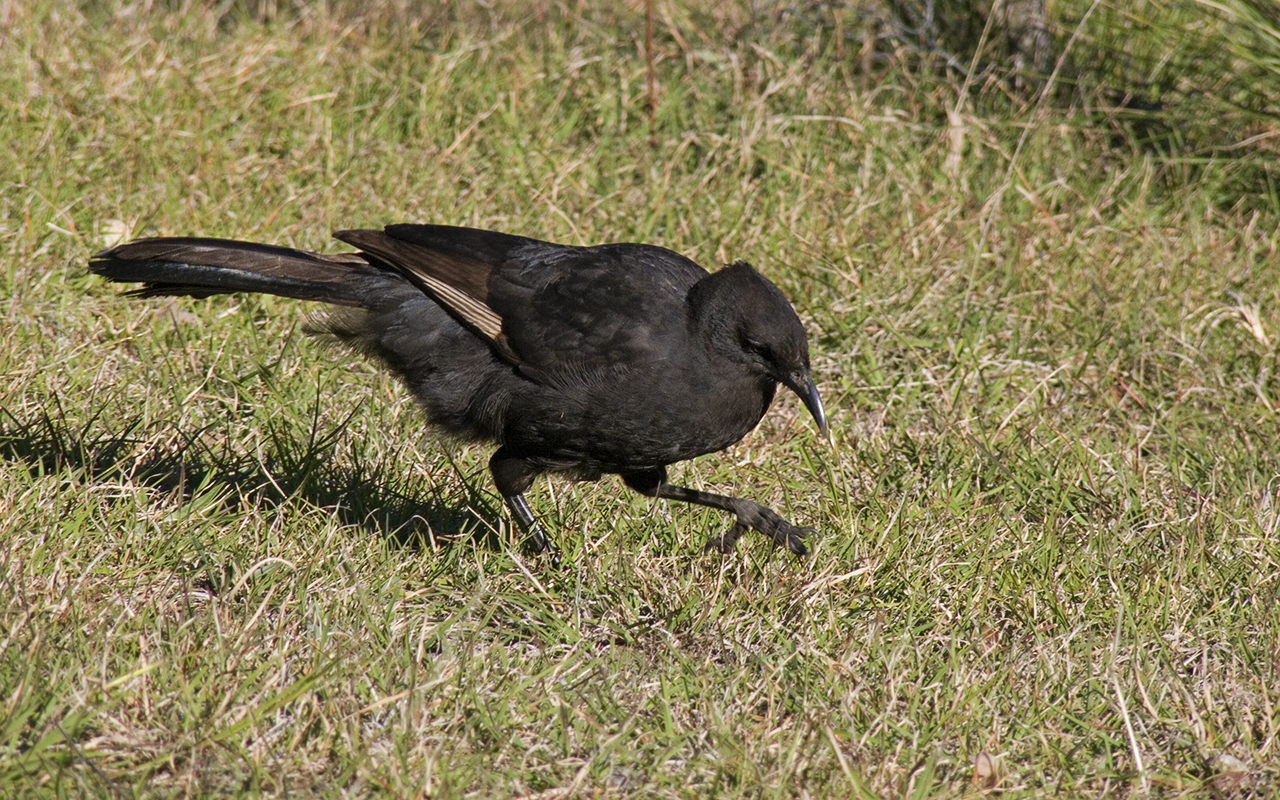
On the search for food in short grass

The flight of C. melanorhamphos is a mixture of a slow, deep flapping and short glides. Compared to their European namesakes, they are not as strong or agile of fliers and spend a majority of their time on the ground, foraging methodically through leaf litter for worms, insects, grain, and snails in a group. They walk in a distinctive swaying motion, and call softly to one another every few seconds. A large cache, if found, is communicated via vocalizations to other members of the group. The family group walks several kilometres each day through its large territory, foraging as it goes. They take to the air only if disturbed.

Choughs are territorial and highly social, living in flocks of from about 4 up to about 20 birds, usually all the offspring of a single pair. Because raising of young is a group effort, bands of chough may kidnap fledglings from other family groups so that they will be able to help them to raise their chicks next year.

=== Feeding ===
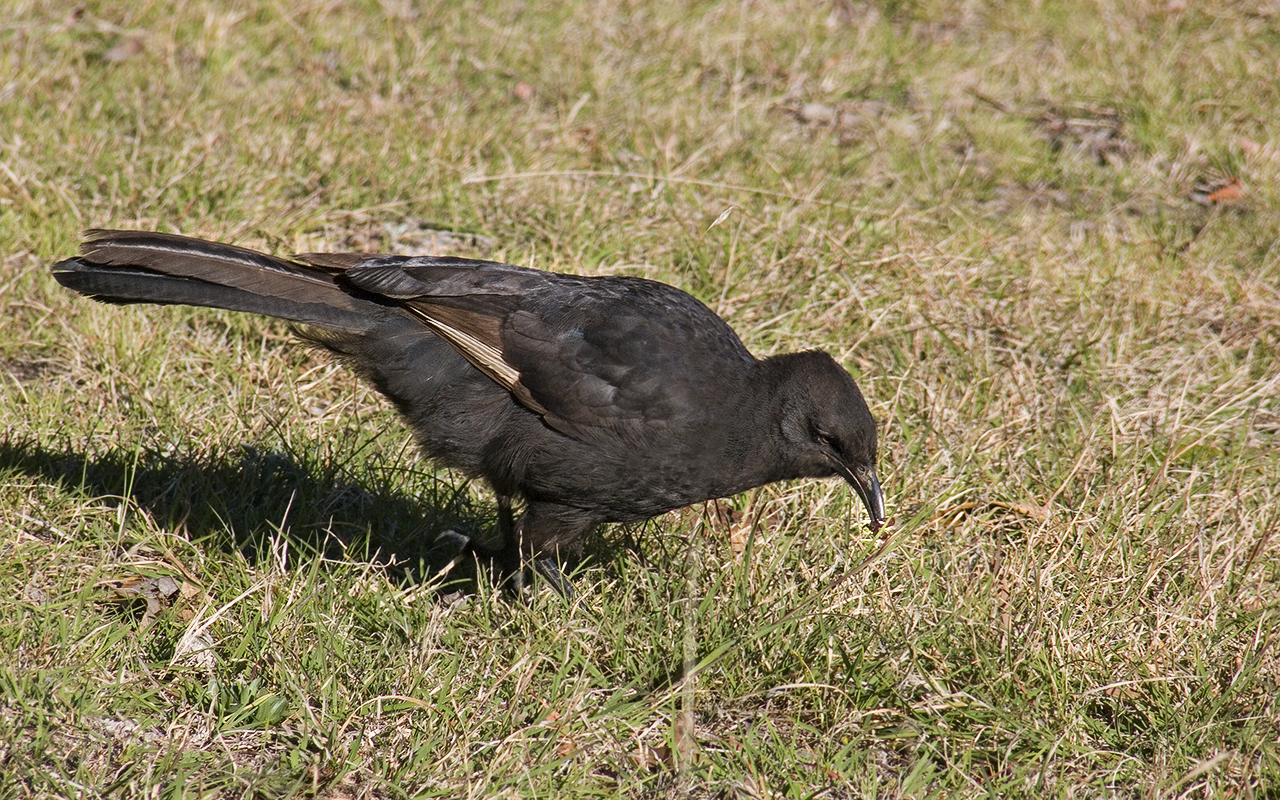
Foraging in short grass this bird has found a small beetle

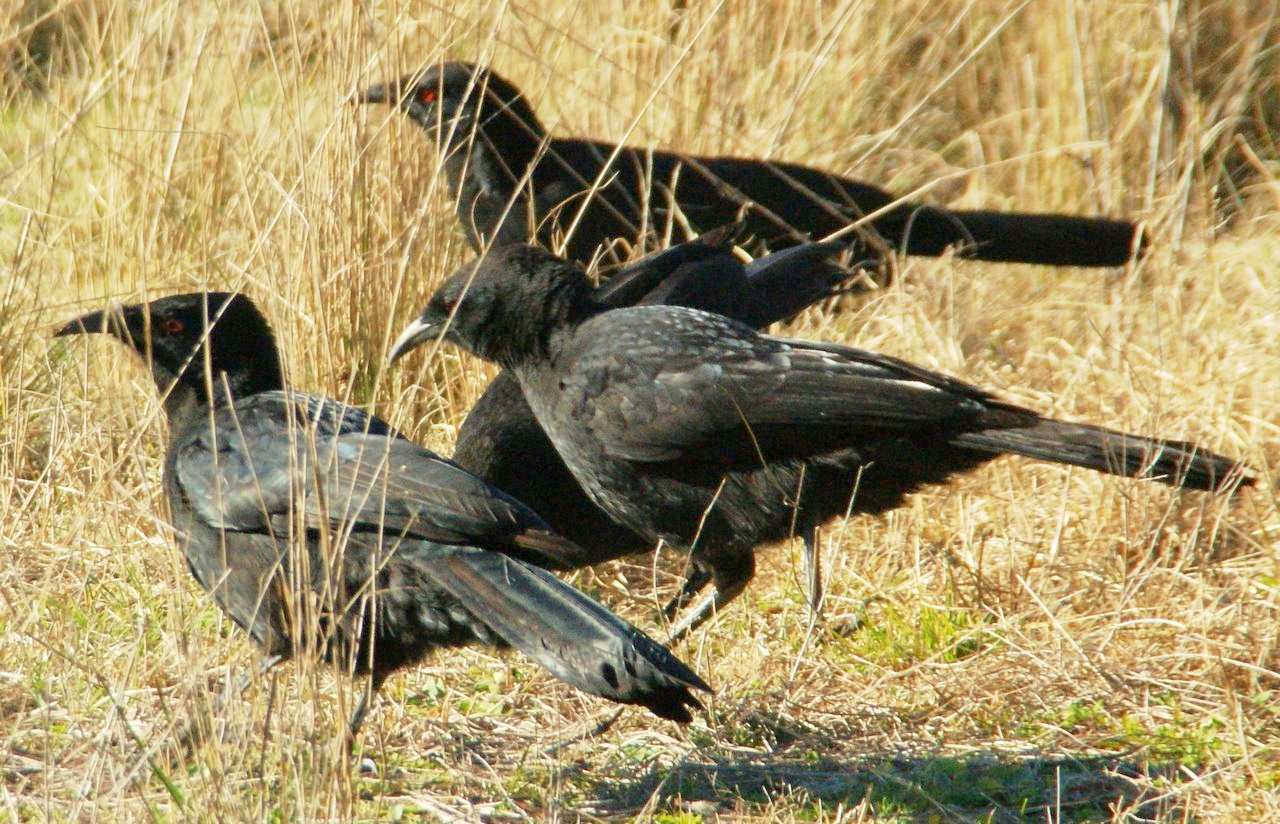
A group searching for food

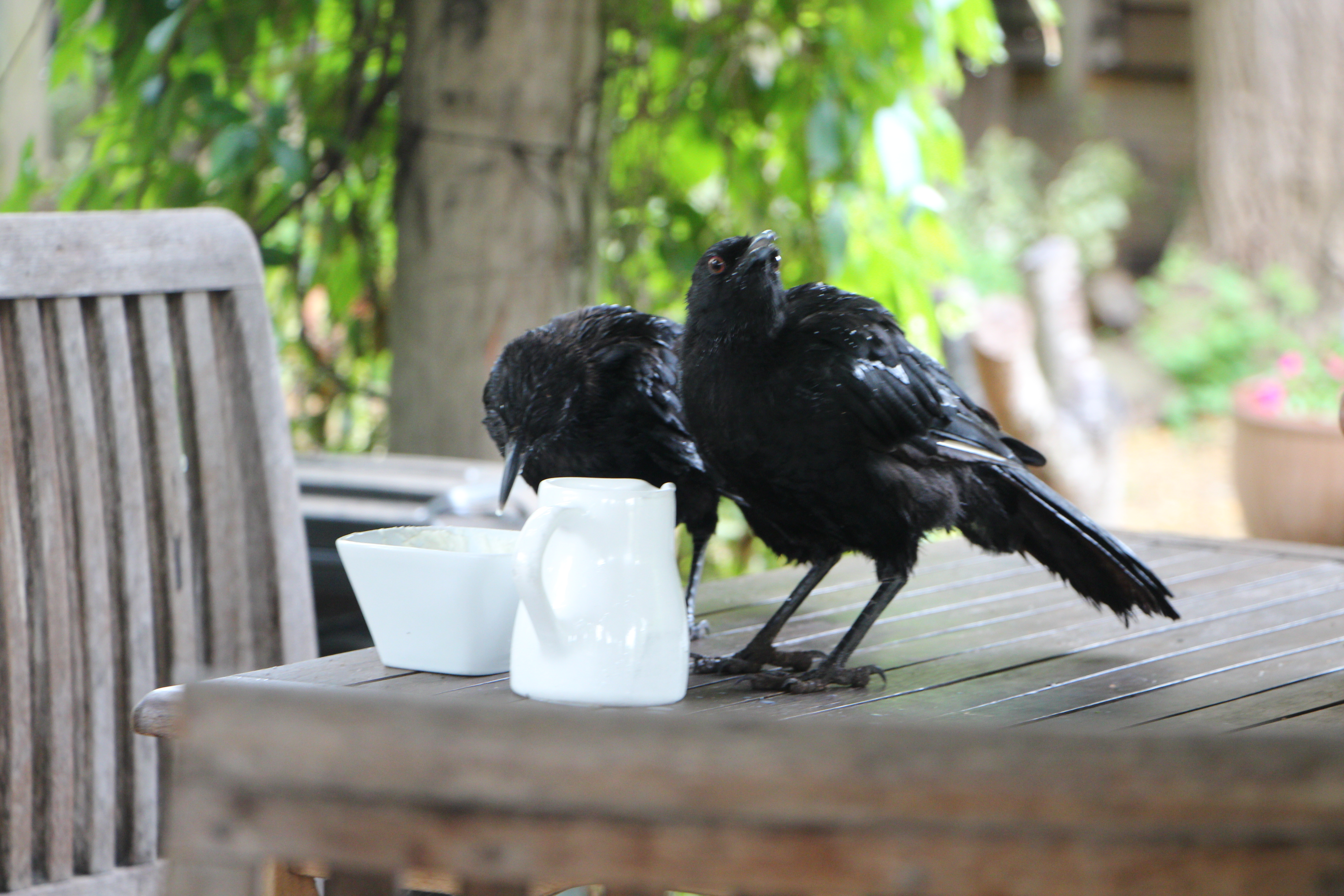
White-winged choughs helping themselves to leftover cream and milk at an outdoor café in the Megalong Valley.

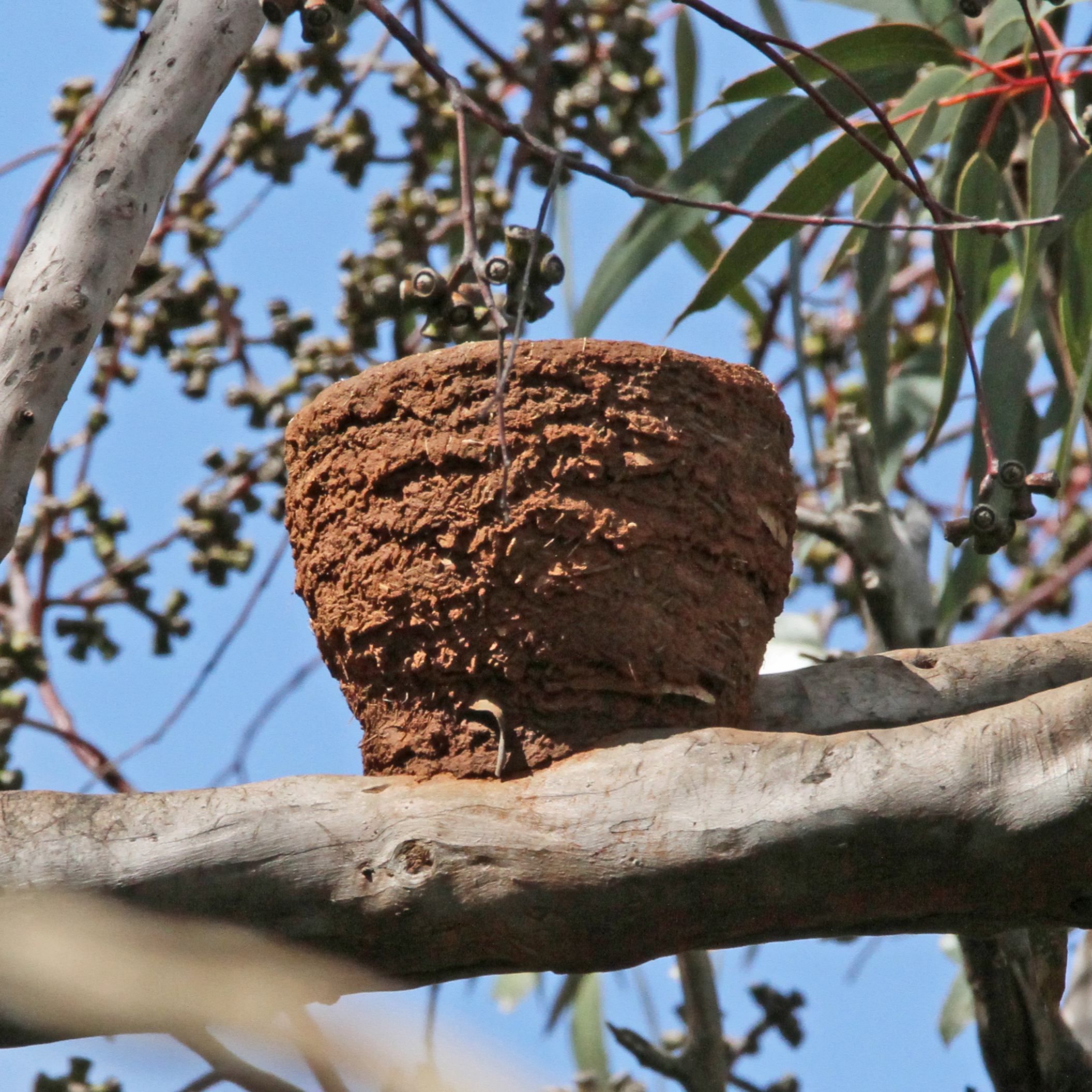
Nest in Binya State Forest, New South Wales, Australia

The white-winged chough will forage in litter and rotten wood for termites and beetles. Although birds have eaten pieces of apple placed out for them on feeding tables, they have not been recorded eating fruit on trees. This species has been observed eating cherry tomatoes, whole, in eastern Australia, Newcastle region.

The diet is varied; the white-winged chough eats seeds of various grasses (Poaceae), Gahnia grandis, Atriplex, Epacris, Hibbertia, Solanum, Acacia and Exocarpos species, as well as introduced species such as the cursed thistle (Cirsium arvense), roadside thistle (C. vulgare), winter honeysuckle (Lonicera fragrantissima), Convolvulus and Oxalis species. Berries of the introduced Cotoneaster and Crataegus are also consumed. It eats a wide variety of arthropods, including centipedes, millipedes and many types of insect—beetles, cockroaches, termites, grasshoppers and crickets, flies, butterflies and moths, and ants, bees and wasps. In some areas, it will readily approach tourist sites to find supplementary food.

=== Breeding ===
Nesting and breeding is communal, all members of the family helping to raise the young - a process that takes several years, as young birds must learn the art of finding food in the dry Australian bush. Larger families have a better chance of breeding success: so much so that given the opportunity choughs will kidnap the youngsters of neighboring families in order to recruit them to the team.

Breeding season is from August to December. The nest is a deep cup-shaped structure made of grasses held together with mud or sometimes manure in a tree fork up to 10 metres above the ground. Three to five cream-coloured eggs sparsely splotched with dark brown and lavender shades are laid measuring 30 mm x 40 mm.

There is one report of white-winged choughs occupying and using a nest which was likely to have been built by the Australian magpie. However, this was unable to be confirmed as the nest was not witnessed being built.

All members of a family take turns to incubate, preen, and feed youngsters, and all cooperate in defending the nest against predators. However, the juveniles, who are highly inefficient foragers, have been observed to engage in deception; they bring food back to the nest and make to feed nestlings, but instead wait until unobserved, and then eat it themselves. This behaviour disappeared when food sources were artificially supplemented. There are three main threats to young choughs: starvation; predation by nest-robbing birds, particularly currawongs; and sabotage by neighbouring chough families anxious to protect their food supply by restricting competition. Larger family groups are better able to deal with all three threats.

Nesting in communal groups is essential: pairs, or even trios, of birds are almost never successful in raising young. Young take six to seven months to reach independence – a significant time-span for birds – but they repay the long investment by returning to the nest the next year and helping raise the next generation.
