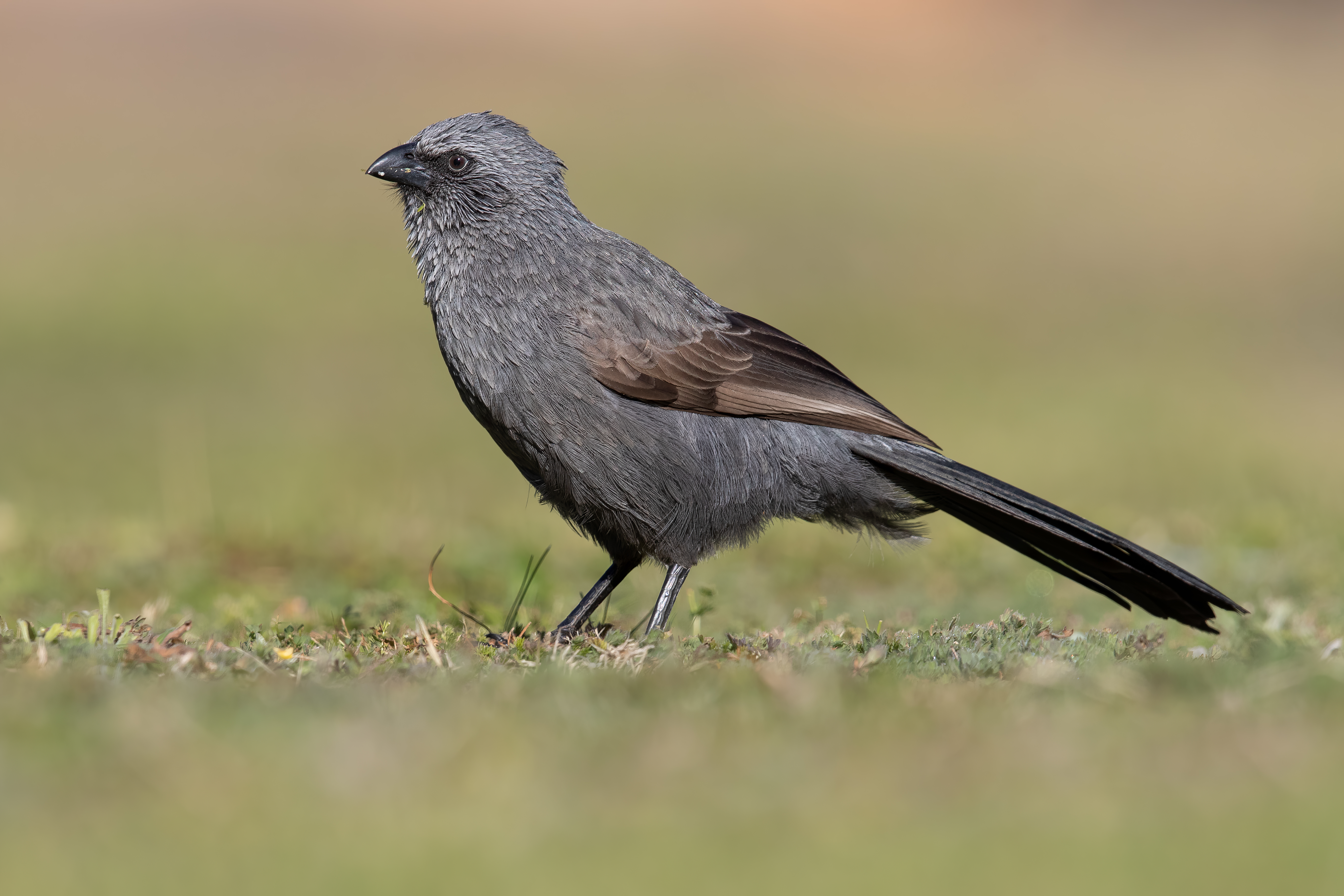

Conservation status
- Least Concern (IUCN 3.1)

Scientific classification
- Kingdom: Animalia
- Phylum: Chordata
- Class: Aves
- Order: Passeriformes
- Family: Corcoracidae
- Genus: Struthidea; Gould, 1837
- Species: S. cinerea

Binomial name
- Struthidea cinerea Gould, 1837

= Apostlebird =

Species of bird

The apostlebird (Struthidea cinerea), also known as the grey jumper, lousy jack or happy family, is a quick-moving, gray or black bird about 33 cm (13 in) long. It is a native to Australia where it roams woodlands, eating insects and seeds at, or near, ground level. Apostlebirds often travel in groups of about 12; for this reason, they were named after the 12 Biblical apostles.

== Taxonomy ==
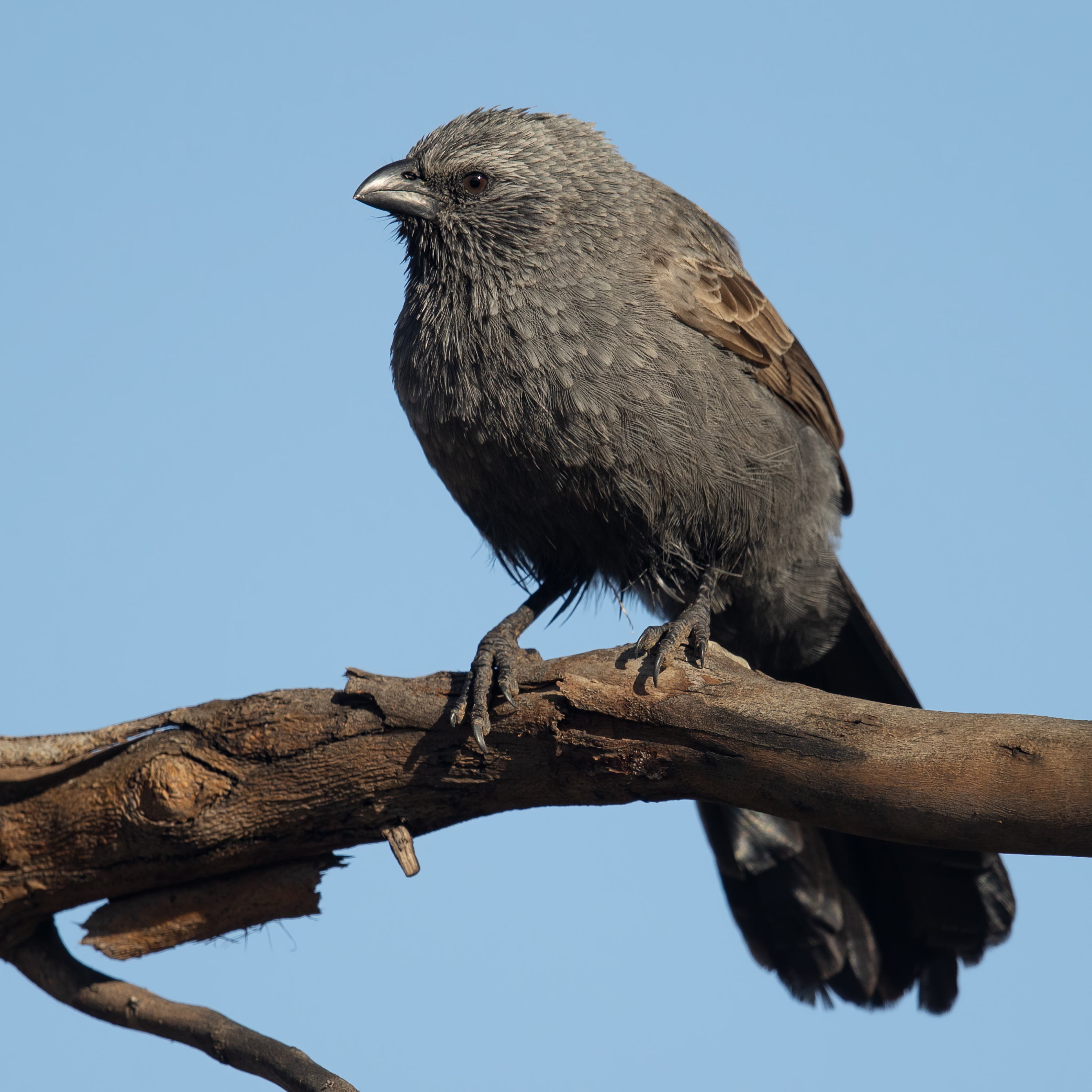

Originally described by ornithologist John Gould in 1837, its specific epithet is Latin cinerea "grey". In its own genus Struthidea, it is placed in the family known as the mud-nest builders or Corcoracidae, written as Grallinidae in older books before the removal of the genus Grallina to the monarch family. It is one of two remaining species, with the white-winged chough (Corcorax melanorhamphos), which differs in appearance but exhibits many behavioural similarities. The mudnest builder family Corcoracidae itself is now placed in a narrower "core corvine" group, which contains the crows and ravens, shrikes, birds of paradise, fantails, monarch flycatchers, and drongos.

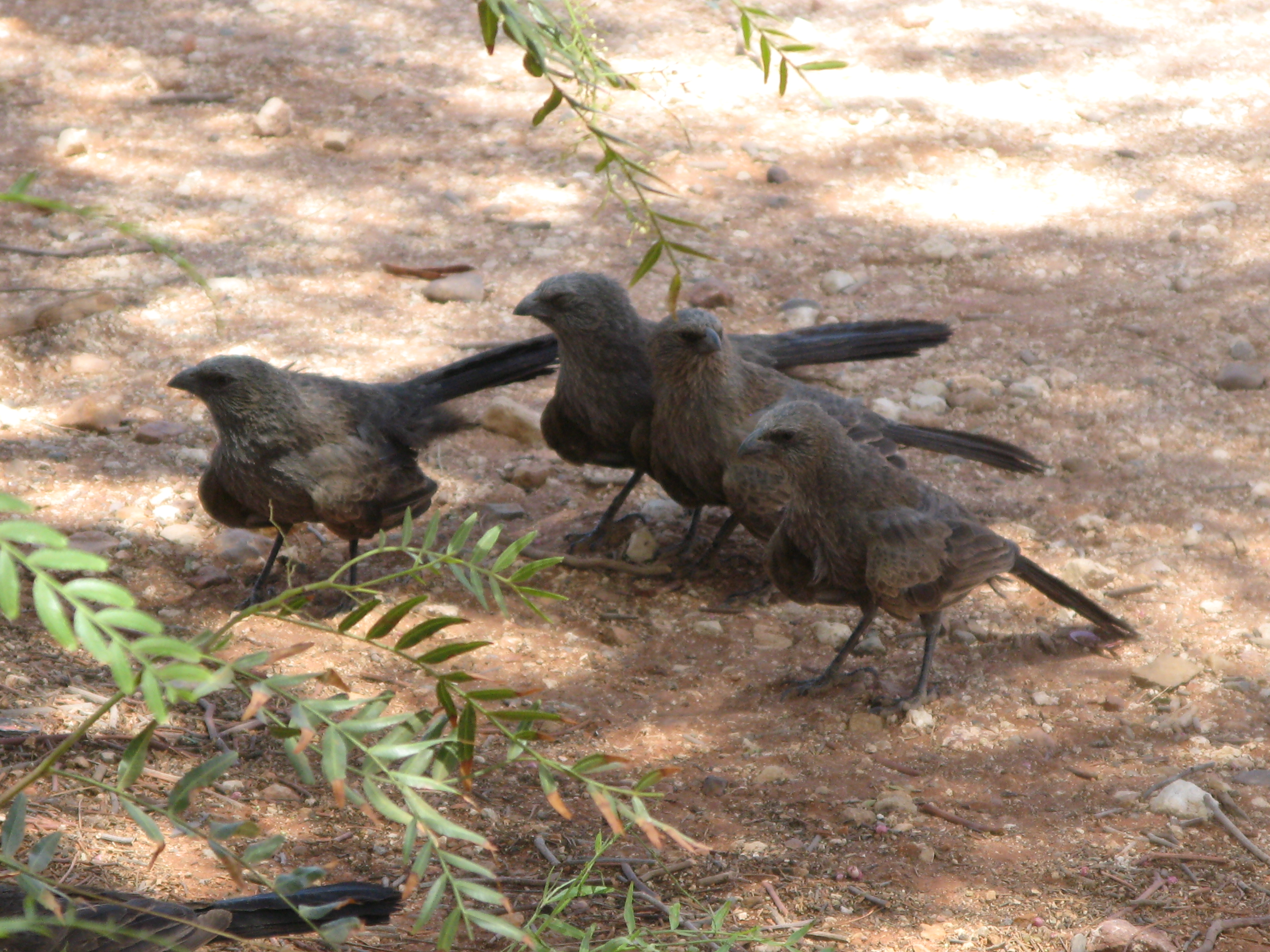

The apostlebird was named after the Biblical apostles, the twelve followers of Jesus Christ. In fact, the species travel in family groups of between 6 and 20, which may coalesce with other family groups into large feeding flocks of over 40. Their gregarious nature, and harsh scolding/grating calls have led to a plethora of colloquial names. They can be known locally as lousy jacks (due to heavy louse infestations), happy jacks, and happy families. Grey jumper is an alternate name.

== Description ==
Measuring around 33 cm (13 in) in length, the apostlebird is a predominantly dark grey bird with a long black tail tinted greenish in sunlight. The grey feathers on the head, neck and breast are brushed with paler grey-white and the wings are brownish. The legs and bill are black and the eyes brown or white.

== Distribution and habitat ==
The natural range is across inland eastern Australia, from the mallee regions of northern Victoria and eastern South Australia, north through New South Wales and central-western Queensland to the Gulf Country. There is an isolated population in the Northern Territory. Dry open woodland is the preferred habitat, especially Callitris in New South Wales and Casuarina in Queensland, and Lancewood-Bulwaddi communities in the Northern Territory.

== Breeding ==
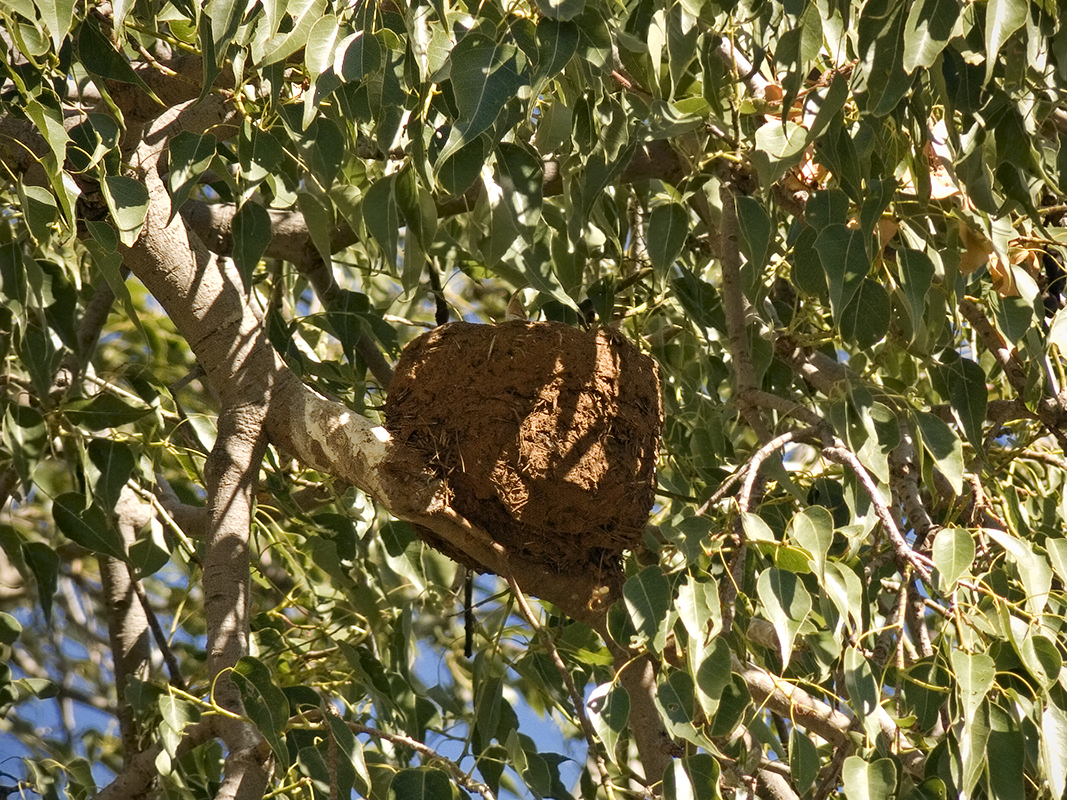
Mud nest high in a fig tree

Apostlebirds are a socially living, cooperative breeding species with each breeding group generally containing only one breeding pair, the rest being either their helper offspring, kin or unrelated adult birds. Most group members help construct a mud nest, share in incubation of the eggs, and defense of the nest. Once the eggs are hatched, all members of the group help feed the chicks and keep the nest clean.

Apostlebirds are a fission-fusion society. In winter, birds flock in larger groups, and as breeding season approaches winter groups break into smaller breeding groups. This change in group size is a consequence of breeding groups merging in the winter and breaking apart again in the summer breeding season. Breeding groups use small, non overlapping home ranges around the nest site, while winter ranges are larger with groups freely interacting with other groups.

Breeding season is from August to December. The nest is a deep cup-shaped structure made of grasses held together with mud or sometimes manure in a tree fork up to seven or eight metres above the ground. Three to five pale blue-white eggs sparsely splotched with brown and lavender shades are laid measuring 22 mm x 29 mm. They are tapered oval in shape.

== Conservation status ==
Apostlebirds are not listed as threatened on the Australian Environment Protection and Biodiversity Conservation Act 1999. However, their conservation status varies from state to state within Australia. For example:

- The apostlebird is listed as threatened on the Victorian Flora and Fauna Guarantee Act (1988). Under this Act, an Action Statement for the recovery and future management of this species has not yet been prepared.
- On the 2007 advisory list of threatened vertebrate fauna in Victoria, the apostlebird is not listed as a threatened species.
