= Helpers at the nest =

Term in evolutionary biology and behavioural ecology

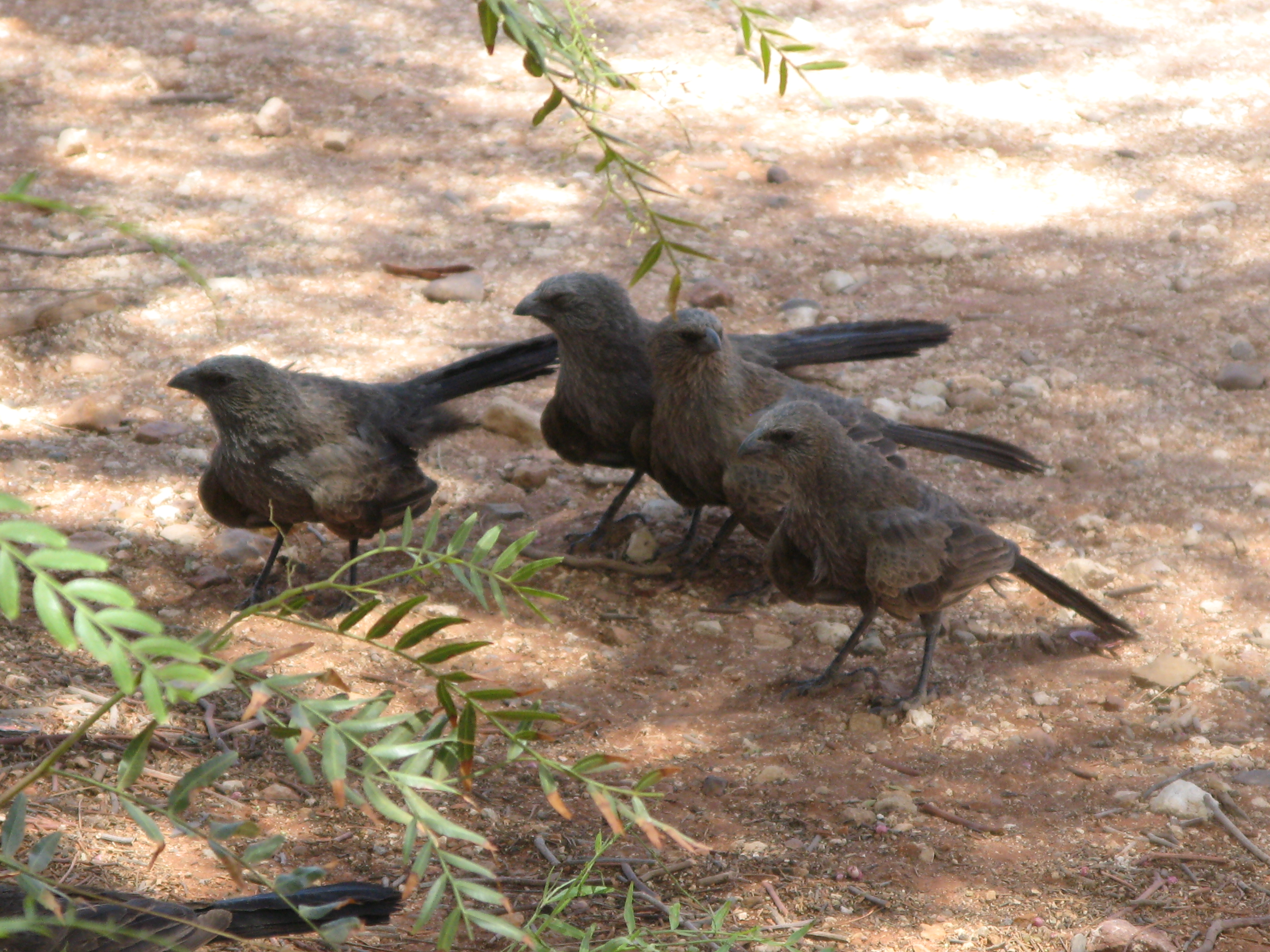
Four apostlebirds (Struthidea cinerea) of a cooperative breeding group.

Helpers at the nest is a term used in behavioural ecology and evolutionary biology to describe a social structure in which juveniles and sexually mature adolescents of either one or both sexes remain in association with their parents and help them raise subsequent broods or litters, instead of dispersing and beginning to reproduce themselves. This phenomenon was first studied in birds where it occurs most frequently, but it is also known in animals from many different groups including mammals and insects. It is a simple form of co-operative breeding. The effects of helpers usually amount to a net benefit, however, benefits are not uniformly distributed by all helpers nor across all species that exhibit this behaviour. There are multiple proposed explanations for the behaviour, but its variability and broad taxonomic occurrences result in simultaneously plausible theories.

The term "helper" was coined by Alexander Skutch in 1935 and defined more carefully in 1961 in the avian context as "a bird which assists in the nesting of an individual other than its mate, or feeds or otherwise attends a bird of whatever age which is neither its mate nor its dependent offspring." The term has been criticised as being anthropomorphic, but it remains in use. Other terms used especially in mammals, depending on the specific contexts, are non-maternal (care by other than the mother), alloparental (care by other than the parents), cooperative (care by non-breeding helpers) and communal (care by other breeding females) care.

== Examples ==
It occurs in between three and eight percent of bird species worldwide (estimates vary), but is much more common in Australia and Southern Africa. Bird species in which this behaviour is found include the common moorhen, the house sparrow, the acorn woodpecker, and the apostlebird. Humans, damarland mole rats and meerkats are examples of mammals that exhibit this behaviour. It is also seen in a number of species of bee such as carpenter bees (note this is distinct from the behaviour of the European honey bee, where the worker bees are sterile and incapable of reproducing).

== Evolution ==
Three explanations for the occurrence of helpers at the nest have been put forward; they are not mutually exclusive, and in any particular species an investigation of the exact benefits and costs will be needed to see what combination of these factors may have driven the evolution of helping.

- Advantage to the helpers, who may be protected from predation, or gain skills that they will need when they subsequently reproduce, as a result of staying in the parental nest.
- Kin selection: since subsequent litters or broods from the same parents will be full siblings to the helpers, they are as closely related genetically as their own offspring would be. Helping their parents is therefore as productive for the juveniles as reproducing themselves would be, and if their parents are better able to reproduce, the balance of advantage may be greater.
- Delayed advantage to the helpers, in particular because they stand to inherit their parents' territory; this explanation is particularly compelling if suitable territories are in short supply, but requires specific quantitative conditions to be met, favouring a stable queue of potential heirs.

== Misconceptions ==
Although it is frequently assumed that helpers are non-breeders, molecular evidence suggests that this may happen, and the term "secondary helper" is sometimes used in this case to indicate helpers that mate with or are offspring of the pair being assisted. The term "primary helper" being used for the commonest case of the helper being offspring of the pair and not involved in mating. Extrapair mates are chosen by the females and these then contribute to the care of the young who may be sired by them.

Juveniles living in association with their parents cannot automatically be regarded as helpers. In a number of species, such as the logrunners and the Siberian jay, young remain in the parental territory, but never help feed nestlings. However the delayed advantage explanation for the juveniles' association with their parents can still work in the absence of effective helping, whereas the kin selection explanation cannot.

== Associated effects ==
=== Reproductive success ===
Effects on reproductive success can be but are not always positive, and the strength of that positive correlation varies by species. Sometimes, the energy benefits to breeders, instead of being invested in improving reproductive performance, are used to offset reductions in reproductive performance. However, in many species, nestling survival rates are increased by helper investments. Further reproductive success benefits include better quality offspring, and nestling immune response.

=== Parental investment ===
Helpers at the nest can provide advantageous plasticity in the amount of investment parents need to give to their eggs and chicks. The presence of helpers can be associated with lower investments as the helpers can be depended on to provide certain elements of care and raising. For example, in the superb fairy-wren, nests with helpers present exhibit different average egg sizes than those without helpers. This plasticity can be seen in reference to change in climate conditions. In unfavourable conditions there is a need for female parents to maintain high egg investment, but in favourable conditions, egg investment by mothers declines as helpers can assist with some of the care-load. Superb fairy-wrens with helpers at the nest see average egg sizes increase in dry and hot conditions and decrease in colder conditions compared to nests without helpers.

== Helper variability ==
Generally, helpers provide a net benefit to parents raising offspring, but this benefit is not necessarily distributed uniformly. There can be an uneven distribution of benefits between species, or even between sexes within a species. Benefits provided by one sex may more heavily fluctuate according to various factors such as food availability. In acorn woodpeckers, while helpers of both sexes provide relatively the same benefit to reproductive success, male helper behaviour fluctuates. This fluctuation is dependent upon the size of recent acorn crops. Large acorn crops translate to increased behavioural effects from male helpers such as higher rates of granary tending and time spent in the home territory.

== Benefits and consequences for helpers ==
Helpers often also benefit from joining a breeding couple. After unsuccessfully breeding, juveniles may join breeding couples to become helpers. By opting to become helpers while still juveniles and having poor breeding prospects, helpers can benefit from increased survival rates. A trade-off of this increased survival over non-helper juveniles is that their successful breeding rate after becoming helpers decreases compared to non-helpers.

== See also ==
- Alloparenting
- Altruistic behaviour
- Ethology
