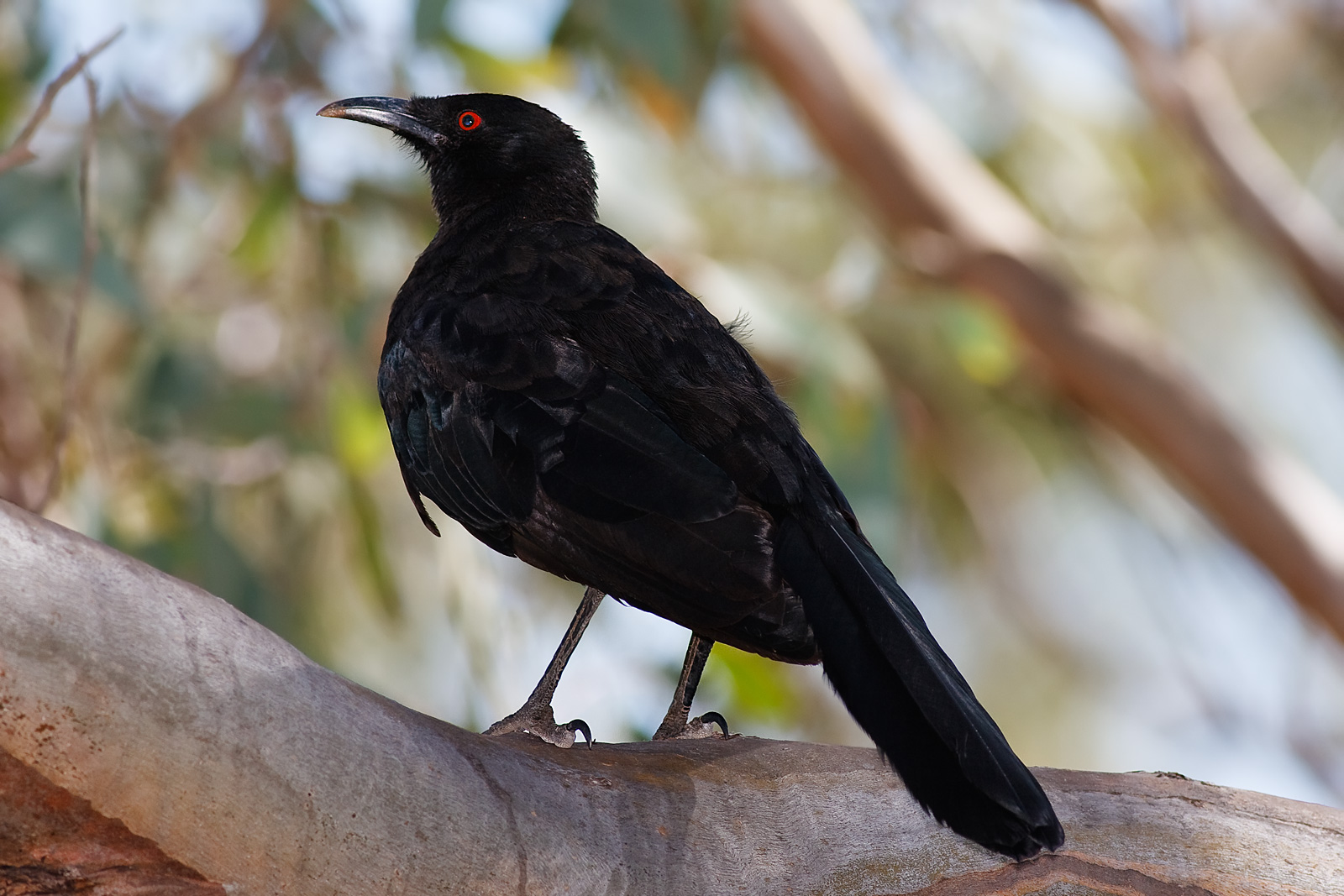
- White-winged chough (Corcorax melanorhamphos)

Scientific classification
- Kingdom: Animalia
- Phylum: Chordata
- Class: Aves
- Order: Passeriformes
- Superfamily: Corvoidea
- Family: Corcoracidae; Mathews 1927

Species
- Corcorax melanorhamphos; Struthidea cinerea

Synonyms
- Struthideidae Mathews 1924

= Australian mudnester =

Australian mudnesters

Family of birds

Corcoracidae is a family of passerine birds known as the Australian mudnesters. The family has sometimes been called Struthideidae in the past; however, despite Struthideidae being an older name than Corcoracidae, the latter name takes precedence. It contains just two species in two genera, the white-winged chough (Corcorax melanorhamphos) and the apostlebird (Struthidea cinerea). Both are endemic to Australia.

== Distribution and habitat ==
Both the Australian mudnesters are found in open habitat in eastern Australia, mostly open eucalypt woodlands and some forest that lacks a closed canopy. The apostlebird is more tolerant of arid habitats and is found in arid woodland and shrublands. Both species are tolerant of human modified habitats and will occupy farmlands and suburban areas, and even parks and gardens.

== Description ==
The two mudnesters are medium-sized passerines, the apostlebird being smaller at around 31 centimetres (12 in) in length and the larger white-winged chough averaging 47 centimetres (19 in). Their morphology is typical of ground feeding passerines, with long legs and short, rounded wings. The most noticeable differences between the two species are in the plumage (grey with brown wings and a black tail in the apostlebird, and black with white wing patches in the white-winged chough) and bill shape. The bill of the apostlebird is short and deep, not unlike that of a finch, whereas the bill of the white-winged chough is long and curved, not unlike that of its Old World namesakes, the choughs. The differences in the bills reflect the differences in feeding ecology, with the apostlebirds using theirs for sparrow-like picking whereas the white-winged chough uses its bill to flick leaf litter around.

== Behaviour ==
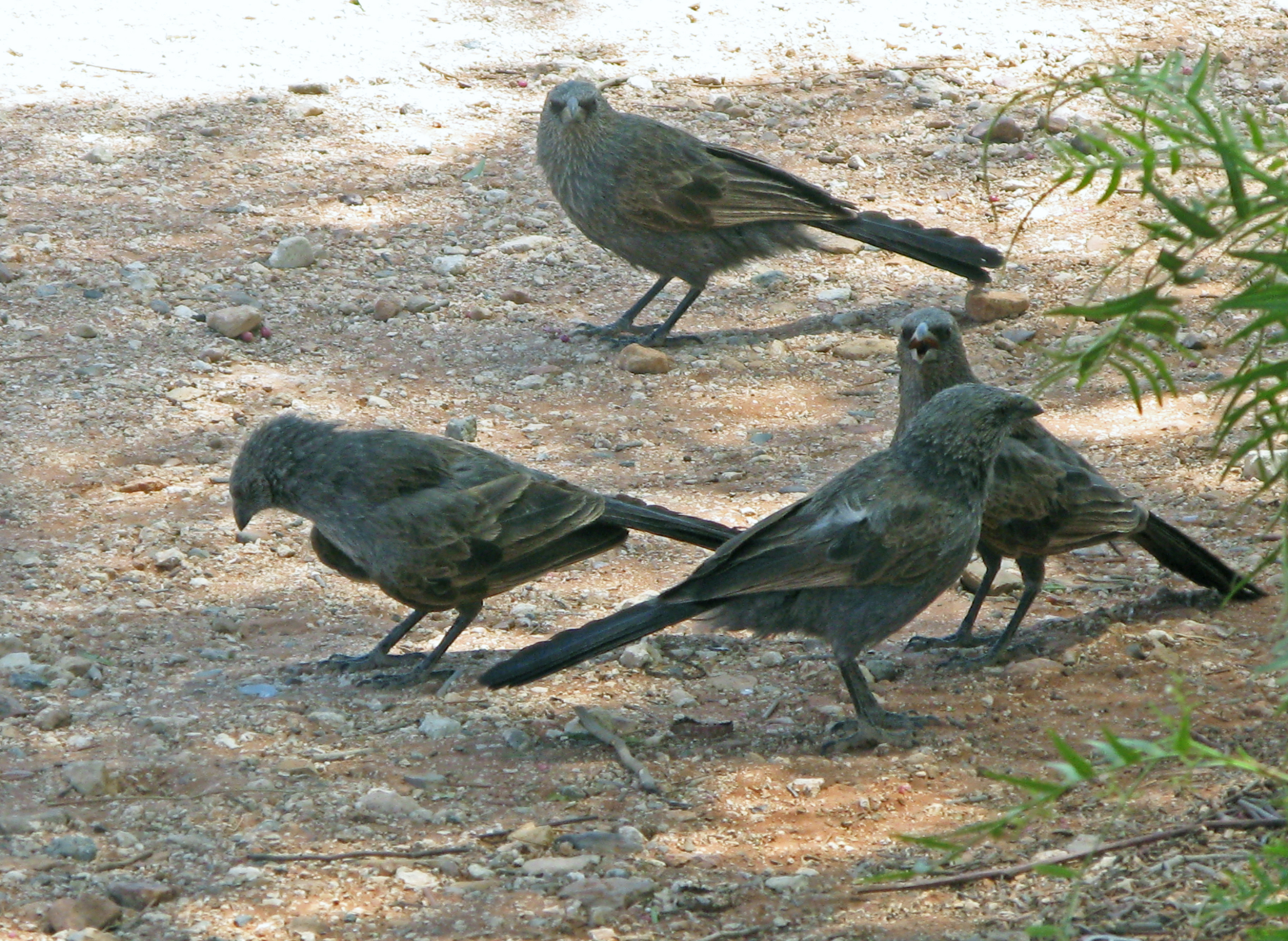
Apostlebirds. Both species in this family are highly social and live in groups of as many as 20 birds.

In the field, the relationship between the two species is immediately apparent: both species are highly social, spending much of their time foraging through leaf litter with a very distinctive gait, calling to one another almost constantly. Both species respond to a human interloper by flying heavily to a nearby tree, where they wait for the disturbance to pass, often perching close together in twos and threes and allopreening. In picnic grounds and parks these birds may become accustomed to humans and become very tame.

The social groups of mudnesters are based around a dominant male and female. The number of birds in the group may vary from two to twenty birds, six birds being typical in the white-winged chough and seven to nine birds in the apostlebird. Both species are non migratory and defend a territory during the breeding season. The size of the territory during the breeding season is around 20 ha, after the breeding season when the chicks are fledged the group may range over a larger territory. On the death of one of the dominant breeders the groups break up, and the remaining dominant bird will take immatures from their group and find a lone bird to form a new group. The majority of recruits into any group after its establishment are youngsters from previous breeding seasons. These helpers are important in breeding success, so much so that white-winged choughs have been reported to kidnap nearly fledged chicks from other groups in order to increase the size of the kidnapping group.

As the common name of the family suggests, the nests are constructed out of mud. These bowl shaped nests take several days to construct, longer if supplies of mud dry up before the nest is finished. Nests are built opportunistically when rain causes muddy puddles, and may be reused if possible. Around three to five oval eggs are laid in each clutch. These eggs are incubated for around twenty days by all members of the group, and feeding and brooding duties are also shared within the group. This family has a very long period of fledgling care, with full independence from the parents and helpers taking up to 200 days.

== Species ==
- White-winged chough, Corcorax melanorhamphos
- Apostlebird, Struthidea cinerea
