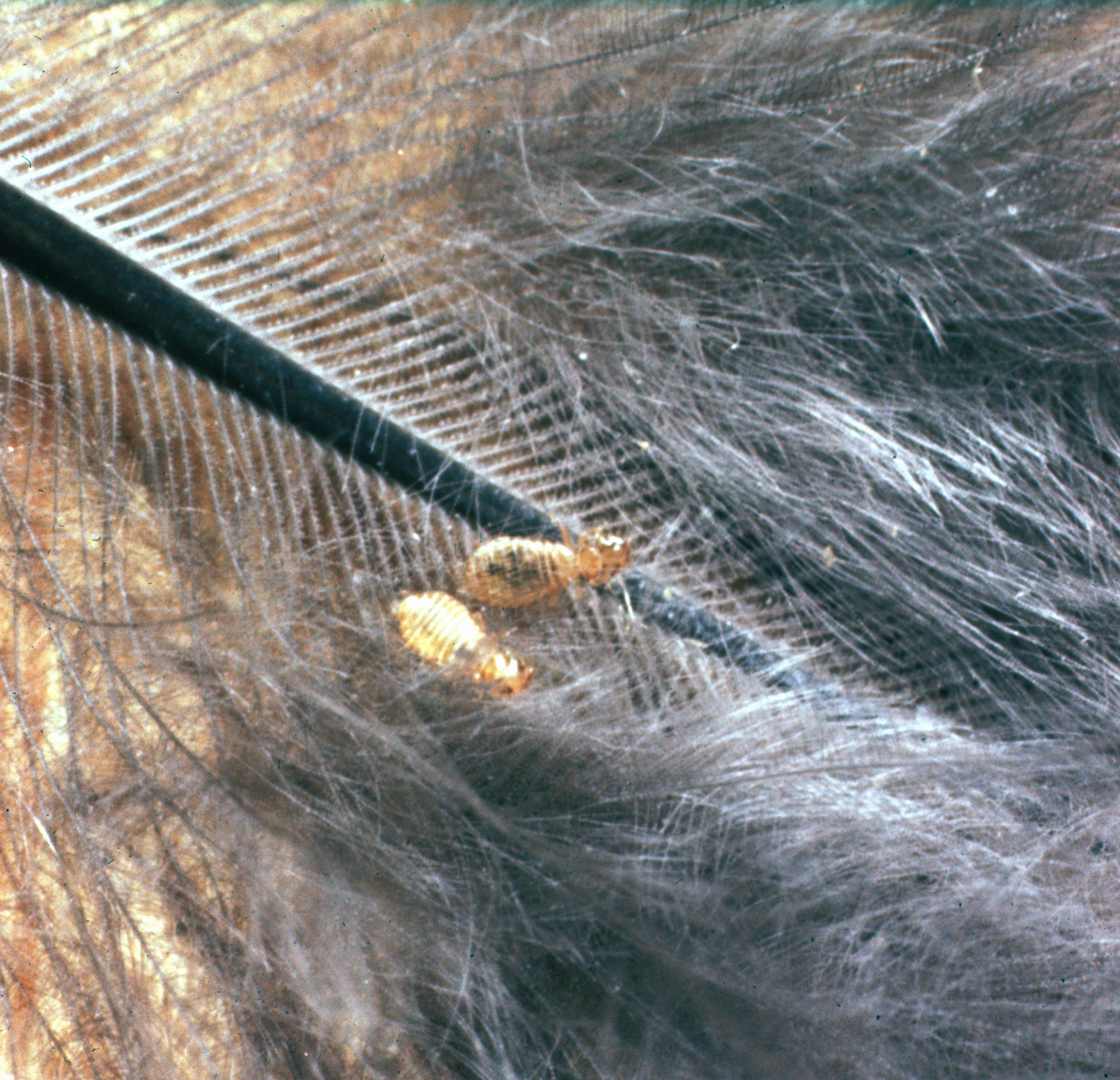
- Menacanthus stramineus nymphs on a chicken feather

Scientific classification
- Domain: Eukaryota
- Kingdom: Animalia
- Phylum: Arthropoda
- Class: Insecta
- Order: Psocodea
- Infraorder: Phthiraptera
- Family: Menoponidae
- Genus: Menacanthus; Neumann, 1912

= Menacanthus =

Genus of lice

Menacanthus is a genus of chewing lice which parasitise birds. The taxonomy of this genus is highly uncertain. Most taxonomies have given this genus as having over a hundred species, but recent studies have synonymised dozens of species and found other names to be invalid. Some Menacanthus species remain to be discovered, or are synonymised in error. Menacanthus lice feed on the blood of a wide variety of birds, including chickens, by piercing the quills of feathers and gnawing the epidermis. In doing so, they can spread disease and lower egg production. In Menacanthus stramineus, eggs are incubated for four or five days, each of the three nymphal stages lasts for about three days, and adult life for about twelve days. Females produce as many as four eggs in a day, averaging 1.6 eggs a day, with egg production peaking 5–6 days after reaching adulthood. On sparrows, Menacanthus lice are particularly common, and are found in many different niches, consuming blood and feathers.
