= Chuff =

Chuff may refer to:

== Biology ==
- Chough, sometimes spelled as "chuff", various crow species:
  - Alpine chough or yellow-billed chough (Pyrrhocorax graculus)
  - Red-billed chough (Pyrrhocorax pyrrhocorax)
  - White-winged chough (Corcorax melanorhamphos)

== Sounds ==
- Prusten or chuffing, a vocalization made by tigers and snow leopards
- A regular, sharp puffing sounds, as in a steam locomotive

== Other uses ==
- Palleus Chuff, an actor and Yoda impersonator in Sean Stewart's 2004 novel Yoda: Dark Rendezvous

== See also ==
- Chough (disambiguation)
