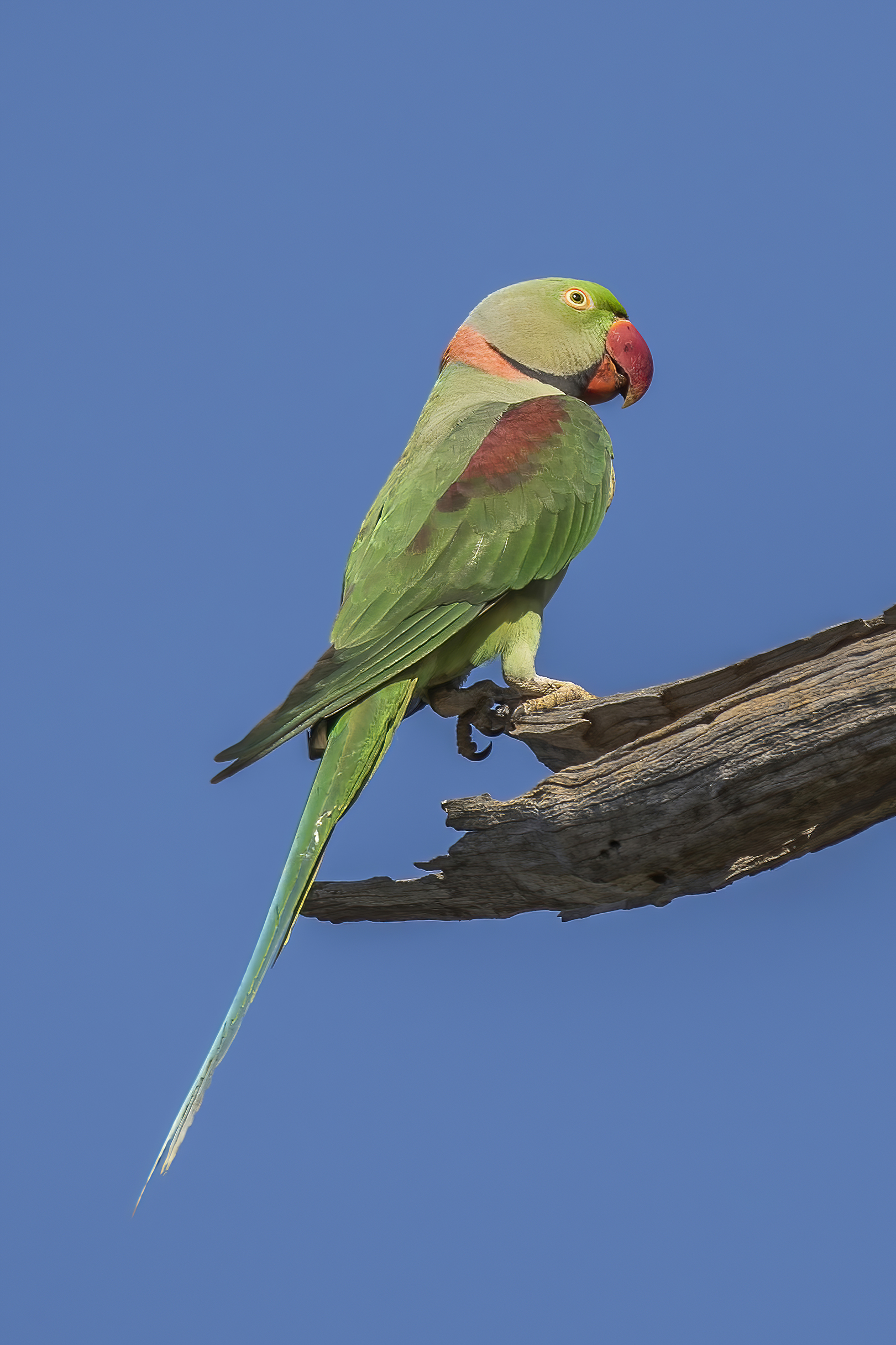
- Male P. e. eupatria Sri Lanka
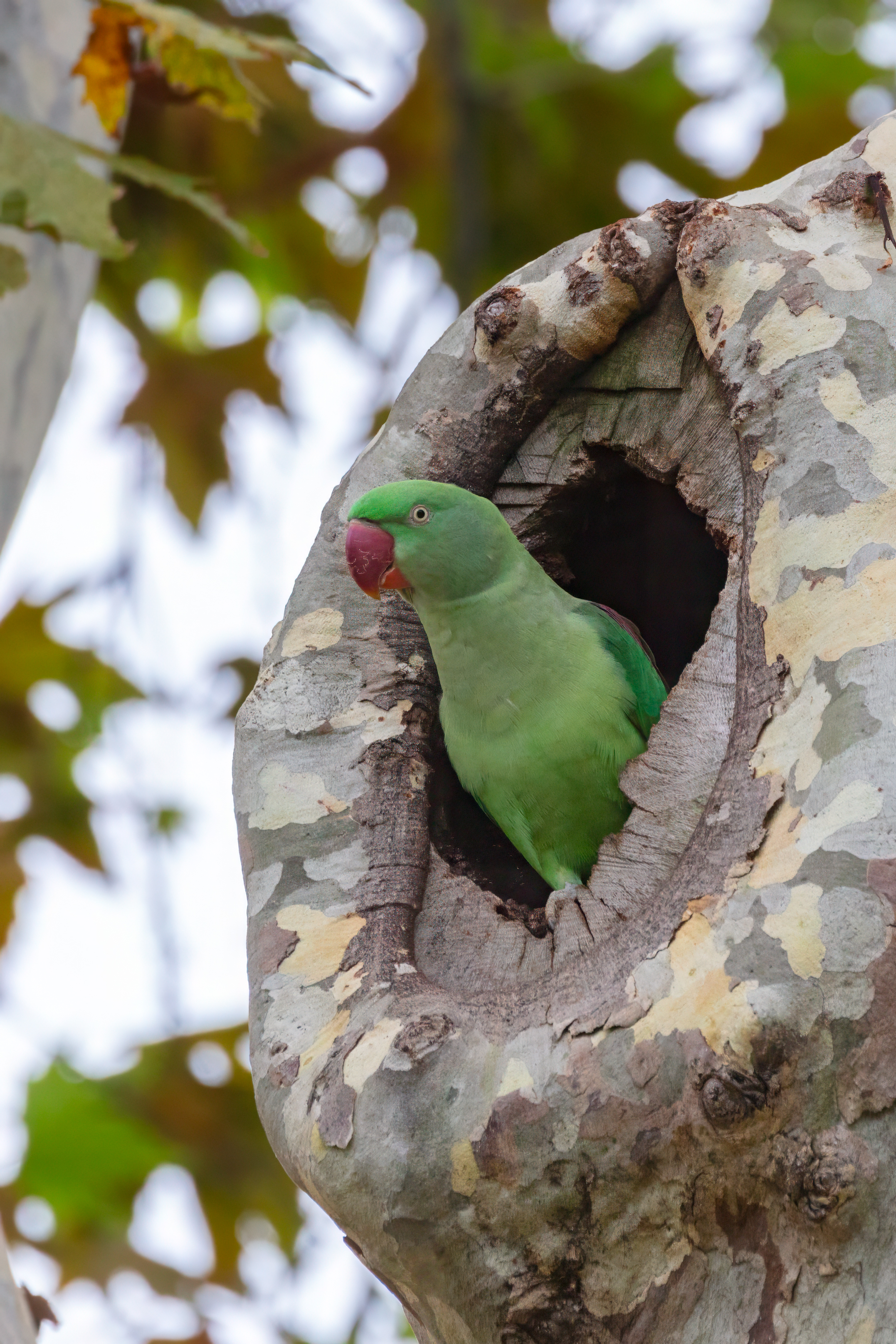
- Female; Istanbul, Turkey

Conservation status
- Least Concern (IUCN 3.1)
- CITES Appendix II

Scientific classification
- Kingdom: Animalia
- Phylum: Chordata
- Class: Aves
- Order: Psittaciformes
- Family: Psittaculidae
- Genus: Psittacula
- Species: P. eupatria

Binomial name
- Psittacula eupatria (Linnaeus, 1766)
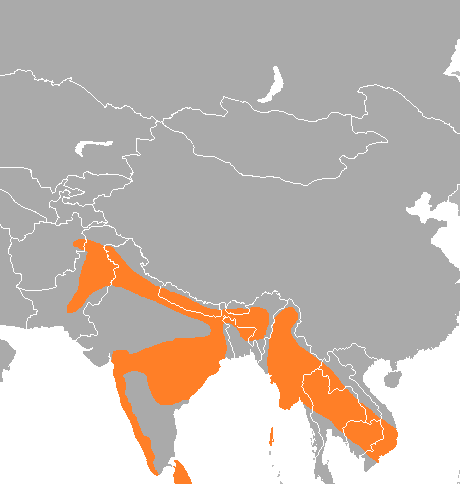
- Native range of Psittacula eupatria

Synonyms
- Psittacus eupatria Linnaeus 1766; Palaeornis eupatria (Linnaeus, 1766)

= Alexandrine parakeet =

Species of bird

The Alexandrine parakeet (Psittacula eupatria), also known as the Alexandrine parrot, is a medium-sized parrot in the genus Psittacula of the family Psittaculidae, native to South Asia and Southeast Asia. It is named after Alexander the Great, who transported numerous birds from Punjab to various European and Mediterranean countries and regions, where they were prized by the royalty, nobility and warlords.

The Alexandrine parakeet has established feral populations in Turkey, Iraq, Kuwait, Saudi Arabia, Bahrain, Qatar, the United Arab Emirates, Iran, Pakistan, Germany, The Netherlands and Belgium where it lives alongside feral populations of its close relative, the rose-ringed parakeet (Psittacula krameri).

== Taxonomy and etymology ==
The Alexandrine parakeet was first described by French zoologist Mathurin Jacques Brisson as Psittaca Ginginiana or "La Perruche de Gingi" (The Gingi's Parakeet) in 1760; after the town of Gingee in southeastern India, which was a French outpost then. The birds may, however, merely have been held in captivity there. Carl Linnaeus redescribed the Alexandrine parakeet in 1766 as Psittacus eupatria.

The genus name Psittacula is a diminutive of the Latin word psittacus meaning "parrot", and the specific name eupatria (εὖπατριά) is derived from the ancient Greek eu- meaning "well" and patriá meaning "descent".

In 2019, a genetic study revived the genus Palaeornis, formerly viewed as a synonym of the current genus Psittacula. Some organisations – including the IUCN – have accepted the new taxonomy. If this were to be taken into account, this could mean that the Alexandrine parakeet is the only living member of the now-revived genus.

== Phylogeny ==
Genetic analysis of the mitochondrial cytochrome b sequences of Psittacula parakeets has shown that the Alexandrine parakeet diverged from the lineage that gave rise to the rose-ringed parakeet (Psittacula krameri) and the Mauritius parakeet (Psittacula eques) about 5 million years ago.

== Description ==
The Alexandrine parakeet is one of the largest parakeets, measuring 56 to 62 cm (22 to 24 in) from the top of the head to the tip of the tail and weighing 200 to 300 g (7.1 to 10.6 oz). The tail measures 28 to 35 cm (11 to 14 in). It is predominantly green with a light blue-grey sheen on the cheeks and nape (back of the neck), yellow-green abdomen, red patch on the shoulders and massive red beak with yellow tips. The upper-side of the tail passes from green at the top to blue further down, and is yellow at the tip. The underside of the tail is yellow.

Adults are sexually dimorphic. Adult males have a black stripe across their lower cheeks and a pink band on their nape. Adult females lack both a black cheek stripe and a pink nape band. The young are similar in appearance to adult females but have shorter tails.

== Subspecies ==
Five subspecies of the Alexandrine parakeet are currently recognized

Subspecies	Distribution	Notes
Alexandrine parakeet (P. e. eupatria) [main type-group]	Western India, South India and Sri Lanka.	'Nominate' subspecies: Main type-(sub)species for the whole group.
Large Indian parakeet (P. e. nipalensis)	Eastern Afghanistan, Pakistan, North India, Central India, East India, Nepal, and Bhutan.	It is larger than the nominate subspecies, and more greyish-green. The back of the head and cheeks are tinged blue. Adult males have a broader black stripe across the lower cheek.
Large Burmese parakeet (P. e. avensis)	Northeast India, Bangladesh, and Myanmar.	It has a smaller beak than the nominate subspecies. Males look like P. e. nipalensis, however the neck and underparts are more yellowish and there is a narrow blue stripe on the hindneck.
Large Andaman parakeet (P. e. magnirostris)	Andaman Islands and Coco Islands.	It is slightly larger than the nominate subspecies, and has a larger beak and brighter shoulder patch. Males have a narrow blue stripe above the nape band.
Thai rose-ringed parakeet (P. e. siamensis)	Vietnam, Cambodia, Laos, and Thailand.	It is smaller than the nominate subspecies and has a paler shoulder patch. It also has a yellowish face and neck. Males look like P. e. avensis, however the back of the head and nape are tinged blue.

== Ecology and behaviour ==
The Alexandrine parakeet lives in forests, woodlands, agricultural lands and mangrove forests at elevations of up to 900 m (3,000 ft). It eats a variety of wild and cultivated seeds, buds, fruits and nuts. Flocks can cause extensive damage to ripening fruits and grain crops like maize and jowar. It usually lives in small flocks, but forms larger groups in areas where food is abundant or at communal roosts.

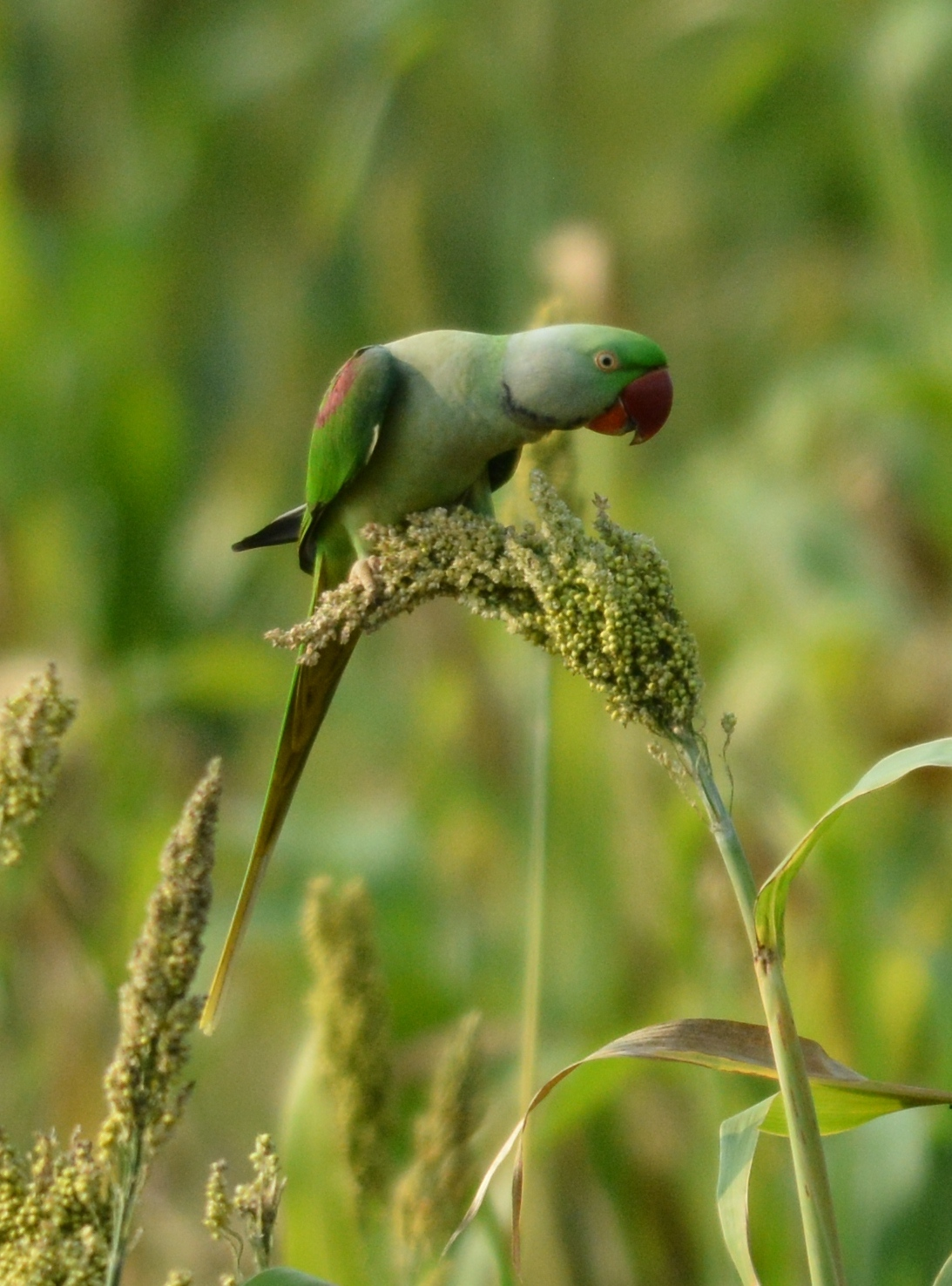
Female eating jowar

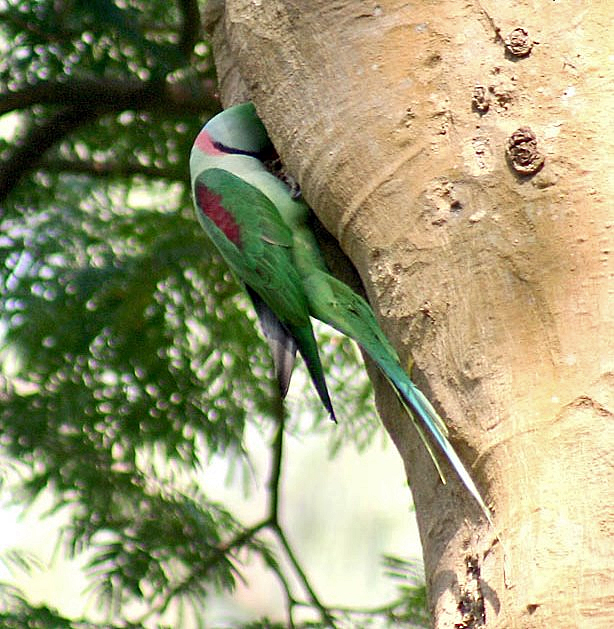
Male P. e. nipalensis attending to a nest in a tree hole in Kolkata, West Bengal, India

The Alexandrine parakeet has a variety of calls, including a ringing trrrieuw, loud kree-aar or keeak, deep klak-klak-klak-klak and resonant gr-aak. Its calls are usually deeper, harsher and more resonant than those of the rose-ringed parakeet. Its voice becomes harsher when alarmed, and it shrieks loudly when mobbing predators. Flocks occasionally excitedly vocalize together. It is known to imitate human speech in captivity.

=== Breeding ===
Alexandrine parakeets breed from November to April in their native range. They usually nest in tree hollows, but sometimes use tree holes excavated by themselves or cracks in buildings. Females lay 2 to 4 white, blunt oval-shaped eggs, measuring 27 to 34 mm (1.1 to 1.3 in). The average incubation period is 24 days. The chicks fledge at about 7 weeks of age, and are dependent on their parents until 3 to 4 months of age.

== Aviculture ==
Alexandrine parakeets are relatively popular pet birds due to their long lifespan in captivity (up to 40 years), playful behaviour and ability to mimic human speech. Alexander the Great is thought to have kept one as a pet. They are one of the most sought-after cage birds in the Indian market. According to CITES trade data, at least 57772 Alexandrine parakeets were imported into countries outside their native range between 1981 and 2014.

Color variants including lutino, albino, and blue are well-established in captivity.

The World Parrot Trust recommends that captive Alexandrine parrots be kept in a metal or welded mesh enclosure of minimum length 4.5 metres (15 ft).

== Conservation ==
The Alexandrine parakeet is listed as near threatened by the International Union for Conservation of Nature (IUCN) because of its steep population decline in its native range due to habitat loss, persecution and excessive capture to cater to the demands of the illegal wildlife trade. It is sporadic in South India, uncommon in Bangladesh, and declining in North Bengal and certain parts of Sri Lanka. It has suffered the greatest population declines in the Sindh and Punjab provinces of Pakistan, Laos, northwestern and southwestern Cambodia, and Thailand.

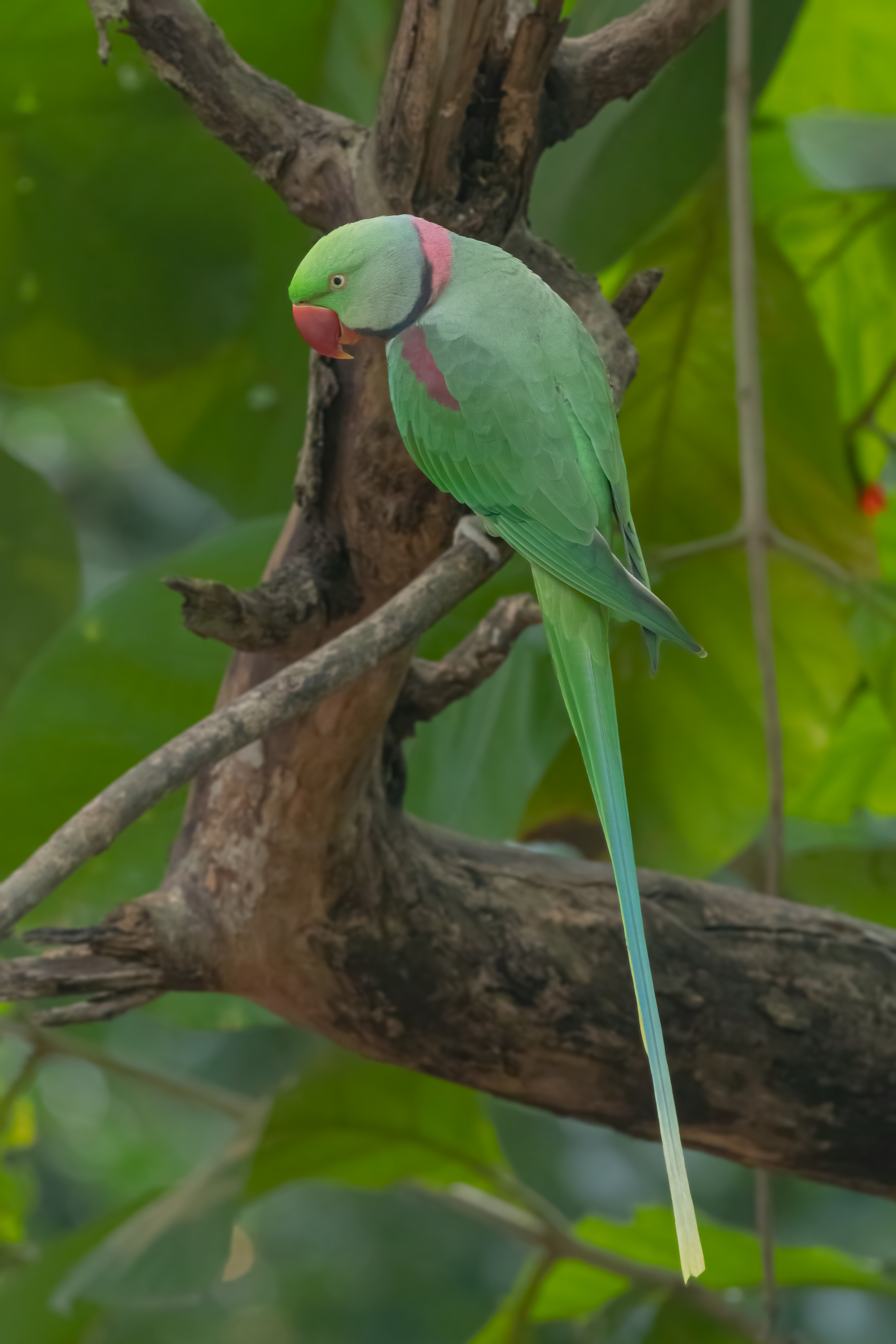
Alexandrine parakeet in Mysore

The sale of Alexandrine parakeets is not banned in Pakistan, and they can be found being openly sold in the markets of Lahore and Rawalpindi. Their sale is banned in India, and yet they are sold in broad daylight in urban bird markets, suggesting that the Indian government is allocating insufficient resources for their protection.

== Culture ==
Sri Lanka, Vietnam, Thailand, Mongolia and Iran have issued postage stamps depicting the Alexandrine parakeet.
