= Chough (disambiguation) =

The chough (/tʃʌf/ CHUF) is any of two species of birds that constitute the genus Pyrrhocorax:

- Alpine chough or yellow-billed chough (P. graculus)
- Red-billed chough (P. pyrrhocorax)

Chough may also refer to:

== Biology ==
- White-winged chough (Corcorax melanorhamphos)
- Ground jay or ground chough, a bird in the genus Podoces
- Rodrigues starling, termed the "bi-coloured chough"

== Other uses ==
- Chough (Korean surname), Korean surname, a variant spelling of Cho
- Migovec System, also called Chough Cave, an Alpine cave in Slovenia
- Operation Chough, conservationist project in Cornwall, England

== See also ==
- Chuff (disambiguation)
