= Carl G. Jones =

Welsh conservation biologist (born 1954)

Carl Gwynfe Jones MBE
- Born: 20 June 1954 (age 72); Carmarthen, Wales, United Kingdom
- Education: University of Wales, Swansea
- Known for: Restoration and conservation of Mauritius kestrel, pink pigeon, Mauritius parakeet, Mauritius olive white-eye, Rodrigues fody, Rodrigues flying fox.
- Spouse: Paula Senior
- Children: 2
- Awards: MBE (2004); Indianapolis Prize (2016)

Carl Gwynfe Jones, MBE (born 20 June 1954) is a Welsh conservation biologist, who has been employed by Durrell Wildlife Conservation Trust since 1985, and a founding member (1984) and current scientific director of Mauritian Wildlife Foundation (MWF). Additionally he is Chief Scientist at Durrell Wildlife Conservation Trust, and an honorary professor in ecology and conservation biology at the University of East Anglia. Often outspoken on the importance of knowing your species and using intuition, empathy and practical knowledge over dogmatic education, Jones is best known for his work in recovering the Mauritius kestrel (Falco punctatus) from just four individuals in 1974, to an estimated 400. Working in the Mascarene Islands since 1979, Jones has led five successful bird restoration projects where the starting population has numbered less than 12 individuals; as a consequence Mauritius has averted more bird extinctions than any other country. Jones has pioneered the use of ecological or taxon replacements to fill the ecological roles of extinct animals and successfully restored levels of endemic vegetation to previously denuded islets. Jones' work has been highlighted in Douglas Adams and Mark Carwardine's 1990 radio documentary Last Chance to See, along with its accompanying book, as well as David Quammen's 1996 book The Song of the Dodo: Island Biogeography in an Age of Extinctions.

== Early life ==
Jones was born in Carmarthen, Wales in 1954. During his youth he was fascinated with animals, and bred kestrels in his back yard. He credits both his initial excitement and subsequent success in restoring the Mauritius kestrel to the experience gathered during this time. Speaking of his decision to pursue conservation as a career, Jones has stated:

I have always known what I wanted to do for as long as I can remember. I wanted to work with wildlife, to visit remote areas and to contribute to the conservation of the most endangered species. But dreaming is not enough and I realised that I needed some higher qualifications.

Subsequently, he has spent his career conserving and studying species and systems and helping others to become conservation biologists.

== Education ==
Jones went to Queen Elizabeth I Grammar School for boys, Carmarthen. He did his BSc at the North East London Polytechnic. In 1978 Jones began his master's degree at University of Wales, Swansea. Initially studying developmental strategies in owls, the opportunity to run the conservation project in Mauritius saw him change the title of his research to "Studies on the Biology of the Critically Endangered Birds of Mauritius" From these studies he began to formulate a strategy to conserve the most endangered avifauna in his project region. After completing his MSc, he completed a PhD, also at Swansea, studying the pink pigeon (Nesoenas mayeri).

== Mauritius and Mascarene Islands ==
Jones started working in Mauritius in 1979, whilst working for the International Council for Bird Preservation (now known as Birdlife International). Upon arrival, Jones' focus was to run and establish the captive breeding project and to work on the conservation of the most threatened species in the wild. Carl worked on the pink pigeon and the Mauritius kestrel (Falco punctatus), which was considered the world's rarest bird. The species had reached an all-time low in 1974 with only four known wild birds. Despite the prevailing opinion that F. punctatus was doomed to extinction, he took over the recovery project that had been initiated in 1973 and began to implement captive breeding techniques such as "double-clutching", which is the removal of the first clutch of eggs (for captive rearing) which encourages the birds to lay a second clutch, thereby increasing the fecundity of breeding pairs, along with dietary supplementation for parents, fostering of captive reared young to wild pairs and hacking of captive raised birds to ensure maximum recruitment of juvenile birds. Between 1983 and 1993, 333 Mauritius kestrels were reared, a third of these were captive bred and the remainder were derived from wild harvested eggs, most of which were returned to the wild. The Mauritius kestrel has subsequently been down-listed from Critically Endangered in the late 1970s, to Endangered in 1994 and Vulnerable on the IUCN Red List by 2000.

During the 1970s, the Mauritius parakeet (Psittacula echo), the only surviving parrot species endemic to Mauritius and the Mascarenes, had suffered huge losses due to competing invasive species, predation from introduced mammals and loss of native trees in which to nest. By the early 1980s there were thought to be around 10 Mauritius parakeets left, with precious little recruitment throughout the decade. Whilst speaking at a 1990 captive breeding conference, Jones told delegates that the echo parakeet had a perilously low population and would likely become extinct, not for lack of expertise, but because attempts at gaining funding for the necessary actions had been fruitless. Mike Reynolds of the Parrot Trust approached Jones after the presentation, and the resultant collaboration brought much needed funds and veterinary expertise to the assistance of the species restoration project. Under Jones' guidance, nest boxes were placed in the forest, treatments to dissuade tropical nest flies from attacking the young in the nest and supplementary feeding for breeding pairs, and by 2005, 139 birds had been released. By 2015, there was a population of about 650 birds, and the species had been down-listed from Critically endangered to Endangered in 2007.

Further species restoration work was undertaken with the pink pigeon (Nesoenas mayeri), of which the population had declined to just 10 individuals by 1990. Population estimates of about 400 birds in seven subpopulations (six in the national park and one on Ile aux Aigrettes) in 2015 have resulted from Jones' leadership in the intervention, following similar methods to the Mauritius kestrel project.

Jones' work in Mauritius has always been in co-operation with the Government and he has had a close involvement with the development of their protected area network and the formation of their conservation department, the National Parks and Conservation Service. The Mauritian Wildlife Foundation and the National Parks and Conservation Service have grown in parallel and work jointly on several conservation initiatives including the running of Round Island and the species restoration projects.

== Restoration of island ecosystems ==
As well as the many successes with bird species and helping establish Mauritius' first National Park, Jones has been instrumental in restoring the animal and plant communities on islands around Mauritius and Rodrigues that had been left denuded and barren by decades of exposure to invasive non-native mammals, such as goats, rabbits, hares, cats and rats. Recognising that the native, endemic reptiles – some of which having already become extinct – were important ecological components, as well as evolutionarily distinct animals, Jones, the late Gerald Durrell, and John Hartley (who managed overseas projects for the Jersey Wildlife Preservation Trust), initiated an effort to rebuild entire eco-systems, beginning with removing alien invasive species from Round Island.

Work to restore nine highly degraded Mascarene off-shore islands is underway (in Mauritius: Round Island, Ile aux Aigrettes, Flat Island, Ile aux Gabrielle, Gunner's Quoin, Ile de la Passe and Ile Fouquet; in Rodrigues: Ile Cocos and Ile aux Sables). This has involved a major programme of invasive species eradication and control in partnership with the Mauritian government, including the removal of 11 exotic vertebrates and invertebrates from multiple islands.

The jewel in the crown of this programme is Round Island, one of the world's most important and long-standing island restoration projects. For over 30 years, work to remove invasive mammals and plants has been carried out, combined with the re-establishment of native plant species, regeneration of stands of hardwood trees and the introduction of an ecological replacement keystone species to restore lost ecological functions.

== Association with Durrell Wildlife Conservation Trust ==
A follower, since childhood, of the work of Gerald Durrell, he first visited the Jersey Zoo in 1967. When he went to Mauritius in 1979 he worked closely with the Jersey Wildlife Preservation Trust (now Durrell Wildlife Conservation Trust) and came into their employ in 1985, and continues to oversee the Trust's efforts in the Mascarenes. He is their Chief Scientist and a "thought leader" influencing many aspects of the Trust's work in both Jersey and elsewhere. He regularly lectures and teaches conservation theory, case studies and practical skills to students at Durrell Conservation Academy (formerly the International Training Centre), where his classes are prized for their humorous delivery and demonstrable field knowledge.

Jones has also taught students in Mauritius, Seychelles, St Lucia, Jersey, Galapagos, Guam, Fiji, Philippines and the United States.

== Awards and Indianapolis Prize nominations ==
In 1985, Carl was presented with the Ridder of the Golden Ark, by Prince Bernard of the Netherlands, in recognition of conservation achievements on Mauritius. He was nominated by Sir Peter Scott. In 1998, Jones was the first ever recipient of the Carolina Medal given by the World Parrot Trust for "outstanding achievement in parrot conservation" for the work on the Echo Parakeet. In the New Year's Honours list of 2004, he was made a Member of the Order of the British Empire for the conservation of endangered species on Mauritius.

Jones has been nominated for the Indianapolis Prize, in 2012, 2014 and again in 2016. His co-nominees for this prize, which celebrates true heroes in the field of conservation, include Russell Mittermeier of Conservation International and Joel Berger of the Wildlife Conservation Society. Jones was a finalist 2012, 2014 and in 2016. And in 2016 he won it indeed.
