= Stanley Temple =

American avian ecologist and wildlife biologist

Stanley A. "Stan" Temple is an American avian ecologist and wildlife biologist. He is the Beers-Bascom Professor in Conservation, Professor of Wildlife Ecology and Professor of Environmental Studies at the University of Wisconsin–Madison. He graduated from Cornell University in 1968 with a B.S. in biological sciences, 1970 with an M.S. in ecology, and 1972 with a Ph.D. in ecology and evolutionary biology. Temple has made important contributions to the study of peregrine falcons, whooping cranes, trumpeter swans, Andean condors, hook-billed kites, Mauritius kestrels, Seychelles kestrels, Puerto Rican amazons, Mauritius parakeets, tooth-billed pigeons, Hawaiian crows, loggerhead shrikes, and dickcissels. He has also worked on the responses of wildlife to habitat fragmentation, human impacts on wildlife populations and the ecology of avian predators. He is the author of many books and scholarly articles including Wisconsin Birds: A Seasonal and Geographical Guide (ISBN 0-299-15224-3), Endangered Birds (ISBN 0-85664-831-0), Bird Conservation (ISBN 0-299-08980-0) and Endangered birds: Management techniques for preserving threatened species (ISBN 0-299-07520-6).

In 1995 he was elected a fellow of the American Association for the Advancement of Science. In 2020 he was inducted into the Wisconsin Conservation Hall of Fame.
