= Paradise Park, Cornwall =

Paradise Park
- Interactive map of Paradise Park
- 50.17895°N 5.42617°W
- Date opened: 1973
- Location: Hayle, Cornwall, England
- No. of animals: 1000+
- Website: www.paradisepark.org.uk

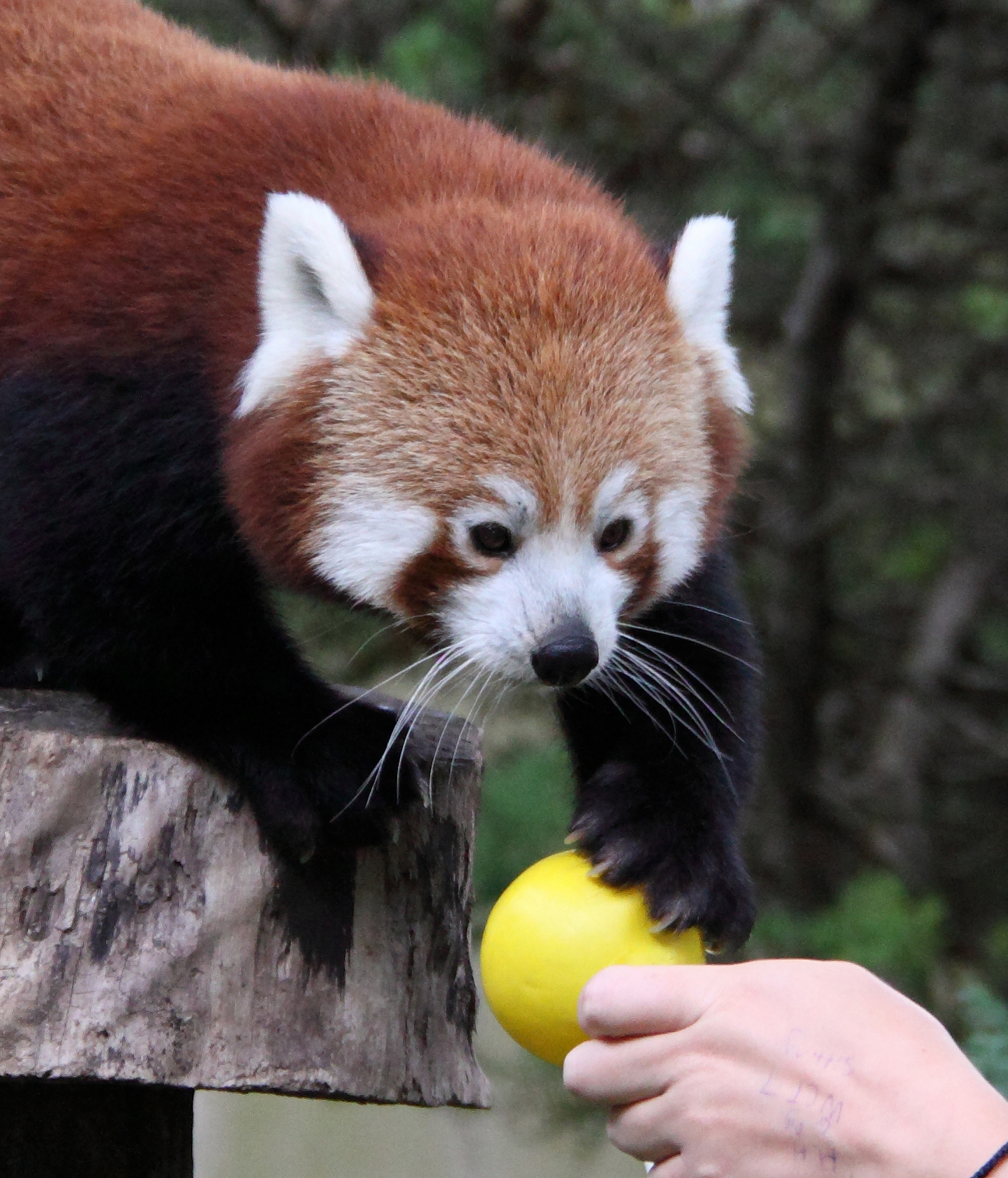
Red panda Lang Za during Training at Paradise Park

Paradise Park is a wildlife sanctuary situated in Hayle, Cornwall, England. It has over 1000 birds and animals and is the home of the World Parrot Trust.

== Events ==
Penguin feeding happens daily in the summer at Paradise Park. They have a summer event called the Eagles of Paradise Display, a free-flying bird show that includes several varieties of parrots.

On 21 March 2020 four zookeepers self-isolated on the property to care for their animals during the COVID-19 crisis.

== Conservation programmes ==
The park has red squirrels, which are part of a captive breeding program to reintroduce them to Cornwall, as well as red pandas, which are part of a conservation breeding programme. The park offers red panda experiences, which includes a donation to the Red Panda Network, helping to establish the world's first protected area dedicated to red pandas: the Panchthar-Ilam-Taplejung (PIT) Red Panda Protected Forest in eastern Nepal. The Park is also home to Operation Chough a conservation project established at Paradise Park 1987.

In 1989, Mike Reynolds set up the World Parrot Trust, a registered charity. This organisation works for conservation in the wild as well as at Paradise Park. So far the Trust has helped the survival of 80 species of parrot in 43 countries.

== Miniature railway ==
The site includes a circular 750-foot (230 m) long 15 in (381 mm) gauge railway, opened in 1976, which encircles the house at the centre of the park.
