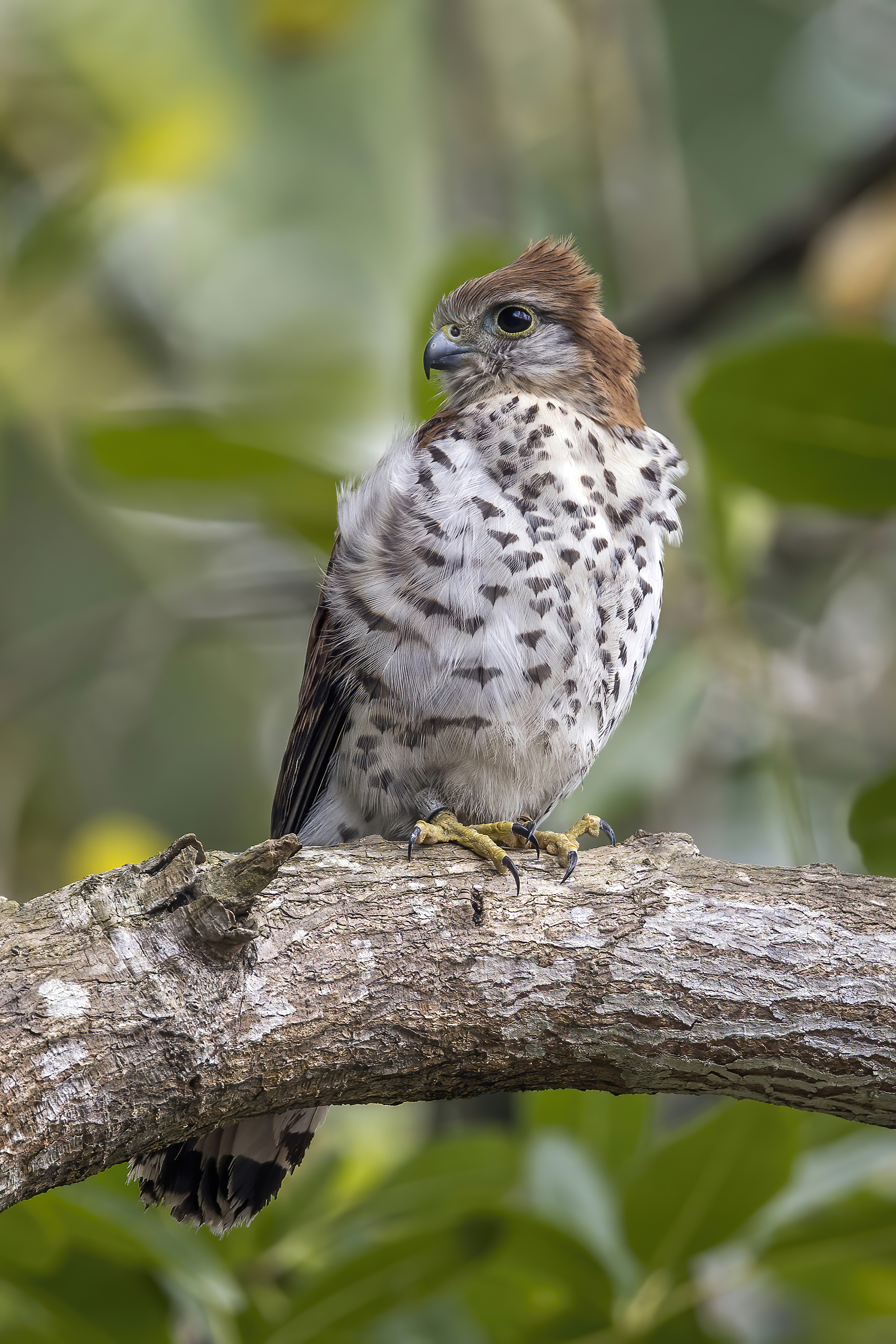
- Ebony Forest, Mauritius

Conservation status
- Endangered (IUCN 3.1)
- CITES Appendix I

Scientific classification
- Kingdom: Animalia
- Phylum: Chordata
- Class: Aves
- Order: Falconiformes
- Family: Falconidae
- Genus: Falco
- Species: F. punctatus

Binomial name
- Falco punctatus Temminck, 1821

= Mauritius kestrel =

Species of bird

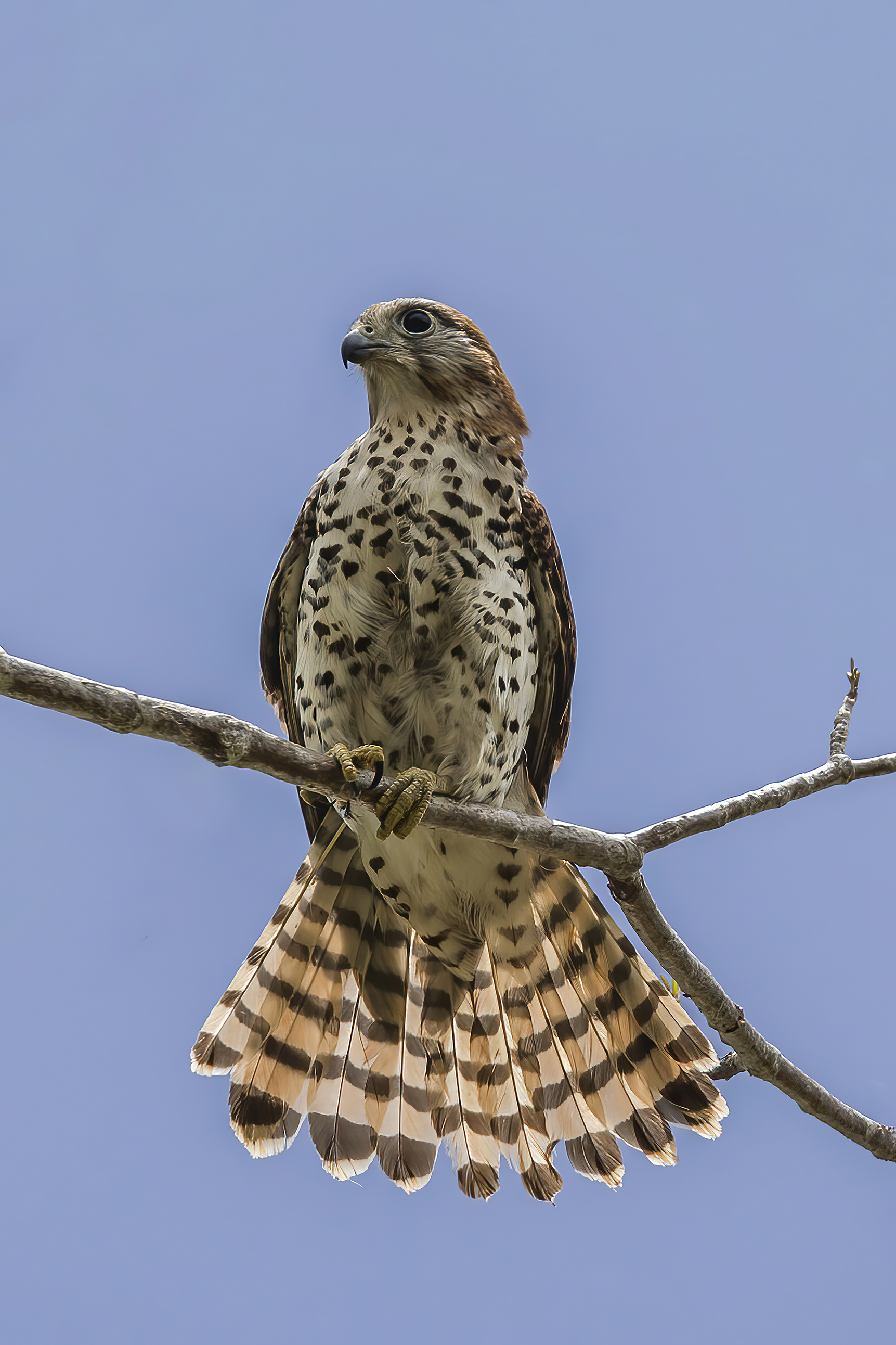
Showing tail feathers

The Mauritius kestrel (Falco punctatus) is a bird of prey from the family Falconidae endemic to the forests of Mauritius, where it is restricted to the southwestern plateau's forests, cliffs, and ravines. It is the most distinct of the Indian Ocean kestrels. It colonized its island home to evolve into a distinct species probably during the Gelasian (Late Pliocene). It is the most distant living species among the western Indian Ocean kestrels.

In 1974 the Mauritius kestrel was close to extinction, with only five or possibly six known birds, including two in captivity and a solitary breeding female. In 1985, numbers were estimated to have increased slightly in the wild, but it remained critically endangered at fewer than 15 individuals.

After considerable pioneering conservation efforts by Carl G. Jones and Abdool Wahab Owadally the numbers had increased to circa 400 birds in 2019. This conservation achievement is regarded as one of the most successful and best documented bird restoration projects in the world. It was proclaimed the national bird of Mauritius in March 2022 to mark the 30th anniversary of the Republic of Mauritius.

== Description ==
It can reach a size between 26 and 30.5 cm (10.2 and 12.0 in). It weighs up to 250 g (8.8 oz). Males are slightly smaller than the females. Wingspan is approximately 45 cm (18 in) and the wings are rounded, unlike those of other falcons. The lifespan is 15 years in captivity.

== Behaviour ==
The Mauritius kestrel hunts by means of short, swift flights through forests. It is carnivorous, mainly eating geckos, dragonflies, cicadas, cockroaches, crickets, and small birds.

== Conservation ==
In pre-colonial times, the population was estimated to be between 175 and 325 breeding pairs. This small population was most likely caused by deforestation in the 18th century and by cyclones. However, the most severe decline was in the 1950s and 1960s due to indiscriminate DDT use and invasive species like cats, mongooses, and crab-eating macaques which killed the kestrels and their eggs. What was probably this species' closest relative in recent times, the Réunion kestrel, became extinct in the 1670s.

The quasi-extinction of the kestrel was noted by Mauritian naturalists Jean Vinson and France Staub, and it came to the attention of the American falcon expert Tom Cade, who, in the early 1970s, corresponded with the Conservator of Forests Leo Edgerly and they explored the idea of saving the Mauritius kestrels. Tom Cade had recently learned how to breed falcons in captivity and had bred American Kestrels and felt that similar approaches could be used to breed Mauritius Kestrels, and then to release the birds to the wild to bolster the population. Working with international conservation organisations (World Wildlife Fund and the International Council for Bird Preservation) and with the Mauritius Forestry Department a conservation project was hatched for the Mauritius Kestrel in 1973. The initial work was done by one of Cade's students, Stanley Temple, who studied them in the wild and started the captive breeding project.

The recorded population subsequently dropped to an all-time low of only four individuals in the wild in 1974, and it was considered the rarest bird in the world. Stanley Temple from Cornell University studied this species for two years and the first attempt in 1973 to breed the birds in captivity failed because the hatchling died when the incubator had a breakdown. Though conservation measures were immediately undertaken with the help of a breeding program by the Jersey Zoo (now Durrell Wildlife Park), the efforts to rescue this species initially failed because the eggs were not fertile.

In 1979, a new attempt was undertaken. With the help of Gerald Durrell, the Welsh biologist Carl Jones established a wildlife sanctuary on Île aux Aigrettes. He climbed on the trees and removed the eggs from the nests. This time the eggs were fertile, and Jones was able to rear the hatchlings in incubators.

=== Double clutching ===
Manipulation of the nesting biology with captive American kestrels (Falco sparverius) had been shown to be successful in the U.S. whereby if first clutches were removed, the bird would usually lay a second clutch. This 'double clutching' had demonstrated that young from second clutches do not differ in size or survival rates from those of first clutches.

During the 1981/82 breeding season, Carl G. Jones and his team in Mauritius removed first clutches from wild kestrels for artificial incubation. In addition, Jones supplemented their diet to enable the laying of a new egg after the first one had been removed, thereby averting any negative impact on the wild population.

Slowly the population increased, and during a census in 1984 50 individuals were estimated. Techniques for breeding, release, and "hacking" of young birds were improved, the captive breeding center becoming a pioneering research institution for tropical raptor and small falcon conservation. The captive breeding programme was scaled back in the early 1990s as a self-sustaining population was established. Since 1994, the programme serves only as a safeguard, should some catastrophe befall the wild population, and other rare endemics are now being cared for at the station (such as the pink pigeon or the Mauritius fody).

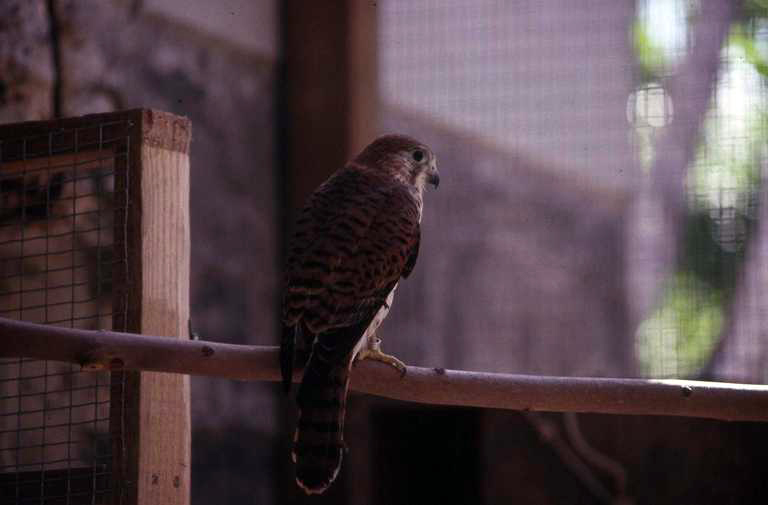
Bird awaiting reintroduction, 1989

In 2005, there were at least 800 mature birds; the remaining habitat allows for an estimated carrying capacity of circa 50–150 more (BirdLife International 2006a,b). They occur in the remaining forests of the island, especially in the Black River Gorges region. The species was downlisted to vulnerable by the IUCN in 1994 as releases of captive-bred birds became unnecessary. Little conservation action was deemed necessary only two decades—in Mauritius kestrel terms, a long lifetime or maybe four to five generations—after the species had stood at the very brink of extinction. Today, apart from routine monitoring to be able to assist individual couples that fail to establish breeding territories for lack of nesting facilities—a major limiting factor, the ongoing control of introduced predators is basically all that is being done to assist the species' survival.

In 2014, the species was uplisted to endangered due to a decline in a once increasing population. It is believed that there are fewer than 400 mature birds alive in the wild.

While some apparent inbreeding depression was noted in the captive birds, it was certainly lower than might be expected given that the effective population size was maybe 5 individuals during the mid-1970s. It is known that several genetic lineages of Mauritius kestrels have disappeared entirely during the 20th century population decline. However, the debilitating effects of DDT accumulation on the birds' health, and not inbreeding, are considered to have been the major cause for the failure of Temple's breeding program.

The evolutionary history of the birds seems to hold clues as to why: Mauritius is a volcanic island, and although the colonization of the island by kestrels cannot be dated with high precision, it was almost certainly some time before volcanic activity died down. The Mauritius kestrel population seems to have survived a prolonged period of volcanic activity, which must have kept the population small and fluctuating as habitat, food, and kestrels were destroyed by volcanic eruptions time and again. As near-panmictic conditions were sustained for many generations, alleles that might cause inbreeding depression were steadily removed by means of natural selection. The phenomenon that effective population sizes as low as 4–5 can be tolerated without pronounced inbreeding depression is also known from other small-island birds, such as Petroica traversi or the Laysan duck.

The classification as an endangered species is due to the same fact: on an island as small as Mauritius, chance events like volcanic eruptions (hardly likely in our time) or storms (common and possibly increasing in frequency and strength) can always wipe out major parts of a species' population.

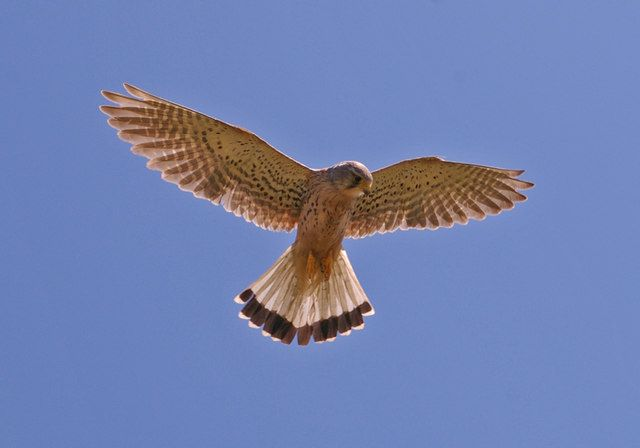
Mauritius kestrel in Kestrel Valley Mauritius

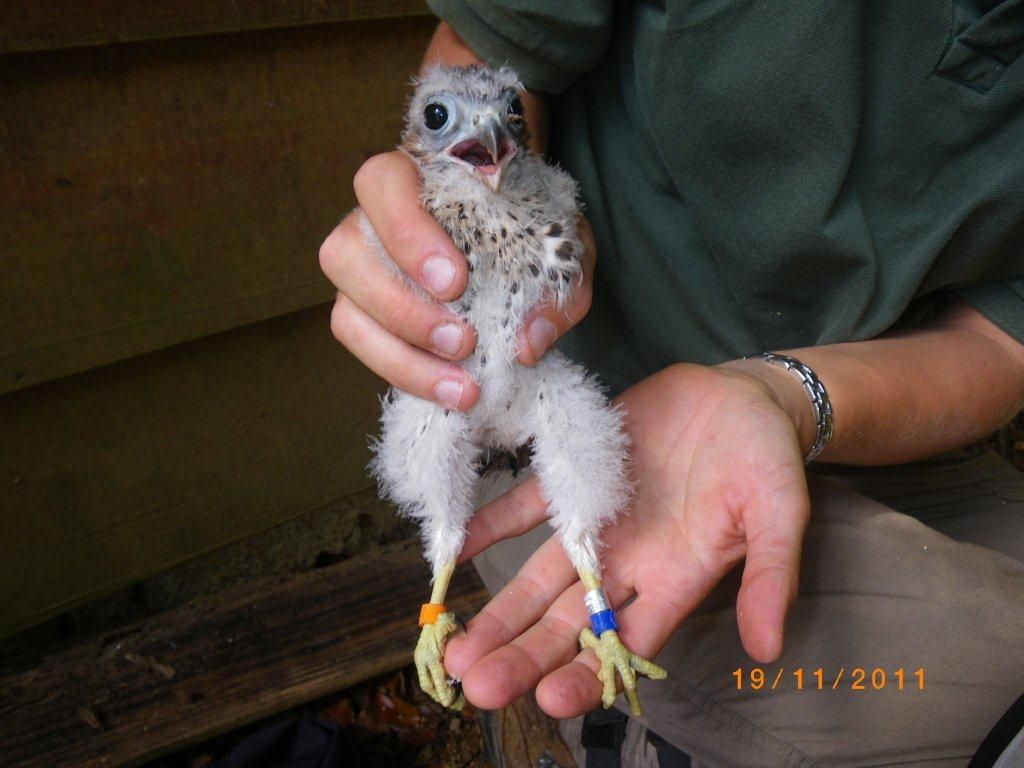
Mauritius kestrel born in Kestrel Valley Mauritius, 2011

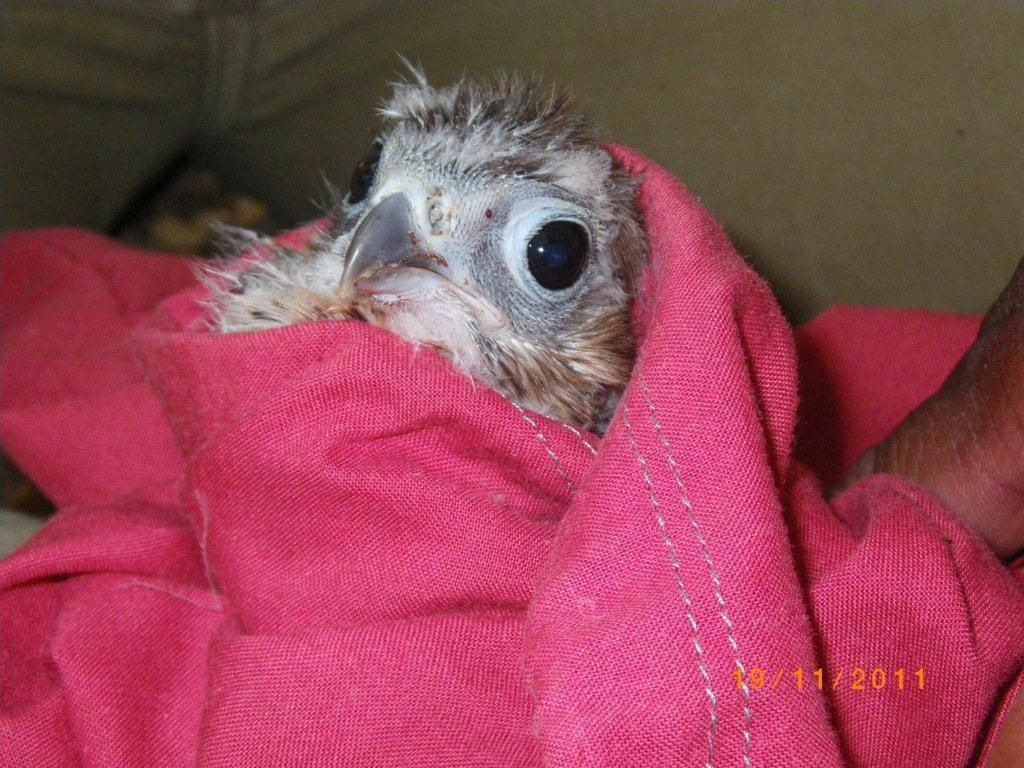
Mauritius kestrel born in Kestrel Valley Mauritius, 2011

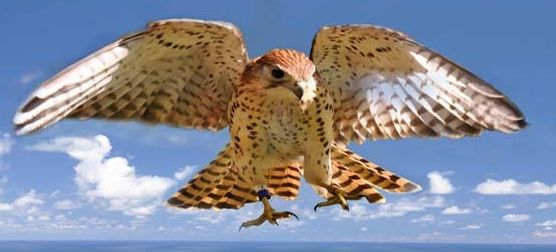
Mauritius kestrel in Kestrel Valley Mauritius
