= Mike Reynolds (conservationist) =

Michael William Reynolds (1931 – 14 April 2007) was an English advertising copywriter who became known for his parrot conservation efforts.

Reynolds started Bird Paradise in Hayle, Cornwall, United Kingdom in 1973, later to be re-named Paradise Park. This tropical bird garden was home to many birds, especially the parrot family, and as he came to understand these birds and the threats to many species in the wild he established the World Parrot Trust in 1989.
