= Operation Chough =

Bird conservation project in Cornwall, England

Operation Chough (Cornish: An Ragdres Palores) is a conservationist project which aims to create a viable population of red-billed chough (Pyrrhocorax pyrrhocorax) in Cornwall. This bird is widely considered a symbol of the county and its people and was once commonly seen throughout Cornish landscapes. In spite of this close association, the chough population experienced a severe decline in Cornwall through the 20th century, and had not been seen in the county since the early 1970s. In 2001, however, up to five birds were seen on The Lizard, thought to have come from Ireland. This pioneer population rapidly grew, with their offspring reaching nearly twenty birds. Since then, the Operation has made several efforts to keep this population viable by monitoring the nesting areas, promoting awareness of the cultural and environmental importance of the species to Cornwall and by releasing birds to further enlarge the genetic pool of the pioneer communities.

Dr Richard Meyer's thesis 'The Feeding Ecology of the Red-billed chough (Pyrrhocorax pyrrhocorax) in West Wales and the Feasibility of Re-establishment in Cornwall' is available online.
