= Prusten =

Communicative behavior by some members of the Felidae family

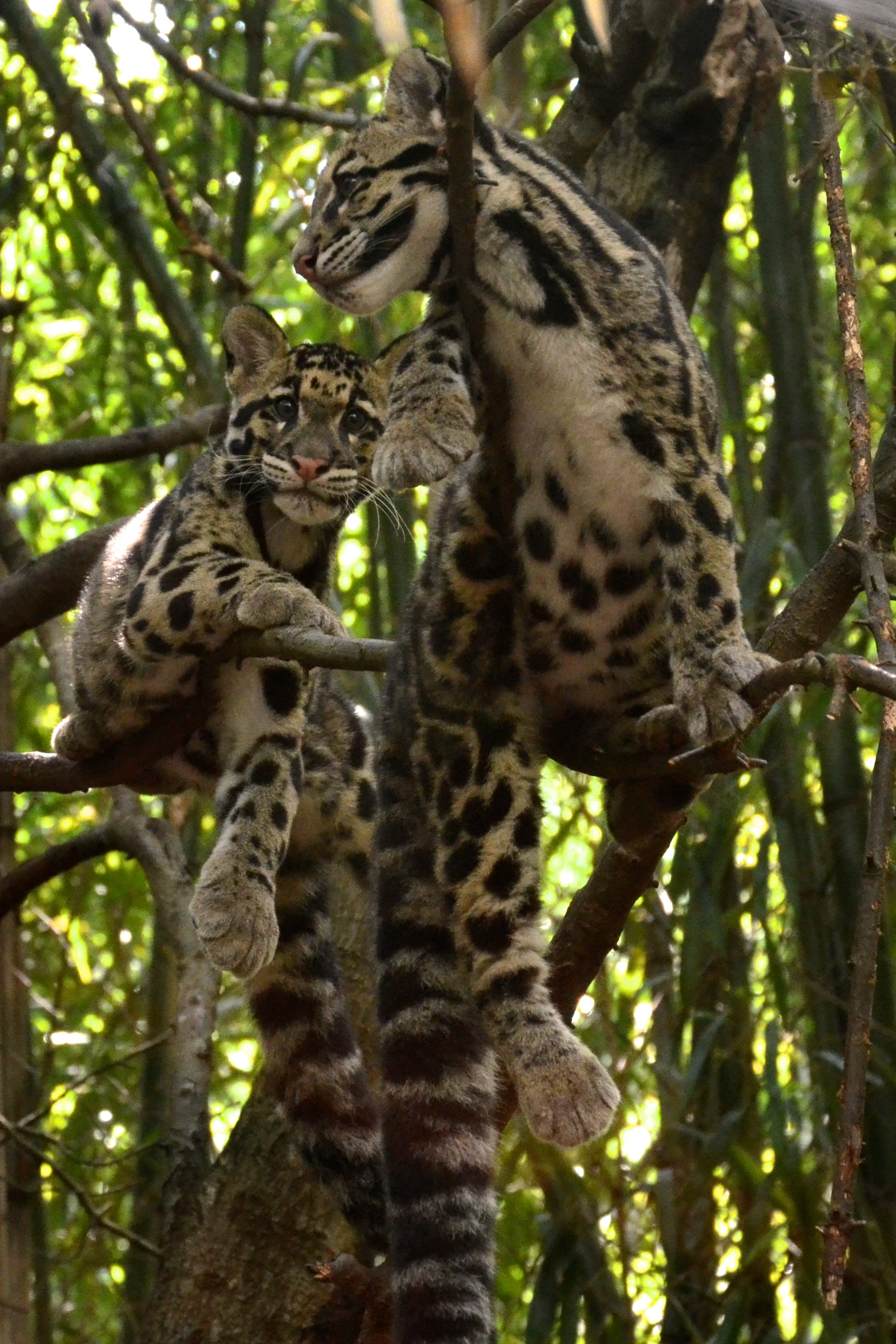
A pair of clouded leopards, one of the four felid species that use prusten to communicate.

Prusten is a form of communicative behaviour exhibited by some members of the family Felidae. Prusten is also referred to as chuffing (noun) or chuffle (verb). It is described as a short, low intensity, non-threatening vocalization. In order to vocalize a chuff, the animal's mouth is closed and air is blown through the nostrils, producing a breathy snort. It is typically accompanied by a head bobbing movement. It is often used between two cats as a greeting, during courtship, or by a mother comforting her cubs. The vocalization is produced by tigers, jaguars, snow leopards, clouded leopards and even polar bears. Prusten has significance in both the fields of evolution and conservation.

== Mechanism ==
In tigers, it has been found that low-pitched vocalizations, such as prusten, originate from vibrations of thick vocal folds in the larynx of the cat. Sound production is facilitated by the low threshold pressure required to oscillate the vocal folds, and low glottal resistance. The rough-sounding quality of the low-pitched vocalizations is likely generated by the complex pattern of vocal vibrations, caused by the excitation of multiple modes of oscillation simultaneously. Prusten also involves air being exhaled through the nose at the same time as through the mouth. This may represent an evolutionary shift from exclusively laryngeal vocalizations to mixed nasal and laryngeal sound production in the felid species that display the behaviour.

== Sound properties ==
Phonetically, prusten varies by species, however the basic structural pattern remains constant. More structural similarities occur between the two leopard species, and also between the tiger and jaguar. Individual sound pulses are more separated in the leopards in comparison to the other species, in which they tend to be more closely merged. Pulses may occur in pairs, in which a basal pulse and an upper-range pulse are produced simultaneously. This may reflect both laryngeal and nasal contributions to the vocalization, with the upper-frequency pulses produced nasally prevailing in tigers and jaguars.

The vocalization is produced by repeated, short pulses of air through the nose and mouth, each lasting an average of 0.37 seconds at an average frequency of 248 Hertz in tigers. Frequency compositions are similar throughout the four felid species, however they differ in intensity of low-frequency components. Total numbers of pulses produced per vocalization shows individual variation, but tend to fall in the range of 4-10 for all four species. Studies on tigers have shown that acoustic energy peaks in the low frequency range and the power wanes in higher frequencies, as in many tiger vocalizations, yet a distinct pattern allows prusten to be distinguished.

It has been found that tigers are most sensitive to lower frequencies and are likely able to hear in the infrasonic range, which is likely reflected in the production of calls such as prusten. It has also been hypothesized that hearing in the low frequency range is beneficial in communicating and locating prey in the low-visibility jungle habitats where these cats usually live.

== Purpose ==
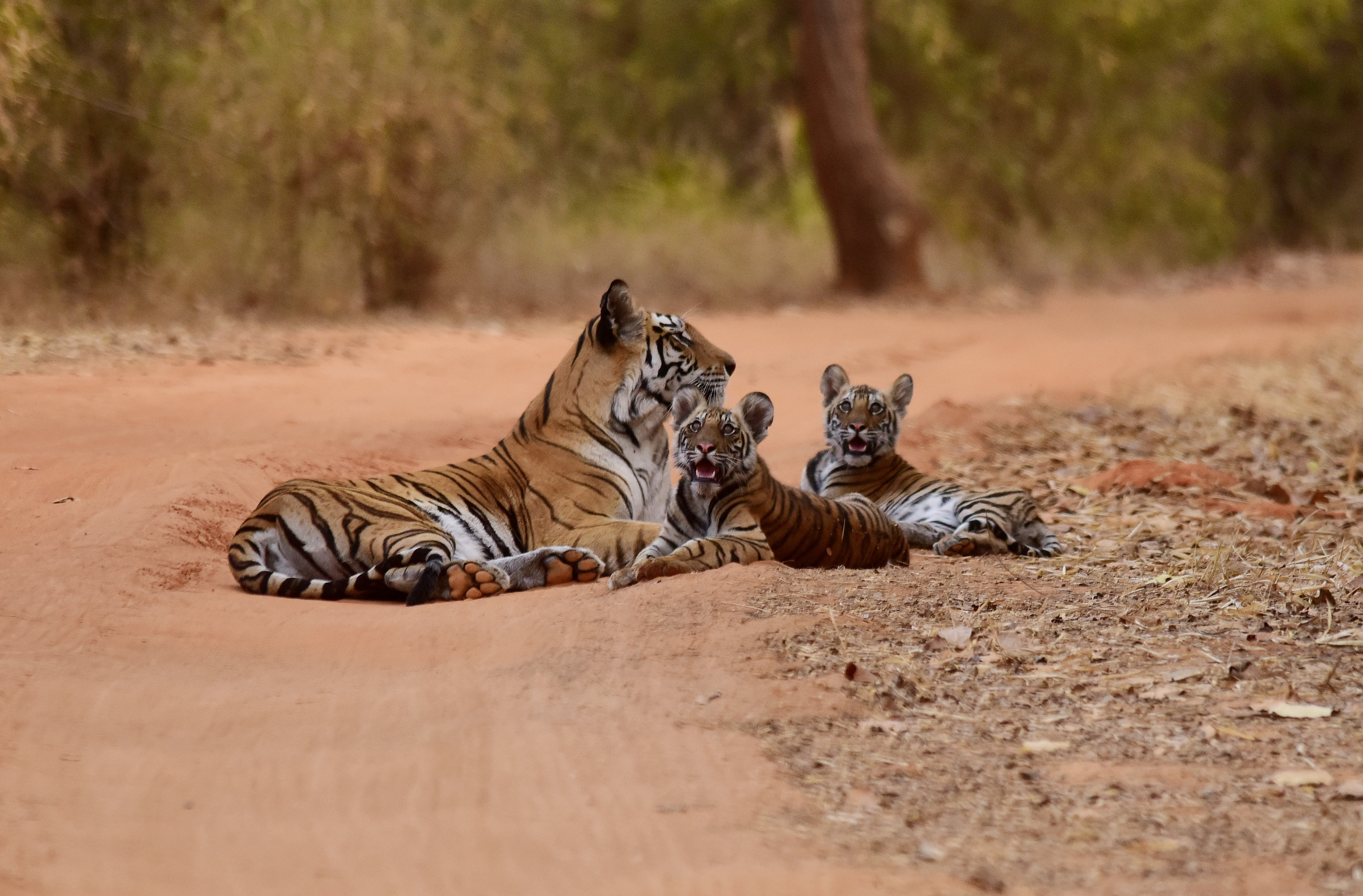
A tiger with her cubs; a scenario in which prusten may be expressed.

Prusten is social in nature, and may be produced for a variety of purposes. In captive tigers, it is more likely to be expressed when the animals are housed in groups rather than individually. Cats may produce the vocalization both to each other in greeting, or to familiar people such as zookeepers, as seen in clouded leopards. It is used to signal friendly intent to the other animal, and is generally reciprocated by other felids. It may also signify happiness, as content leopards tend to be more vocal and produce prusten more frequently.

In the clouded leopard and tiger, it has been observed that females often express this vocalization during estrous. This has also been noted in snow leopards, and is on occasion used by females to initiate mating with a male. It is frequently used by felid mothers when returning to her den in greeting to her cubs, and the cubs begin to produce this vocalization at around 5 weeks in snow leopards.

== Significance ==
This vocalization is distinct from friendly and non-threatening vocalizations produced by other felids, and thus has been described as a behavioural apomorphy. This distinction has been useful in determining evolutionary relationships between members of the family Felidae.

Prusten may be able to serve as an indication of well-being. It is also valuable for conservation purposes, along with other unique felid vocalizations, and may enable the location and monitoring of both individuals and populations in their habitats. Ongoing studies seek to determine if there are individual differences in the acoustic pattern of tiger vocalizations that would aid in monitoring and conservation practices. This hypothesis is the basis of The Prusten Project, which analyses individual tiger calls with the goal of developing and implementing non-invasive monitoring systems as a conservation tool.

== In non-felids ==
Chuffing has also been recorded in polar bears. Unlike in cats, polar bears do not chuff through the nostrils but through a partially open mouth.

== See also ==
- Purr
