= World Parrot Trust =

Parrot charity

The World Parrot Trust is an international charity dedicated to saving parrots.

== History ==
When the Trust was founded in 1989 at Paradise Park in Cornwall, UK, it was decided that the main objective was to promote the survival of all parrot species and the welfare of individual birds, both in the wild and in captivity. The Trust has achieved these aims by funding vital conservation work, research projects and educational programmes, both locally and internationally.

== Fundraising ==
Over its nearly thirty-year span the Trust has raised some $2.0 M US and has used these funds to begin and support conservation and welfare projects in 43 countries for 70 species of parrot. The Trust has expanded globally to include national branches in Africa, Australia, Belgium, Canada, Italy, Netherlands, Scandinavia, Spain and the United States.

== Parrot Action Plan ==
In 1999, the Trust joined with the IUCN to publish the Parrot Action Plan, to help protect 89 species of parrot from habitat destruction and international trade.
