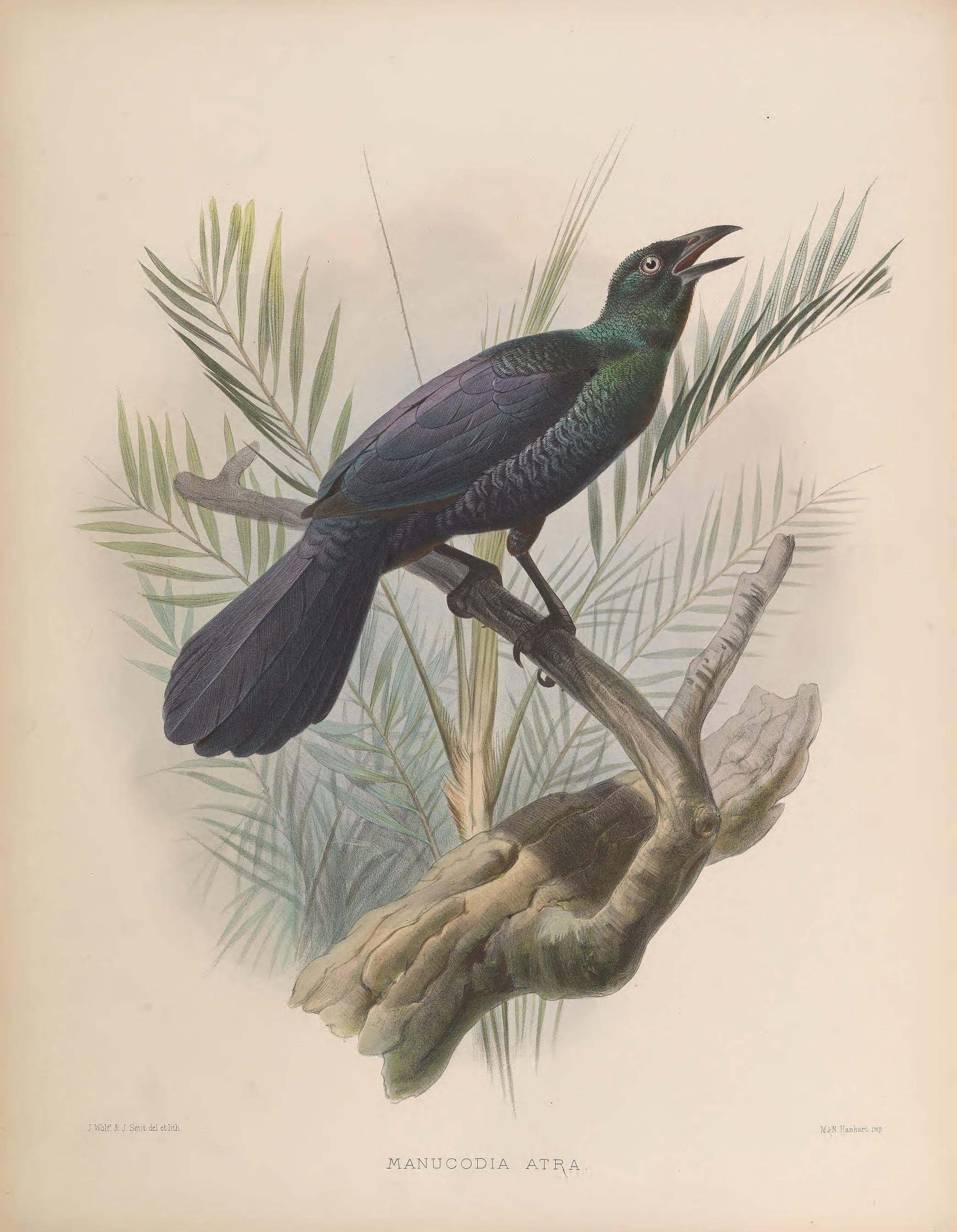

Conservation status
- Least Concern (IUCN 3.1)

Scientific classification
- Kingdom: Animalia
- Phylum: Chordata
- Class: Aves
- Order: Passeriformes
- Family: Paradisaeidae
- Genus: Manucodia
- Species: M. ater

Binomial name
- Manucodia ater (Lesson, 1830)

Synonyms
- Manucodia atra Sibley and Monroe (1990, 1993)

= Glossy-mantled manucode =

Species of bird

The glossy-mantled manucode (Manucodia ater) is a species of bird-of-paradise.

== Taxonomy ==
The glossy-mantled manucode was formerly described in 1830 as Phonygama ater by the French naturalist René Lesson based on a specimen collected near Dorey (now Manokwari), on the northwest coast of New Guinea. The specific epithet ater is Latin meaning "black", "dark", "dull" or "matt black". The glossy-mantled manucode is now placed in the genus Manucodia that was introduced in 1783 by Pieter Boddaert.

Two subspecies are recognised:

- M. a. ater (Lesson, RP, 1830) – New Guinea including west Papuan and Aru Islands
- M. a. alter Rothschild, LW & Hartert, EJO, 1903 – Tagula Island (Louisiade Archipelago, off southeastern New Guinea)

The subspecies M. a. alter has sometimes been considered as a separate species, the Tagula manucode.

== Distribution and habitat ==
It is widely distributed throughout the lowlands of New Guinea and nearby islands. Widespread and common throughout its large range, the glossy-mantled manucode is evaluated as least concern on the IUCN Red List of Threatened Species. It is listed on Appendix II of CITES. It is found in lowland rainforest, riverine and monsoon forests, forest edge, swamp-forest and woodlands.

== Description ==
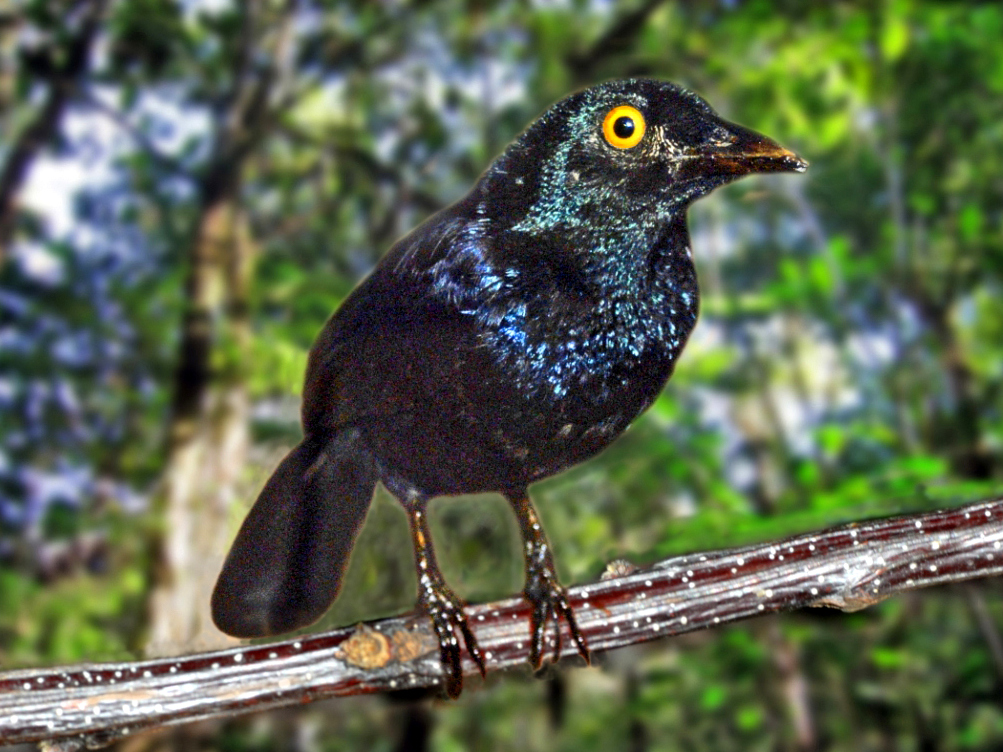
Manucodia ater

The glossy-mantled manucode is medium-sized, around 42 cm long, glossed green, blue and purple black with a red iris, black bill, long graduated tail and somewhat elongated upper breast and neck feathers. Both sexes are similar. The female is a slightly smaller than the male. In appearance, the glossy-mantled manucode resembles and is difficult to distinguish from its nearest relatives, the crinkle-collared and jobi manucodes.

== Behaviour ==
These birds have diurnal habits. They tend to move alone or in pairs, rarely in small groups: They spend most of their time looking for food among the branches of trees, ready to hide themselves in the thick vegetation when disturbed. They are not particularly timid, but it is easier to hear their calls or flights rather than observe them directly. The diet consists mainly of fruits, figs and arthropods.
