= L. nobilis =

L. nobilis may refer to:

- Laurus nobilis, the bay laurel, an aromatic evergreen tree or large shrub species native to the Mediterranean region
- Lebeda nobilis, a moth species found in Taiwan, China, India, Nepal and Indonesia
- Loboramphus nobilis, the Rothschild's lobe-billed bird of paradise, an enigmatic species of Bird of Paradise collected in Papua New Guinea for zoologist Lionel Walter Rothschild only known from the holotype

== See also ==
- Nobilis (disambiguation)
