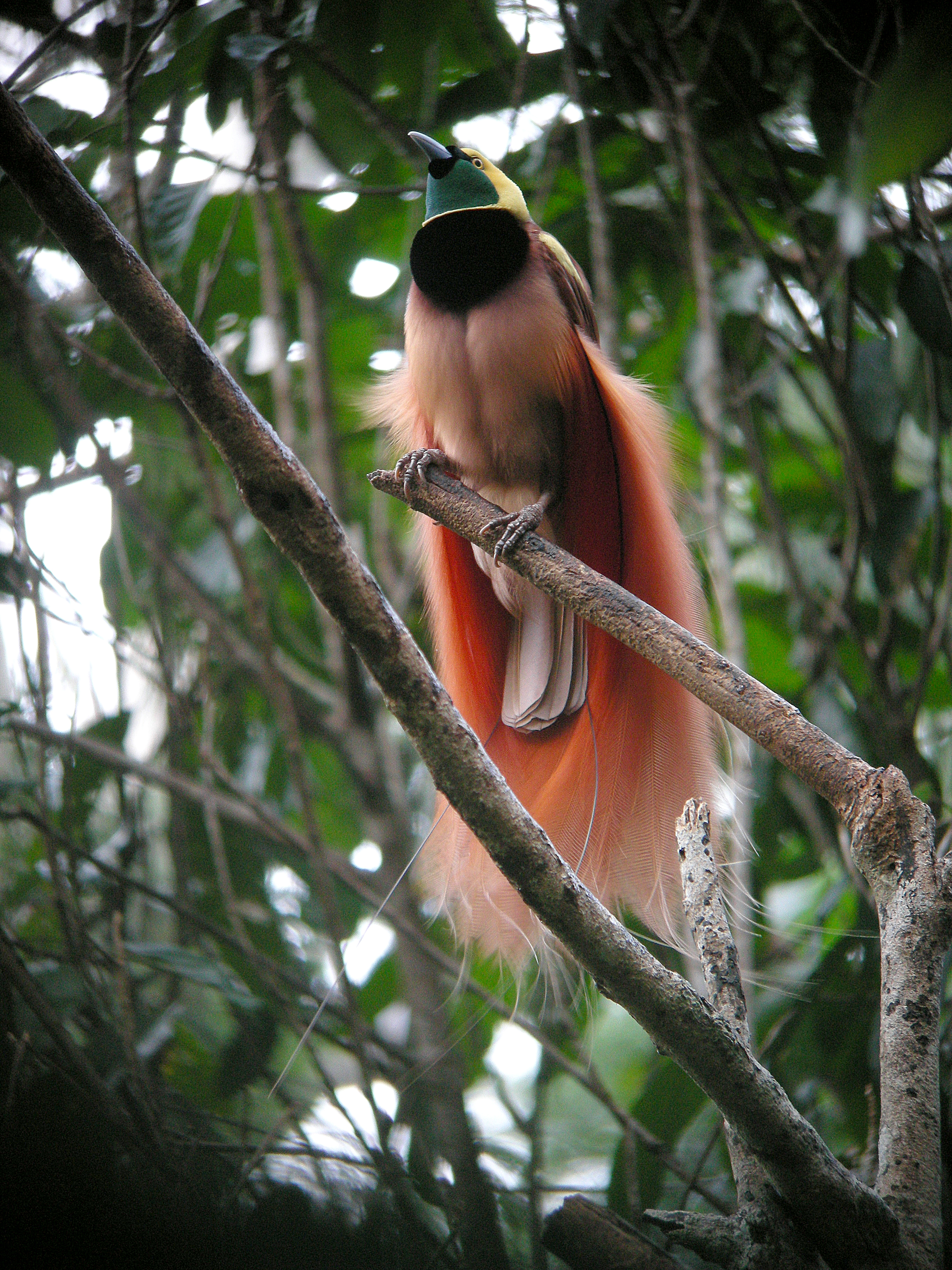
- Raggiana bird-of-paradise (Paradisaea raggiana)

Conservation status
- CITES Appendix II

Scientific classification
- Kingdom: Animalia
- Phylum: Chordata
- Class: Aves
- Order: Passeriformes
- Superfamily: Corvoidea
- Family: Paradisaeidae; Swainson, 1825

Genera
- 17 genera, 44 species

= Bird-of-paradise =

Family of birds of the order Passeriformes

The birds-of-paradise are members of the family Paradisaeidae of the order Passeriformes. They are found mainly in New Guinea, as well as eastern Australia and the Maluku Islands. The family has 44 species in 17 genera. The members of this family are perhaps best known for the plumage of the males of the species, the majority of which are sexually dimorphic. The males of these species tend to have very long, elaborate feathers extending from the beak, wings, tail, or head. For the most part, they are confined to dense rainforest habitats. The diet of all species is dominated by fruit and to a lesser extent arthropods. The birds-of-paradise have a variety of breeding systems, ranging from monogamy to lek-type polygamy. Notably, the long tail feather of the Greater bird-of-paradise is used as a decorative element in the Shripech, the royal crown of Nepalese monarchs.

A number of species are threatened by hunting and habitat loss.

== Taxonomy ==
The family Paradisaeidae is introduced (as Paradiseidae) in 1825 with Paradisaea as the type genus by the English naturalist William Swainson. (Note: In 1758 in the tenth edition of his Systema Naturae, Carl Linnaeus spelled the genus name as both Paradisea and Paradisaea. In 2012 the International Commission on Zoological Nomenclature suppressed the spelling Paradisea.) (Note: The authority for the family Paradisaeidae has traditionally been attributed to the Irish zoologist Nicholas Aylward Vigors. Vigors was constrained by the quinarian system and his use of Paradisaeae was not intended as a family name.) For many years the birds-of-paradise were treated as being closely related to the bowerbirds. Today while both are treated as being part of the Australasian lineage Corvida, the two are now thought to be only distantly related. The closest evolutionary relatives of the birds-of-paradise are the crow and jay family Corvidae, the monarch flycatchers Monarchidae, and the Australian mudnesters Struthideidae.

A 2009 study examining the mitochondrial DNA of all species to examine the relationships within the family and to its nearest relatives estimated that the family emerged 24 million years ago, earlier than previous estimates. The study identified five clades within the family, and placed the split between the first clade, which contains the monogamous manucodes and paradise-crow, and all the other birds-of-paradise, to be 10 million years ago. The second clade includes the parotias and the King of Saxony bird-of-paradise. The third clade provisionally contains several genera, including Seleucidis, the Drepanornis sicklebills, Semioptera, Ptiloris, and Lophorina, although some of these are questionable. The fourth clade includes the Epimachus sicklebills, Paradigalla, and the astrapias. The final clade includes the Cicinnurus and the Paradisaea birds-of-paradise.

The exact limits of the family have been the subject of revision as well. The three species of satinbird (the genera Cnemophilus and Loboparadisea) were treated as a subfamily of the birds-of-paradise, Cnemophilinae. In spite of differences in the mouth, foot morphology, and nesting habits they remained in the family until a 2000 study moved them to a separate family closer to the berrypeckers and longbills (Melanocharitidae). The same study found that the Macgregor's bird-of-paradise was actually a member of the large Australasian honeyeater family. In addition to these three species, a number of systematically enigmatic species and genera have been considered potential members of this family. The two species of melampitta, also from New Guinea, have been linked with the birds-of-paradise, but their relationships remain uncertain, more recently being linked with the Australian mudnesters. The silktail of Fiji has been linked with the birds-of-paradise many times since its discovery, but never formally assigned to the family. Recent molecular evidence now places the species with the fantails.

=== Phylogeny ===
A genus level phylogeny of the family has been determined by Martin Irestedt and collaborators.

- Paradisaeidae
  - Manucodiinae
    - Lycocorax – paradise-crows (2 species)
    - - Phonygammus – trumpet manucode
      - Manucodia – manucodes (4 species)
  - - Parotiinae
      - Pteridophora – King of Saxony bird-of-paradise
      - Parotia – parotias (6 species)
    - Paradisaeinae
      - - - Seleucidis – twelve-wired bird-of-paradise
          - Drepanornis – sicklebills (2 species)
        - - Semioptera – standardwing bird-of-paradise
          - - Lophorina – lophorinas (3 species)
            - Ptiloris – riflebirds (4 species)
      - - - Epimachus – sicklebills (2 species)
          - - Paradigalla – paradigallas (2 species)
            - Astrapia – astrapias (5 species)
        - - - Cicinnurus – King bird-of-paradise
            - Diphyllodes – birds-of-paradise (2 species)
          - - Paradisornis – blue bird-of-paradise
            - Paradisaea – birds-of-paradise (6 species)

=== Species ===
genus: Lycocorax

- Halmahera paradise-crow, Lycocorax pyrrhopterus
- Obi paradise-crow, Lycocorax obiensis

genus: Manucodia

- Glossy-mantled manucode, Manucodia ater
- Jobi manucode, Manucodia jobiensis
- Crinkle-collared manucode, Manucodia chalybatus
- Curl-crested manucode, Manucodia comrii

genus: Phonygammus

- Trumpet manucode, Phonygammus keraudrenii

genus: Paradigalla

- Long-tailed paradigalla, Paradigalla carunculata
- Short-tailed paradigalla, Paradigalla brevicauda

genus: Astrapia

- Arfak astrapia, Astrapia nigra
- Splendid astrapia, Astrapia splendidissima
- Ribbon-tailed astrapia, Astrapia mayeri
- Stephanie's astrapia, Astrapia stephaniae
- Huon astrapia, Astrapia rothschildi

genus: Parotia

- Western parotia, Parotia sefilata
- Carola's parotia, Parotia carolae
- Bronze parotia, Parotia berlepschi
- Lawes's parotia, Parotia lawesii
- Eastern parotia, Parotia helenae (Disputed)
- Wahnes's parotia, Parotia wahnesi

genus: Pteridophora

- King of Saxony bird-of-paradise, Pteridophora alberti

genus: Lophorina

- Greater lophorina, Lophorina latipennis
- Vogelkop lophorina, Lophorina superba
- Lesser lophorina, Lophorina minor

genus: Ptiloris

- Magnificent riflebird, Ptiloris magnificus
- Growling riflebird, Ptiloris intercedens
- Paradise riflebird, Ptiloris paradiseus
- Victoria's riflebird, Ptiloris victoriae

genus: Epimachus

- Black sicklebill, Epimachus fastosus
- Brown sicklebill, Epimachus meyeri

genus: Drepanornis

- Black-billed sicklebill, Drepanornis albertisi
- Pale-billed sicklebill, Drepanornis bruijnii

genus: Cicinnurus

- King bird-of-paradise, Cicinnurus regius
- Magnificent bird-of-paradise, Cicinurrus magnificus/Diphyllodes magnificus
- Wilson's bird-of-paradise, Cicinnurus respublica/Diphyllodes respublica

genus: Diphyllodes

- Magnificent bird-of-paradise, Diphyllodes magnificus
- Wilson's bird-of-paradise, Diphyllodes respublica

genus: Semioptera

- Standardwing bird-of-paradise, Semioptera wallacii

genus: Seleucidis

- Twelve-wired bird-of-paradise, Seleucidis melanoleucus

genus: Paradisaea

- Lesser bird-of-paradise, Paradisaea minor
- Greater bird-of-paradise, Paradisaea apoda
- Raggiana bird-of-paradise, Paradisaea raggiana
- Goldie's bird-of-paradise, Paradisaea decora
- Red bird-of-paradise, Paradisaea rubra
- Emperor bird-of-paradise, Paradisaea guilielmi

genus: Paradisornis

- Blue bird-of-paradise, Paradisornis rudolphi

=== Hybrids ===
Hybridisation occurs occasionally among birds-of-paradise, including between species from different genera. Species can hybridise despite substantial differences in morphology and courtship behaviour.

In 1930, the German ornithologist Erwin Stresemann systematically reviewed rare birds-of-paradise that had previously been described as distinct species and concluded that many were actually hybrids. By examining skins of these controversial specimens, he identified their likely parental species from their intermediate morphologies. Many of the 'species' described in the late 19th and early 20th centuries are now generally considered to be hybrids, with genomic analyses published in 2024 largely supporting earlier morphological assessments. Sequencing of museum specimens revealed that most were first-generation (F1) hybrids, while two were identified as intergeneric backcrosses, showing that some intergeneric hybrids can themselves reproduce and facilitate gene flow between species.

== Description ==
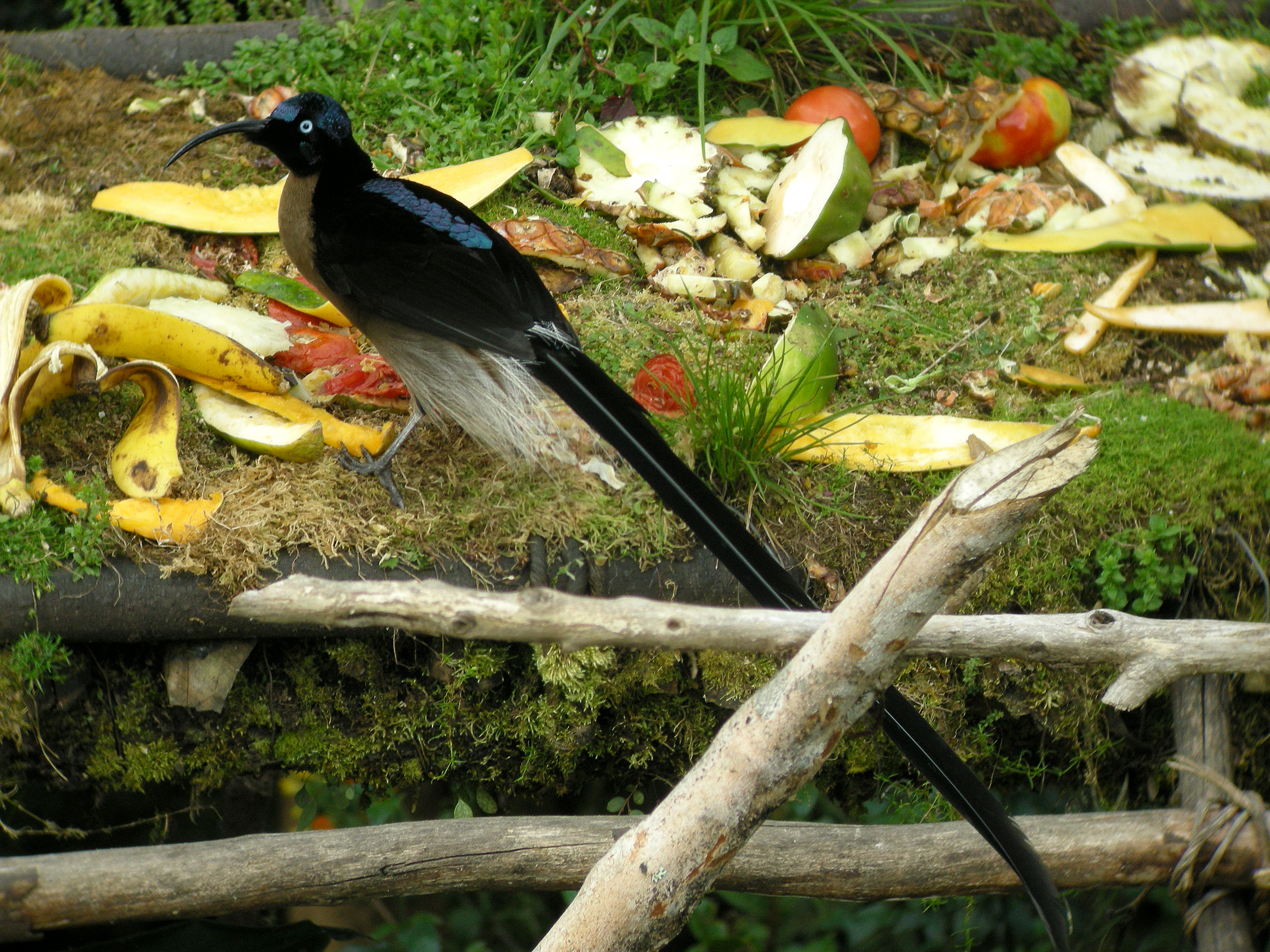
Sicklebills such as this brown sicklebill have decurved bills.

Birds-of-paradise are closely related to the corvids. Birds-of-paradise range in size from the king bird-of-paradise at 50 g (1.8 oz) and 15 cm (5.9 in) to the curl-crested manucode at 44 cm (17 in) and 430 g (15 oz). The male black sicklebill, with its long tail, is the longest species at 110 cm (43 in). In most species, the tails of the males are larger and longer than those of the females, the differences ranging from slight to extreme. The wings are rounded and, in some species, structurally modified on the males in order to make sound. There is considerable variation in the family with regard to bill shape. Bills may be long and decurved, as in the sicklebills and riflebirds, or small and slim like the Astrapias. As with body size, bill size varies between the sexes, although species where the females have larger bills than the males are more common, particularly in the insect-eating species.

Plumage variation between the sexes is closely related to the breeding system. The manucodes and paradise-crow, which are socially monogamous, are sexually monomorphic. So are the two species of Paradigalla, which are polygamous. All these species have generally black plumage with varying amounts of green and blue iridescence. They are even now considered biofluorescent. A study in the Royal Society Open Science found that the birds absorb light at high-energy wavelengths, then re-emit it at low-energy ones, visible to other birds as a bright yellow-green.The female plumage of the dimorphic species is typically drab to blend in with their habitat, unlike the bright attractive colours found on the males. Younger males of these species have female-like plumage, and sexual maturity takes a long time, with the full adult plumage not being obtained for up to seven years. This affords the younger males protection from predators of more subdued colours and also reduces hostility from adult males.

== Distribution and habitat ==
The centre of bird-of-paradise diversity is the large island of New Guinea; all but two genera are found in New Guinea and Australia. Those other two are the monotypic genera Lycocorax and Semioptera, both of which are endemic to the Maluku Islands, to the west of New Guinea. Of the four riflebirds in the genus Ptiloris, two are endemic to the coastal forests of eastern Australia, one occurs in both Australia and New Guinea, and one is only found in New Guinea. The only other genus to have a species outside New Guinea is Phonygammus, one representative of which is found in the extreme north of Queensland. The remaining species are restricted to New Guinea and some of the surrounding islands. Many species have very small ranges, particularly those with restricted habitat types such as mid-montane forest (like the black sicklebill) or island endemics (like the Wilson's bird-of-paradise).

The majority of birds-of-paradise live in tropical forests, including rainforests, swamps, and moss forests, nearly all of them solitary tree dwellers. Several species have been recorded in coastal mangroves. The southernmost species, the paradise riflebird of Australia, lives in sub-tropical and temperate wet forests. As a group the manucodes are the most plastic in their habitat requirements; in particular, the glossy-mantled manucode, which inhabits both forest and open savanna woodland. Mid-montane habitats are the most commonly occupied habitat, with thirty of the forty species occurring in the 1,000–2,000 m (3,300–6,600 ft) altitudinal band.

== Behaviour and ecology ==
=== Diet and feeding ===
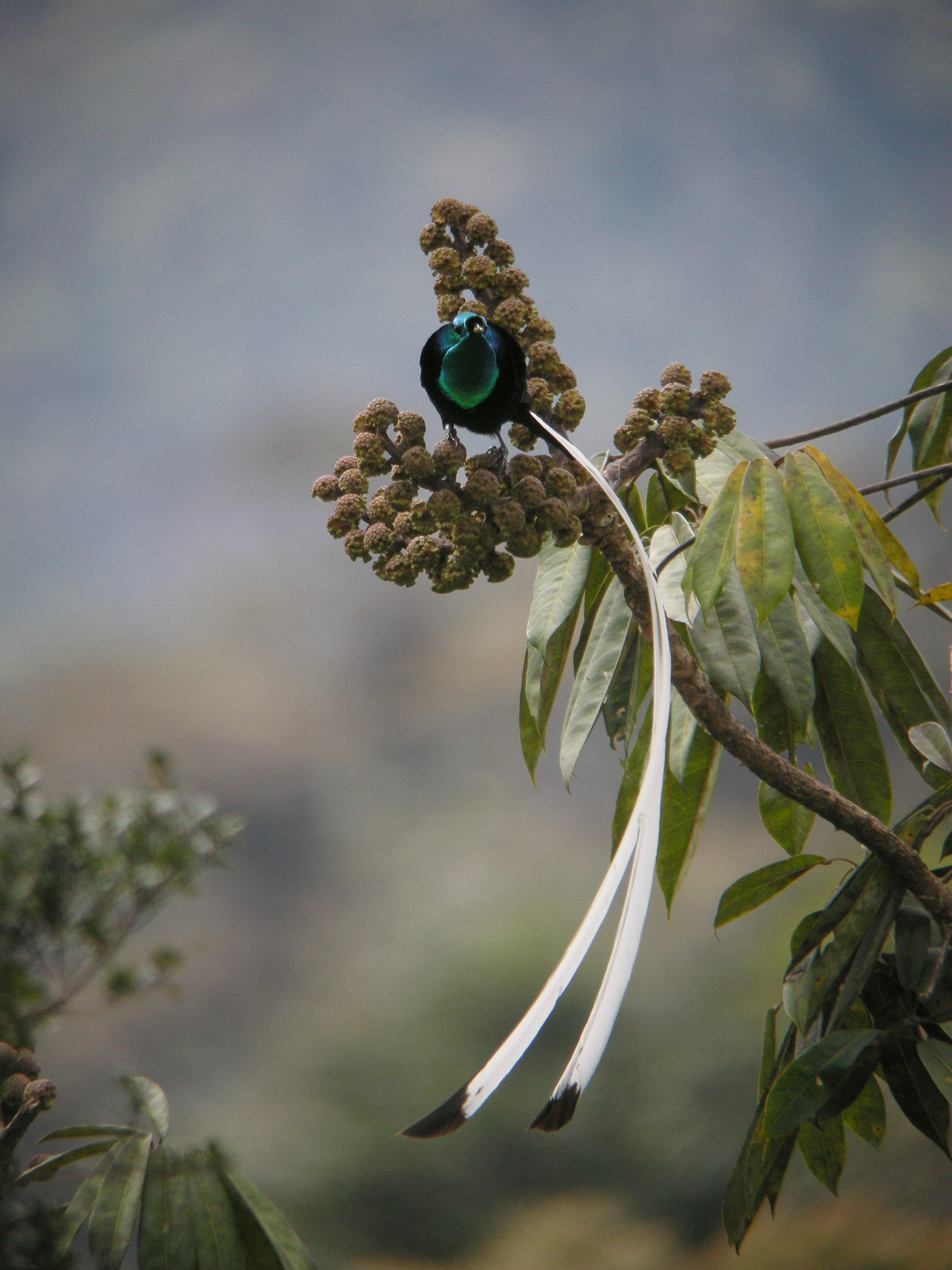
Fruits of the genus Heptapleurum are an important part of the diet of the ribbon-tailed astrapia.

The diet of the birds-of-paradise is dominated by fruit and arthropods, although small amounts of nectar and small vertebrates may also be taken. The ratio of the two food types varies by species, with fruit predominating in some species, and arthropods dominating the diet in others. The ratio of the two will affect other aspects of the behaviour of the species; for example, frugivorous species tend to feed in the forest canopy, whereas insectivores may feed lower down in the middle storey. Frugivores are more social than the insectivores, which are more solitary and territorial.

Even the birds-of-paradise that are primarily insect eaters will still take large amounts of fruit. The family is overall an important seed disperser for the forests of New Guinea, as they do not digest the seeds. Species that feed on fruit will range widely searching for fruit, and while they may join other fruit-eating species at a fruiting tree, they will not associate with them otherwise and will not stay with other species for long. Fruit is eaten while perched and not in the air, and birds-of-paradise are able to use their feet as tools to manipulate and hold their food, allowing them to extract certain capsular fruit. There is some niche differentiation in fruit choice by species and any one species will only consume a limited number of fruit types compared to the large choice available. For example, the trumpet manucode and crinkle-collared manucode will eat mostly figs, whereas the Lawes's parotia focuses mostly on berries and the greater lophorina and Raggiana bird-of-paradise take mostly capsular fruit.

=== Breeding ===
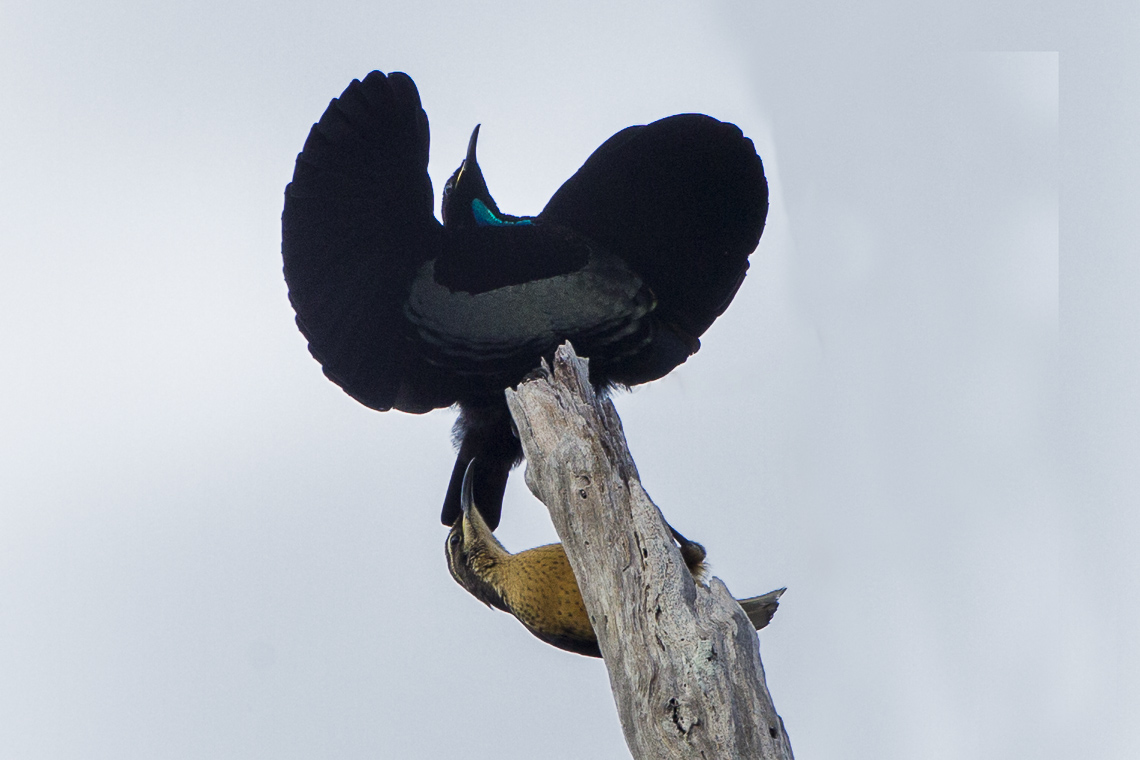
A male Victoria's riflebird displays and is inspected by a female.

Most species have elaborate mating rituals, with at least eight species exhibiting lek mating systems, including the genus Paradisaea. Others, such as the Cicinnurus and Parotia species, have highly ritualised mating dances. Across the family (Paradisaeidae), female preference is incredibly important in shaping the courtship behaviors of males and, in fact, drives the evolution of ornamental combinations of sound, color, and behavior. Males are polygamous in the sexually dimorphic species, but monogamous in at least some of the monomorphic species. Hybridisation is frequent in these birds, suggesting the polygamous species of bird of paradise are very closely related despite being in different genera. Many hybrids have been described as new species in the past, and doubt remains regarding whether some forms, such as Rothschild's lobe-billed bird-of-paradise, are valid.

Birds-of-paradise build their nests from soft materials, such as leaves, ferns, and vine tendrils, typically placed in a tree fork. The typical number of eggs in each clutch varies among the species and is not known for every species. For larger species, it is almost always just one egg, but smaller species may produce clutches of 2–3 eggs. Eggs hatch after 16–22 days, and the young leave the nest at between 16 and 30 days of age.

== Relationship with humans ==
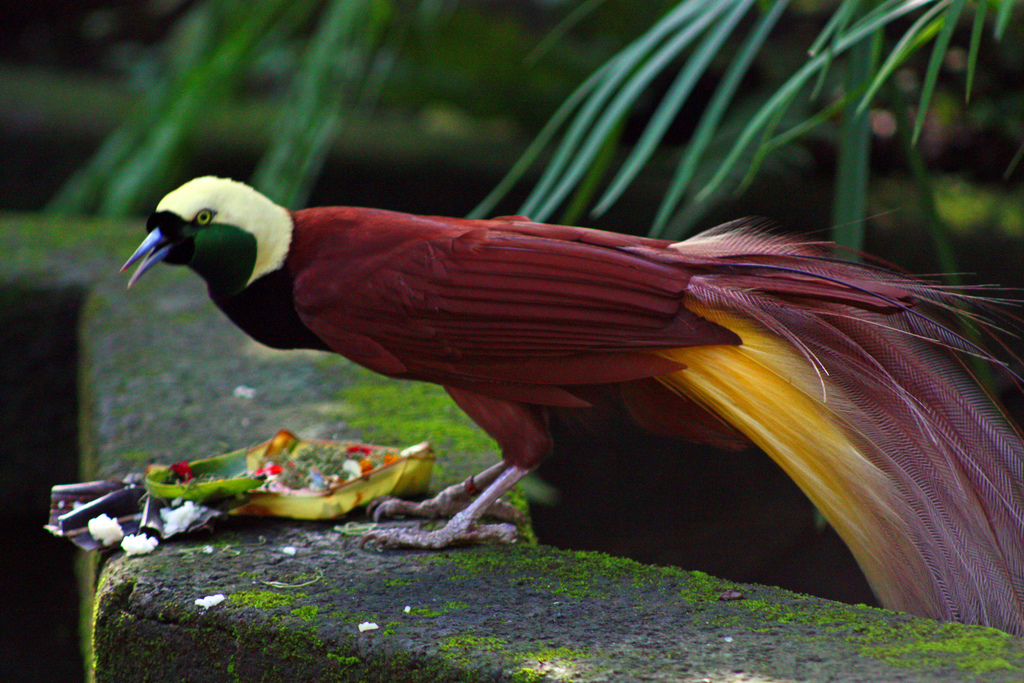
Male greater bird-of-paradise

Societies of New Guinea often use bird-of-paradise plumes in their dress and rituals, and the plumes were popular in Europe in past centuries as adornment for ladies' millinery. Hunting for plumes and habitat destruction have reduced some species to endangered status; habitat destruction due to deforestation is now the predominant threat.

Best known are the members of the genus Paradisaea, including the type species, the greater bird-of-paradise, Paradisaea apoda. This species was described from specimens brought back to Europe from trading expeditions in the early sixteenth century. These specimens had been prepared by native traders by removing their wings and feet so that they could be used as decorations. This was not known to the explorers, and in the absence of information, many beliefs arose about them. They were briefly thought to be the mythical phoenix. The often footless and wingless condition of the skins led to the belief that the birds never landed but were kept permanently aloft by their plumes. The first Europeans to encounter their skins were the voyagers in Ferdinand Magellan's circumnavigation of the Earth. Antonio Pigafetta wrote that "The people told us that those birds came from the terrestrial paradise, and they call them bolon diuata, that is to say, 'birds of God'." This is the origin of both the name "bird of paradise" and the specific name apoda – without feet. An alternate account by Maximilianus Transylvanus used the term Mamuco Diata, a variant of Manucodiata, which was used as a synonym for birds-of-paradise up to the 19th century.

=== Birdwatching ===
In recent years the availability of pictures and videos about birds of paradise on the internet has raised the interest of birdwatchers around the world. Many of them fly to West Papua to watch various species of birds of paradise from Wilson's bird-of-paradise (Diphyllodes respublica) and red bird-of-paradise (Paradisaea rubra) in Raja Ampat to lesser bird-of-paradise (Paradisaea minor), magnificent riflebird (Ptiloris magnificus), king bird-of-paradise (Cicinnurus regius), Vogelkop lophorina (Lophorina niedda), and magnificent bird-of-paradise (Diphyllodes magnificus) in Susnguakti forest.

This activity significantly reduces the number of local villagers who are involved in the hunting of paradise birds.

=== Hunting ===
Hunting of birds of paradise has occurred for a long time, possibly since the beginning of human settlement. It is a peculiarity that among the most frequently hunted species, males start mating opportunistically even before they grow their ornamental plumage. This may be an adaptation to maintaining population levels in the face of hunting pressures, which have probably been present for hundreds of years.

The naturalist, explorer, and author Alfred Russel Wallace spent six years in the region, which he chronicled in The Malay Archipelago (published in 1869). His expedition team shot, collected, and described many specimens of animals and birds, including the great, king, twelve-wired, superb, red, and six-shafted birds of paradise.

Hunting to provide plumes for the millinery trade was extensive in the late 19th and early 20th century, but today the birds have legal protection except for hunting at a sustainable level to fulfill the ceremonial needs of the local tribal population. In the case of Pteridophora plumes, scavenging from old bowerbird bowers is encouraged.

=== Other examples ===
- The southern hemisphere constellation Apus represents a bird-of-paradise;
- An adult-plumaged male Raggiana bird-of-paradise is depicted on the flag of Papua New Guinea, designed by Susan Karike.
- Various members of the family were profiled by David Attenborough in Attenborough in Paradise;
- The Indonesian Army maintains a military area command in Papua named Kodam XVII/Cenderawasih, with "cenderawasih" being the Indonesian name for the bird-of-paradise;
- Cenderawasih University in Jayapura, Papua, is named for the bird;
- Cendrawasih Stadium, the main sports venue of Biak Numfor Regency, Papua, is named for the bird;
- The short-lived football club Cendrawasih Papua F.C. in Liga Primer Indonesia was named for the bird;
- A plume from a bird-of-paradise was used in the Shripech, the royal crown worn by the King of Nepal, before the abolishment of the monarchy in 2008. The crown is currently housed in the Narayanhiti Palace Museum.

== See also ==
- Sexual selection
- Fisherian runaway
- Shripech

== Bibliography ==
- Laman, Tim; Scholes, Edwin (2012). Birds of Paradise, Revealing the World's Most Extraordinary Birds (PDF). National Geographic Society. ISBN 978-1-426-20958-1.
