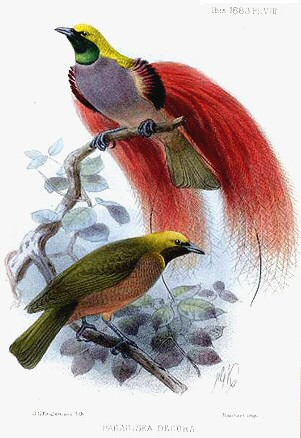
- Illustration of male (above) and female (below)

Conservation status
- Vulnerable (IUCN 3.1)

Scientific classification
- Kingdom: Animalia
- Phylum: Chordata
- Class: Aves
- Order: Passeriformes
- Family: Paradisaeidae
- Genus: Paradisaea
- Species: P. decora

Binomial name
- Paradisaea decora Salvin & Godman, 1883

= Goldie's bird-of-paradise =

Species of bird

Goldie's bird-of-paradise (Paradisaea decora) is a species of bird-of-paradise.

Endemic to Papua New Guinea, the Goldie's bird-of-paradise is distributed in the hill forests of Fergusson and Normanby Island of the D'Entrecasteaux Archipelago, eastern Papuan Islands. The diet consists mainly of fruits.

The name commemorates the Scottish collector Andrew Goldie, who discovered the bird in 1882.

Due to ongoing habitat loss, limited range and overhunting in some areas, the Goldie's bird-of-paradise is evaluated as Vulnerable on the IUCN Red List of Threatened Species. It is listed on Appendix II of CITES.

== Description ==
Goldie's bird-of-paradise is large, approximately 33 cm long, and olive-brown. The male has a yellow and dark green plumage with a lavender grey breast, yellow iris and grey colored bill, mouth and feet. It is adorned with large crimson ornamental flank plumes and two long tail wires. The male is distinguished from other Paradisaea species by its lavender grey breast plumage. Unadorned female has an olive-brown plumage with cinnamon-brown below.
