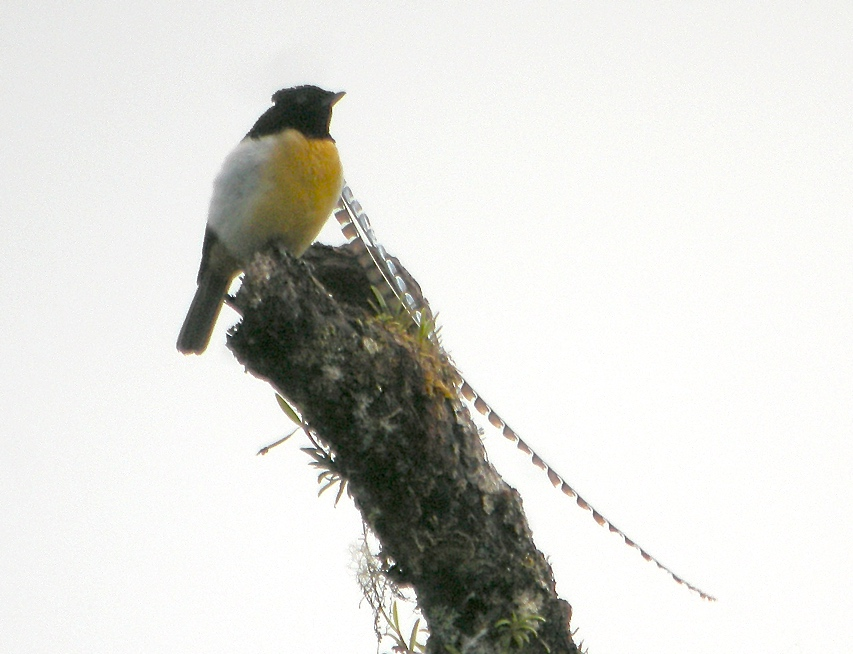
- Male in Papua New Guinea

Conservation status
- Least Concern (IUCN 3.1)

Scientific classification
- Kingdom: Animalia
- Phylum: Chordata
- Class: Aves
- Order: Passeriformes
- Family: Paradisaeidae
- Genus: Pteridophora; A.B. Meyer, 1894
- Species: P. alberti

Binomial name
- Pteridophora alberti Meyer, 1894

Subspecies
- P. a. alberti P. a. buergersi P. a. hallstromi

= King of Saxony bird-of-paradise =

Species of bird

The King of Saxony bird-of-paradise (Pteridophora alberti) is a bird in the bird-of-paradise family (Paradisaeidae). It is the only member of the genus Pteridophora. It is endemic to montane forest in New Guinea.

== Nomenclature ==
Adolf Bernard Meyer of the Dresden Museum described this species in the December 1894 bulletin of the British Ornithologist's Club. Both the common name "King of Saxony" and the scientific specific name "alberti" were given to honour to the then king of Saxony, Albert of Saxony, whose wife gave her name to the Queen Carola's parotia.

== Description ==
The adult King of Saxony bird-of-paradise is approximately 22 cm long. The male is black and yellow with a dark brown iris, brownish-grey legs, a black bill with a bright aqua-green gape, and two remarkably long (up to 50 cm) scalloped, enamel-blue brow-plumes that can be independently erected at the bird's will. The unadorned female is greyish brown with barred underparts.

The male's ornamental head plumes are so bizarre that, when the first specimen was brought to Europe, it was thought to be a fake.

== Distribution ==
The King of Saxony bird-of-paradise inhabits the montane forests of New Guinea, and is distributed from the Weyland Mountains in Western New Guinea to the Kratke Range and Mount Giluwe in Papua New Guinea between 1,300–2,850 meters above mean sea level, but usually between 1,800–2,500 meters above sea level.

Moulted head-plumes in good condition are sought by male Archbold's bowerbirds for use as decorations, and in turn collected from the courtship bowers by humans. Males are also hunted for their highly prized long plumes used by natives for ceremonial decoration, but despite this the species remains fairly common in parts of its range. It is considered to be of least concern on the IUCN Red List of Threatened Species. It is listed on Appendix II of CITES.

== Behaviour ==
Adult males are territorial. The male guards its territory from perches placed in the tops of tall trees, and from these perches sings to compete with males in neighbouring territories. While singing, the male moves his occipital plumes about. In 1996 David Attenborough filmed the first ever footage of the mating ritual of the bird.

The diet consists mainly of fruits, berries and arthropods.

=== Courtship ===
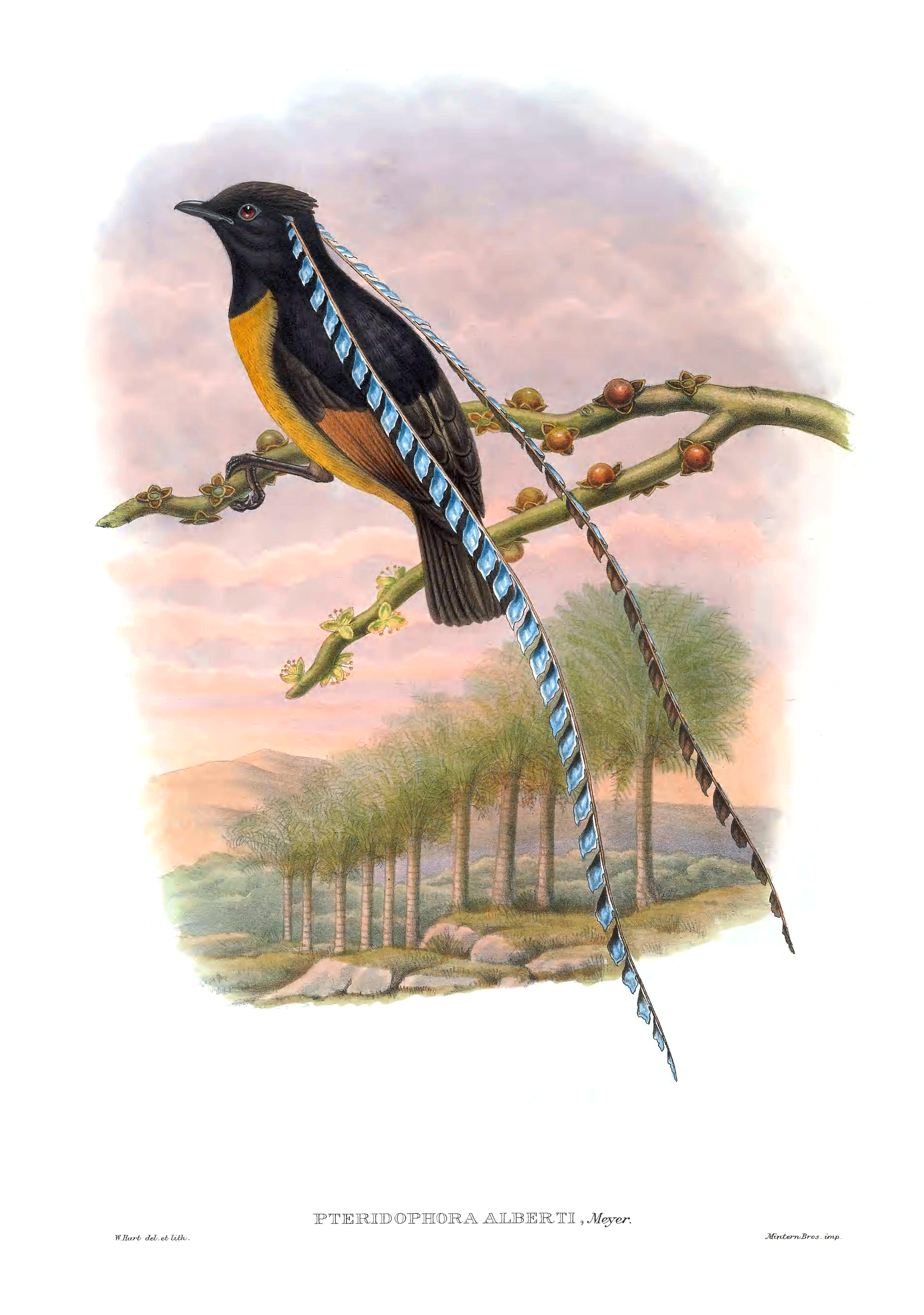
Illustration of male

The King of Saxony Bird of Paradise's mating courtship behavior consists of a combination of vocalizations and physical maneuvers, enhanced by its magnificent and unique plumage. The King of Saxony's occipital feathers or "head wires" are one of a kind as they no longer possess their regular feather structure, but instead are eye-catching ornaments that possess no functionality. These feathers can be twice as long as the body of the male King of Saxony, and have evolved as the result of female selection, in which females select males based upon indirect genetic benefits which increase offspring fitness. This process occurs due to male's lack of participation in the process of raising offspring, forcing females to assess male fitness through courtship rituals, details of which are below.

==== Song and dance ====
The male King of Saxony will perch on the forest canopy in exploded leks and sing to attract females. These exploded leks place males much further apart than a traditional lek but still in a single relative location, allowing females to move from male to male to choose the right mate with relative ease. The songs sung by the males are reminiscent of "radio-static hisses", can last from four to five seconds, and have been selected for over time based upon their ability to attract females. Songs are repeated at one minute intervals until a female arrives. Male King of Saxony dance maneuvers initiate once a female is in his vicinity and usually use the movement of their unique occipital plumes, flaring them up and down as a tantalizing eye-catcher to pique female interest. These enormous feathers are the key component in the visual presentation of males. Once females are enticed, males will bounce their mantle cape and breast shield feathers up and down. If the female likes what she sees, she will invite the males to the understory of the forest where the courtship continues. Here, the male perches on a vine, connected to, but below the female and proceeds to rhythmically bounce up and down, which in turn, causes her vine to vibrate. If she continues to be interested in the male, he will hop up next to her, erecting his mantle cape and breast shield and wagging his head from side to side to get his head wires to swirl about the female. These behaviors are most common between July and February, but can occur at other times of the year as well.
