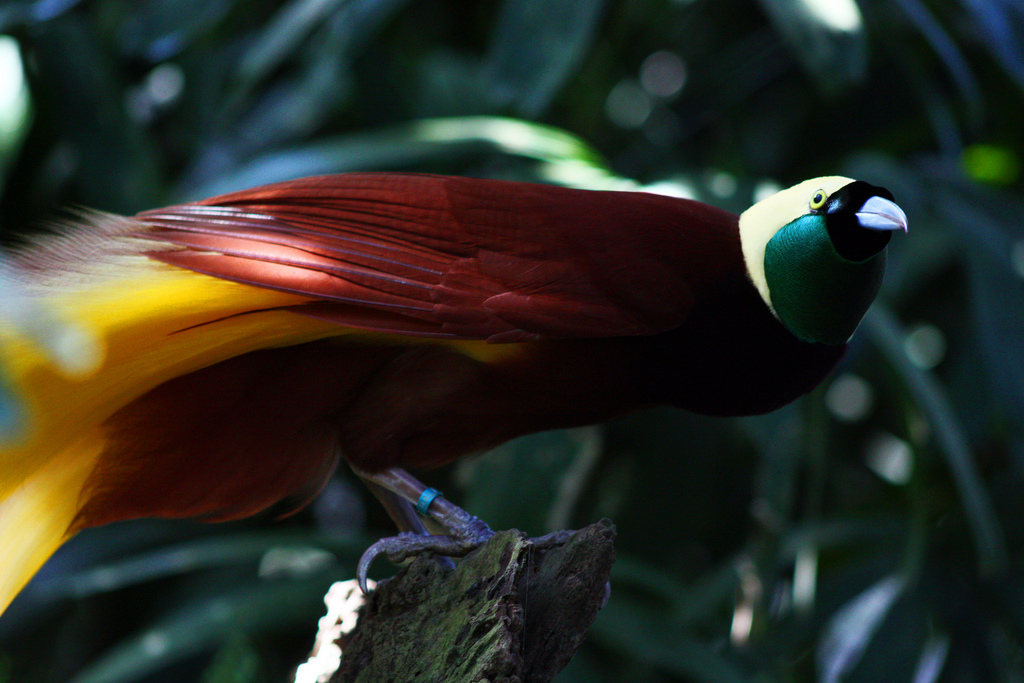
- Male at Bali Bird Park
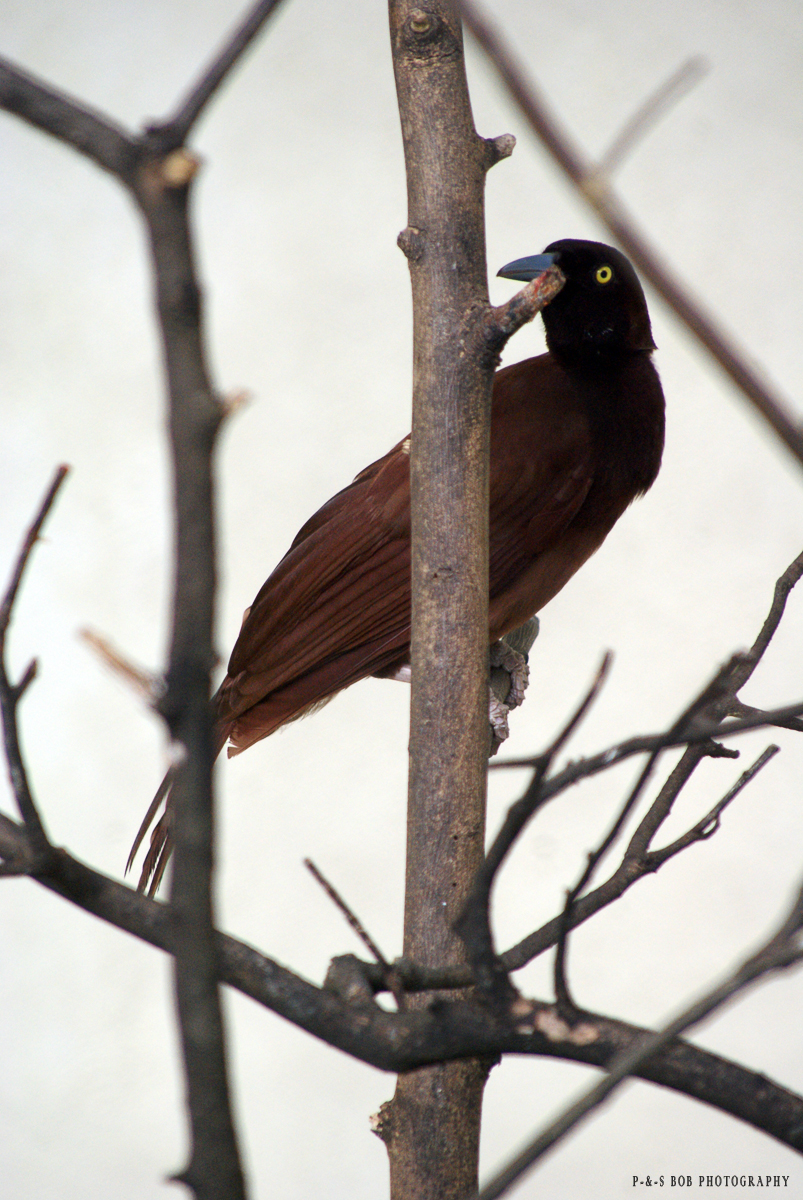
- Female at Kuala Lumpur Bird Park

Conservation status
- Least Concern (IUCN 3.1)
- CITES Appendix II

Scientific classification
- Kingdom: Animalia
- Phylum: Chordata
- Class: Aves
- Order: Passeriformes
- Family: Paradisaeidae
- Genus: Paradisaea
- Species: P. apoda

Binomial name
- Paradisaea apoda Linnaeus, 1758
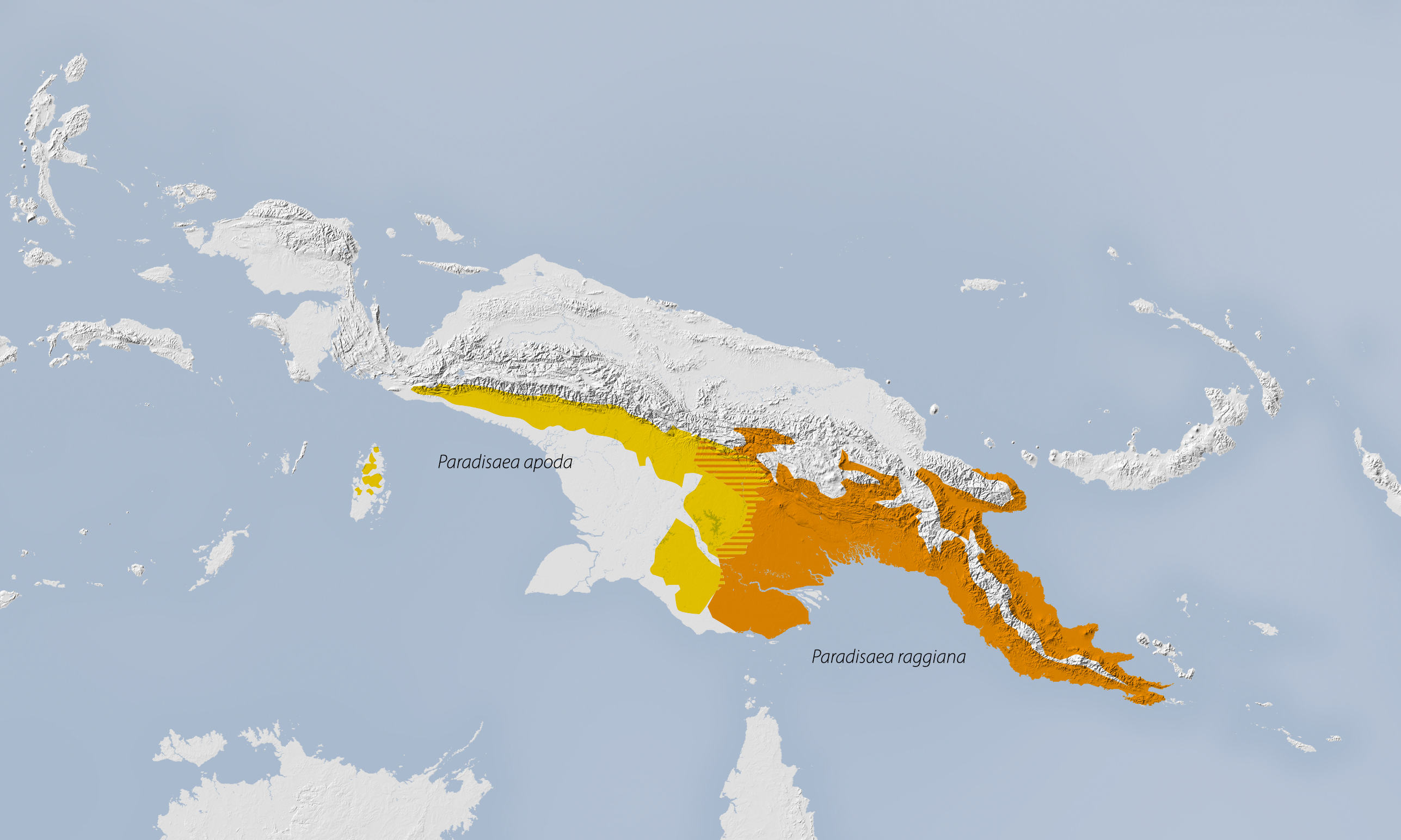
- Paradisaea apoda Paradisaea raggiana

= Greater bird-of-paradise =

Species of bird

The greater bird-of-paradise (Paradisaea apoda) is a bird-of-paradise in the genus Paradisaea.

Carl Linnaeus named the species Paradisaea apoda, or "legless bird-of-paradise", because early trade skins to reach Europe were prepared without wings or feet by the indigenous New Guinean people; this led to the misconception that these birds were beautiful visitors from paradise that were kept aloft by their plumes and never touched the earth until death.

Greater bird-of-paradise on Indonesian rupiah
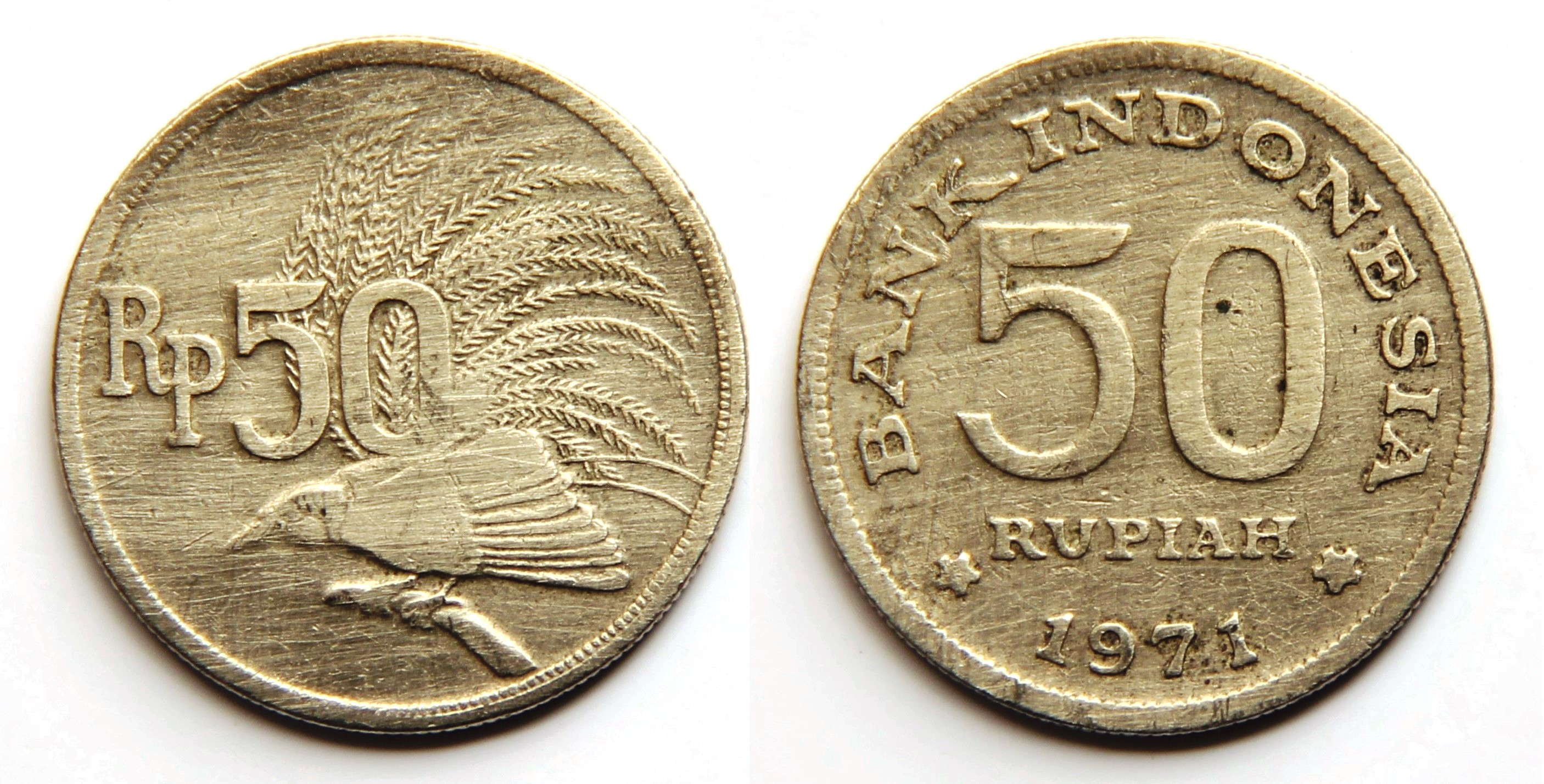
First side of the image: Obverse: Greater bird-of-paradise on a branch and face value.
Second side of the image: Reverse: Face value surrounded by country and year.
Total 1,035,435,000 coins minted in 1971. Coin demonetized in 2002.

== Taxonomy ==
The greater bird-of-paradise was formally described by the Swedish naturalist Carl Linnaeus in 1758 in the tenth edition of his Systema Naturae under the current binomial name Paradisaea apoda. The genus name is from the Late Latin paradisus meaning "paradise", due to the voyagers in Ferdinand Magellan's circumnavigation of the Earth, the first Europeans to encounter this animals. Antonio Pigafetta, the main chronicler of that expedition, wrote that "The people told us that those birds came from the terrestrial paradise, and they call them bolon diuata, that is to say, 'birds of God'." The specific epithet apod combines the Ancient Greek a- meaning "lacking" and pous, podus meaning "foot". Although several subspecies have been described, these are now not recognised and the greater bird-of-paradise is considered to be monotypic.

== Description ==
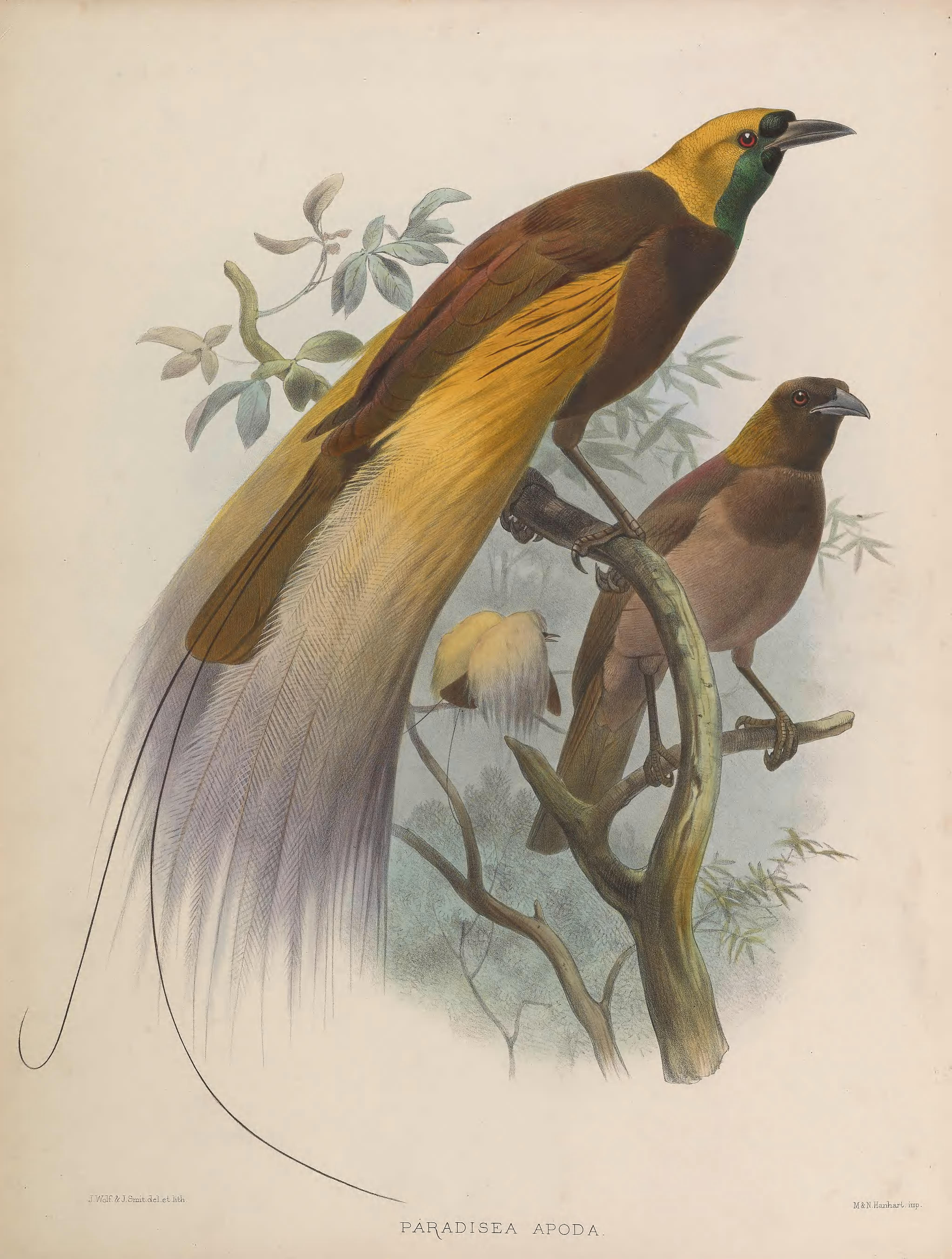
Illustration of male and female.

The greater bird-of-paradise is the largest member of the genus Paradisaea, with "the most glamorous display in the bird world". The males measure up to 43 cm (17 in), excluding the long, twin tail-wires. The female is smaller, at roughly 35 cm (14 in). The plumage of this species is highly sexually dimorphic; the male is highly colourful, with a notable profusion of yellow tail feathers which are used in courtship displays. The flank plumes are yellow at the base but turn white, streaked with maroon-red. The male birds also have an iridescent-green face, with an equally iridescent yellow-and-silver crown, head, and nape; the rest of the body plumage is largely maroon-brown. The female has unbarred, though still richly-hued, maroon-brown plumage, superficially resembling a larger, albeit tropical-dwelling, male Brewer's blackbird (Euphagus cyanocephalus). In both sexes, the iris is yellow and the bill is blue.

== Distribution ==
The greater bird-of-paradise is distributed to lowland and hill forests of southwest New Guinea and Aru Islands, Indonesia. The diet consists mainly of fruits, seeds, and small insects. A small population was introduced by Sir William Ingram in 1909-1912 to Little Tobago Island of West Indies in an attempt to save the species from extinction due to overhunting for plume trades. The introduced populations survived until at least 1966, but have likely been extirpated since then. The bird still appears on various coins and banknotes of the Trinidad and Tobago dollar, reflecting its former presence there.

== Behaviour and ecology ==
=== Diet ===
Greater birds-of-paradise, like the majority of their relatives, are frugivorous insectivores (less-technically considered "omnivores"), being highly fond of tree fruits and arthropods; their consumption of specific fruits, such as those of certain mahogany (Swietenia sp) and nutmeg (Myristica sp) trees, assists the different botanical species in colonising new areas, thus promoting biodiversity in the jungle. Fruits are swallowed whole, and the seeds are passed intact through the digestive system before ultimately being excreted with the bird's guano, within which they will germinate from the nitrogen and other elements present. The females are often found foraging in association with other bird-of-paradise species, and even other unrelated avian species. Wallace noted, in The Malay Archipelago, that the birds become active and forage in the pre-dawn hours before sunrise, when their loud wawk-wawk, wǒk-wǒk-wǒk cries resound throughout the forest, and they move about in different directions in their pursuit of food.

=== Courtship and breeding ===
Male greater birds-of-paradise, as polygynous breeders, experience female selection, in which females choose male mates based upon indirect genetic benefits which increase offspring fitness. Since males do not contribute to offspring in any other way (i.e. through parental care), females have to assess male fitness through courtship rituals, details of which are in the following sections.

==== Dances ====
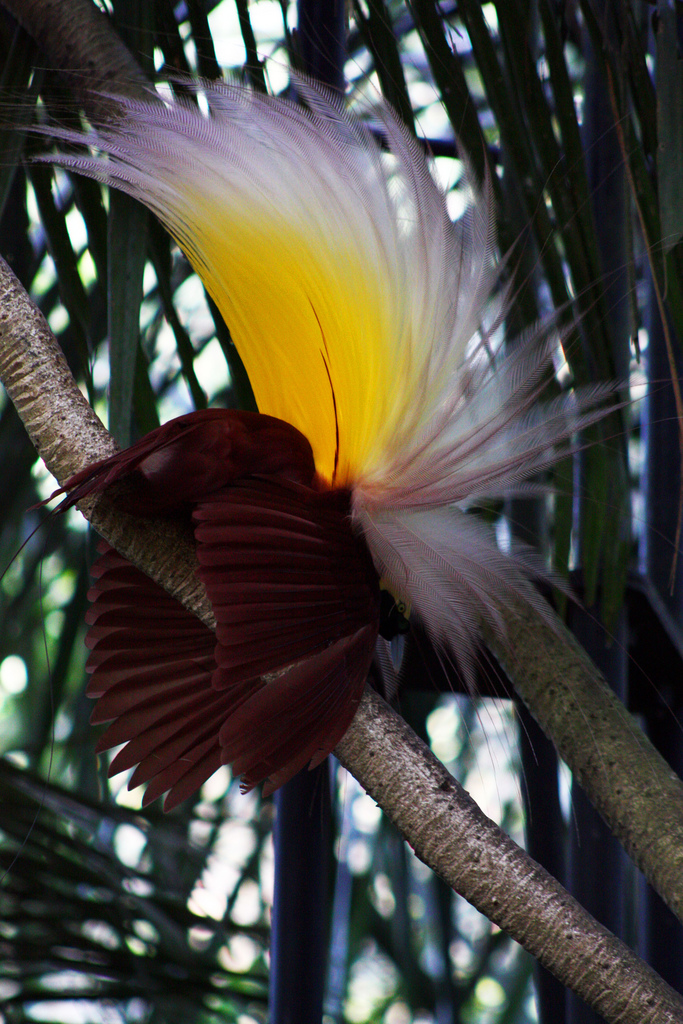
"Hunchback" display pose. The male takes this position with other males in the wild. After a few prolonged seconds of posing in place, the males hop around with their flank feathers cocked and loudly calling, then pausing again.

Males display in trees above the ground and congregate in a lek or "court" versus individually displaying for females. Males will initially congregate around common display areas on a secondary perch, away from the main viewing perches available, and flap their wings rapidly. They will then move to the main viewing perches, erecting their large plumes at their rumps over their backs and extending their wings (Pose 1). They subsequently depress their bodies close to the branches that they are on, retract their wings, leave their tail plumes erected, and prance or charge along their branch (Pose 2). The birds will then freeze with their bills pointed downwards, wings extended once again, and tail plumes still upright (Pose 3). Males will assume this last position, referred to as the "flower position" when females are present, for inspection purposes, but will refrain and remain in position two, moving in synchrony, when females are absent.

Males will often visit each other's display grounds, located relatively close to each other, but will perform the majority of their displays at a common court. Other courtship behaviors outside of the physical dance can consist of bill-wiping, in which the male pauses the dance and brushes both sides of his beak on the branch, as well as leaf-tearing, hanging upside down from the branch, and vocalizations.

==== Calls ====
Males use eight variations of calls, commonly referred to as "wauks" within courtship rituals, each linked to a section of the courtship dance:

- Rising call: A series of four or five "wauks" repeated at one-second intervals. The first two notes are of approximately equal volume and the subsequent two or three are of increasing volume and intensity.
- Rapid wauk call: A series of quick "wauks", all of the equal volume, delivered in bursts of several per second, accompanied by wingbeats. These calls are usually performed when a female is in the vicinity and in correlation with pose one.
- Wing pose call: The only non-"wauk" call, this vocalization consists of piercing "ee-ak" notes repeated multiple times. This call is accompanied by the posing of the wings (pose 1) and alternates with the rapid wauk call.
- Pump call: A much faster version of the rapid wauk call, to the point where the sound of the call meshes into a single sound of "wa-wa-wa". These calls last up to ten seconds.
- Baa call: Following the pump call, males will perform several nasal "baa" notes combined with movement into pose three.
- Nasal call: A more sudden and nasally version of the baa call is given after the male leaves the primary viewing branch around the court.
- Chugich call: Can be performed prior to the click call or after the nasal call; consists of a guttural "chug'ich" note.

Daily display rhythm

Males spend the majority of their time during mating seasons at their respective display grounds. They begin calling before sunrise and cease shortly after sunset. They feed very briefly and infrequently, moving away from display grounds in the heat of the afternoon, and returning before dusk. This mating behavior most commonly occurs between March and May, and again August through December, but can occur during other parts of the year as well.

== Status ==
A common species throughout its native range, the greater bird-of-paradise is evaluated as Least Concern on the IUCN Red List of Threatened Species. It is listed in Appendix II of CITES.
