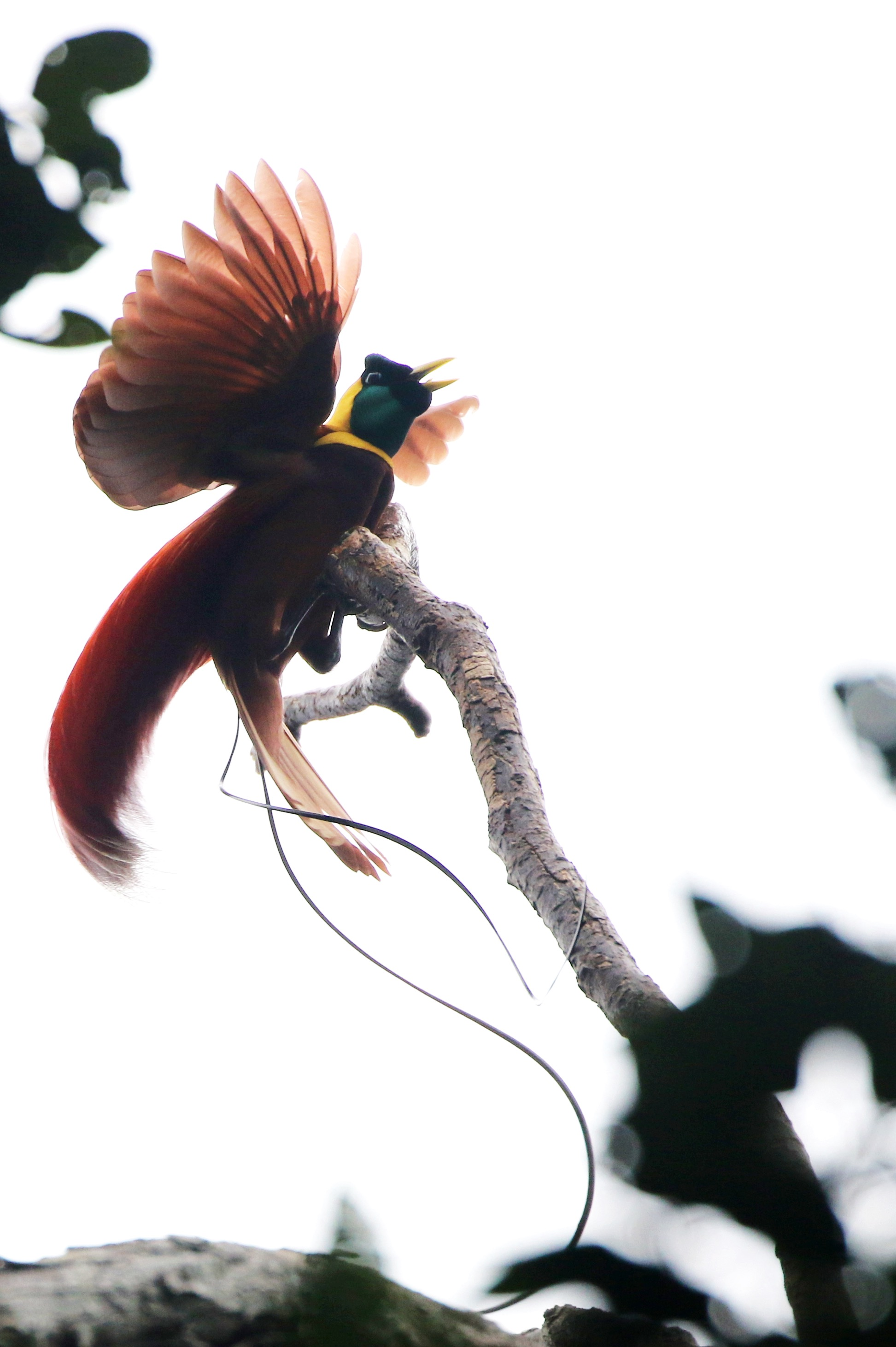
- Wild male in full display from West Papua on Waigeo Island
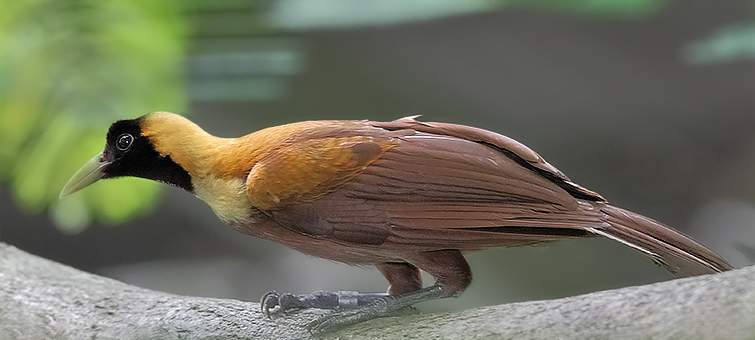
- Female (at Jurong BirdPark, Singapore)

Conservation status
- Near Threatened (IUCN 3.1)

Scientific classification
- Kingdom: Animalia
- Phylum: Chordata
- Class: Aves
- Order: Passeriformes
- Family: Paradisaeidae
- Genus: Paradisaea
- Species: P. rubra

Binomial name
- Paradisaea rubra Daudin, 1800

= Red bird-of-paradise =

Species of bird

The red bird-of-paradise (Paradisaea rubra), also called the cendrawasih merah, is a bird-of-paradise in the genus Paradisaea, family Paradisaeidae.

== Description ==
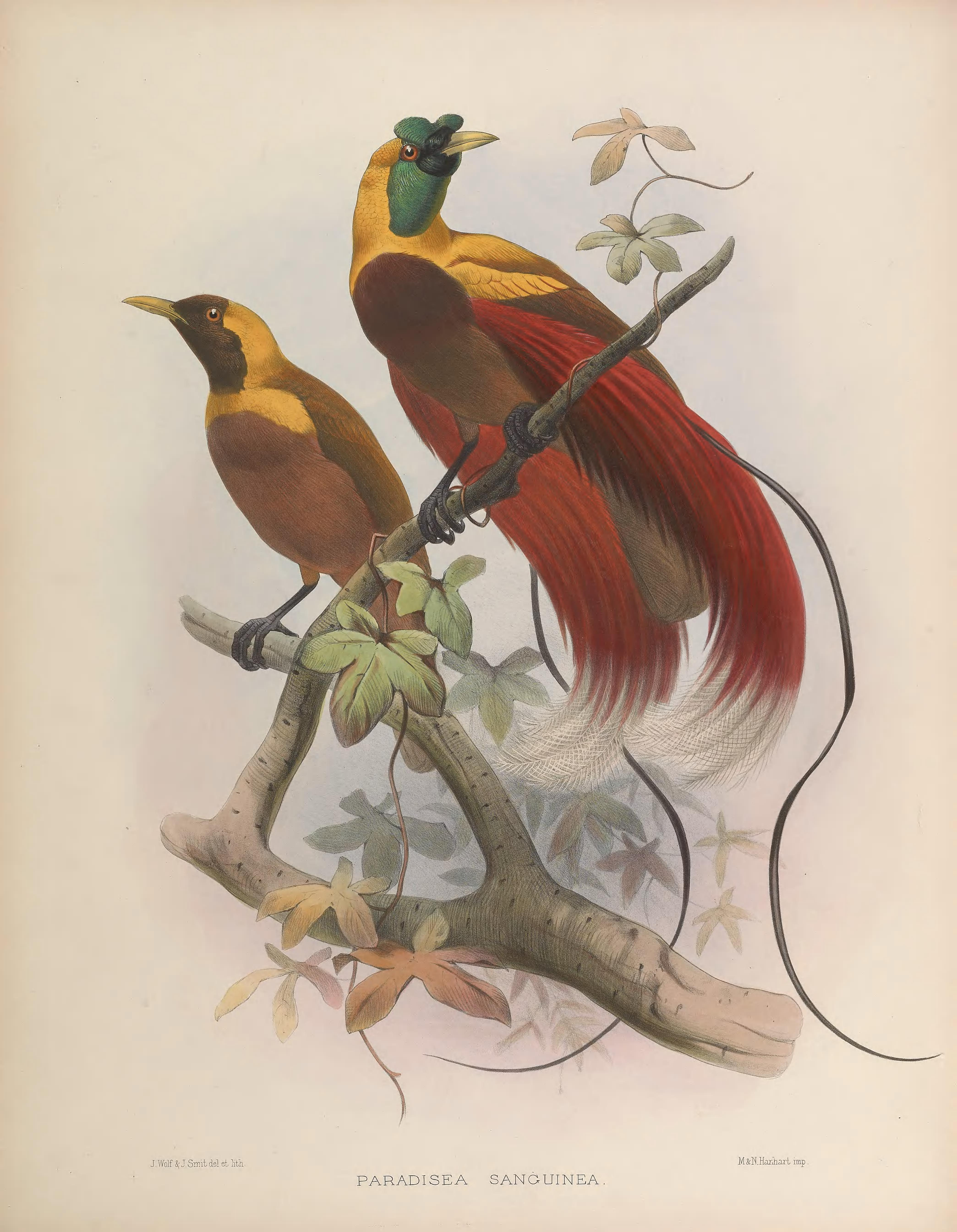
Illustration of male and female.

Large, up to 33 cm long, brown and yellow with a dark brown iris, grey legs, and yellow bill. The male has an emerald green face, a pair of elongated black corkscrew-shaped tail wires, dark green feather pompoms above each eye, and a train of glossy crimson red plumes with whitish tips at either side of the breast. The male measures up to 72 cm long, including the ornamental red plumes that require at least six years to fully attain. The female is similar but smaller in size, with a dark brown face and has no ornamental red plumes. The diet consists mainly of fruits, berries and arthropods.

== Distribution ==
An Indonesian endemic, the red bird-of-paradise is distributed to lowland rainforests of Waigeo and Batanta islands of Raja Ampat, West Papua. This species shares its home with another bird-of-paradise, the Wilson's bird-of-paradise. Hybridisation between these two species has not been recorded.

== In popular culture ==
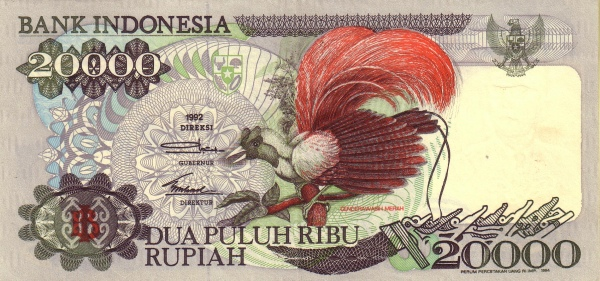
Red bird-of-paradise featured in 20,000-rupiah banknote.

- The red bird-of-paradise is depicted on the front side of 1992 edition of Indonesia 20000 Rupiah banknote.

== Gallery ==
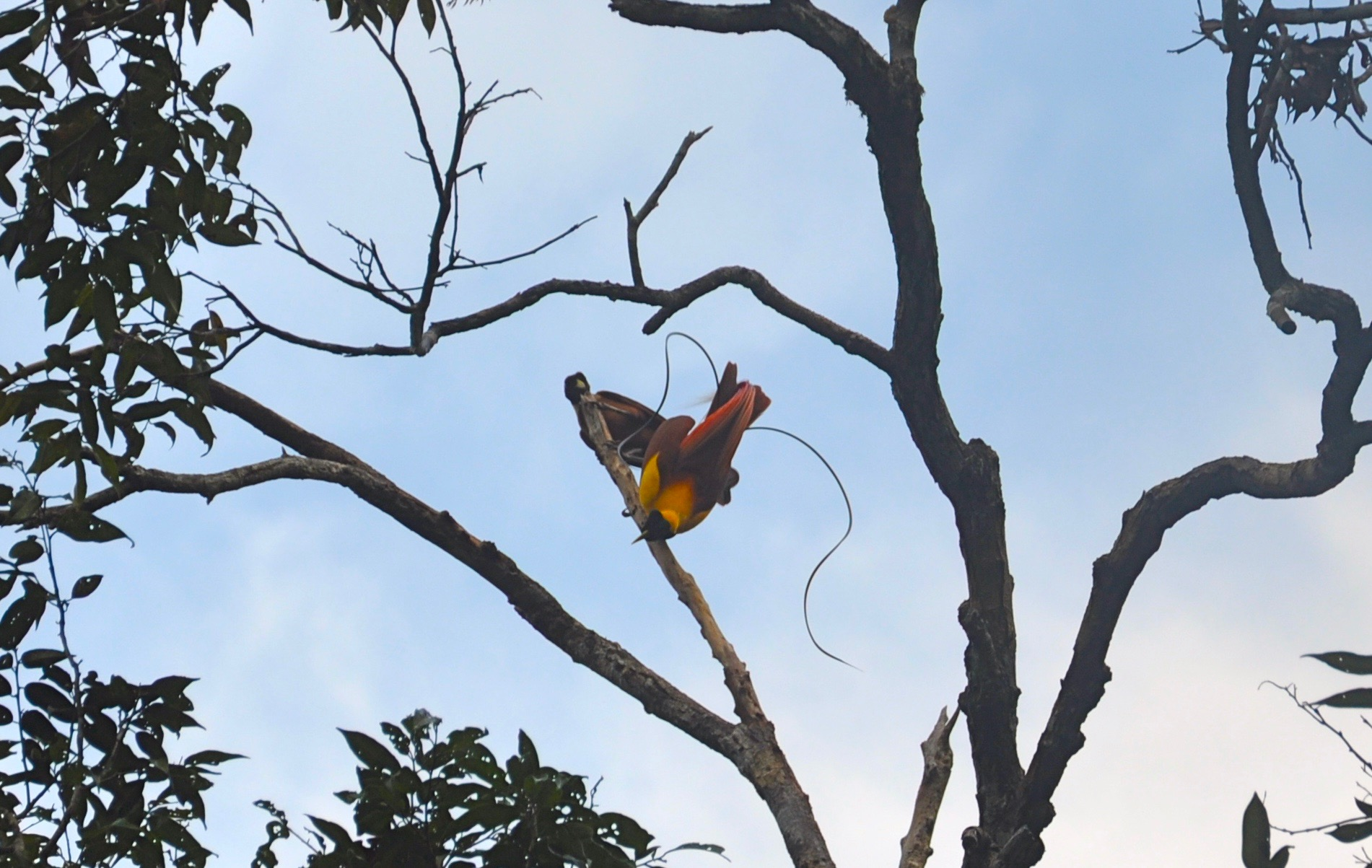
Red bird-of-paradise on Tree in Raja Ampat Papua, 2015

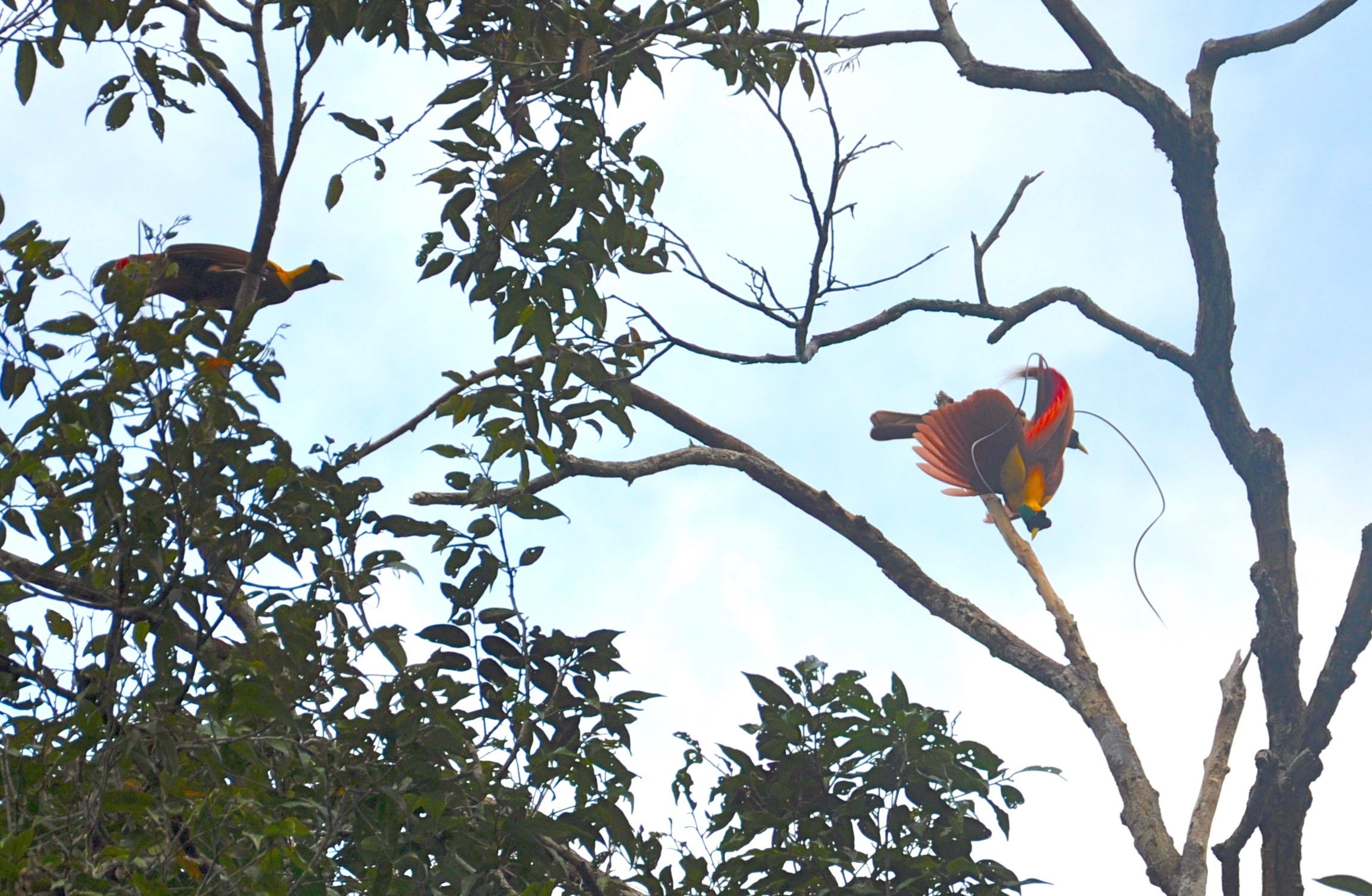
Red bird-of-paradise on Tree in Raja Ampat Papua, 2015

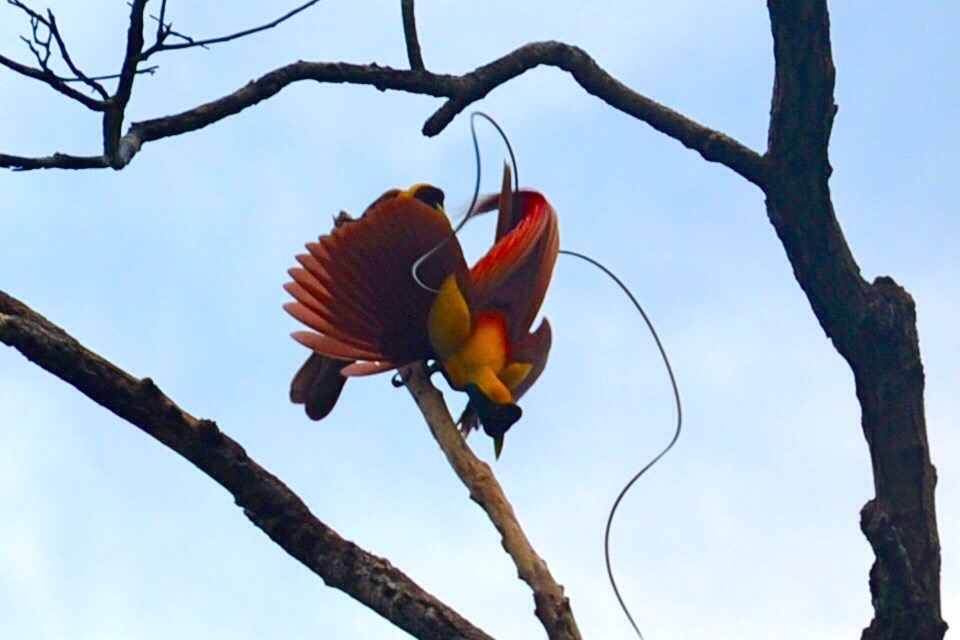
Red bird-of-paradise on Tree in Raja Ampat Papua, 2015

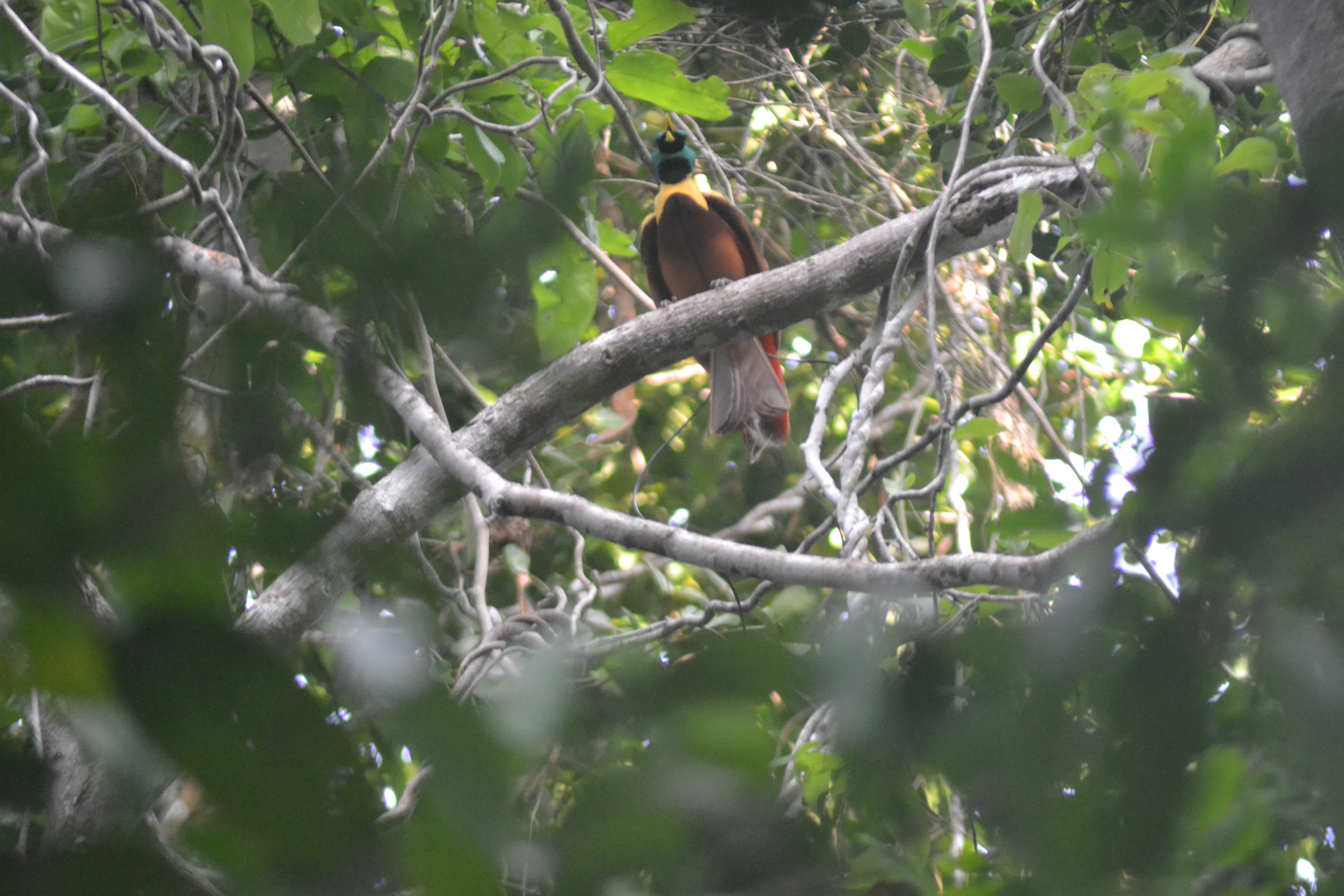
Red bird-of-paradise on Tree in Papua New Guinea, 2013

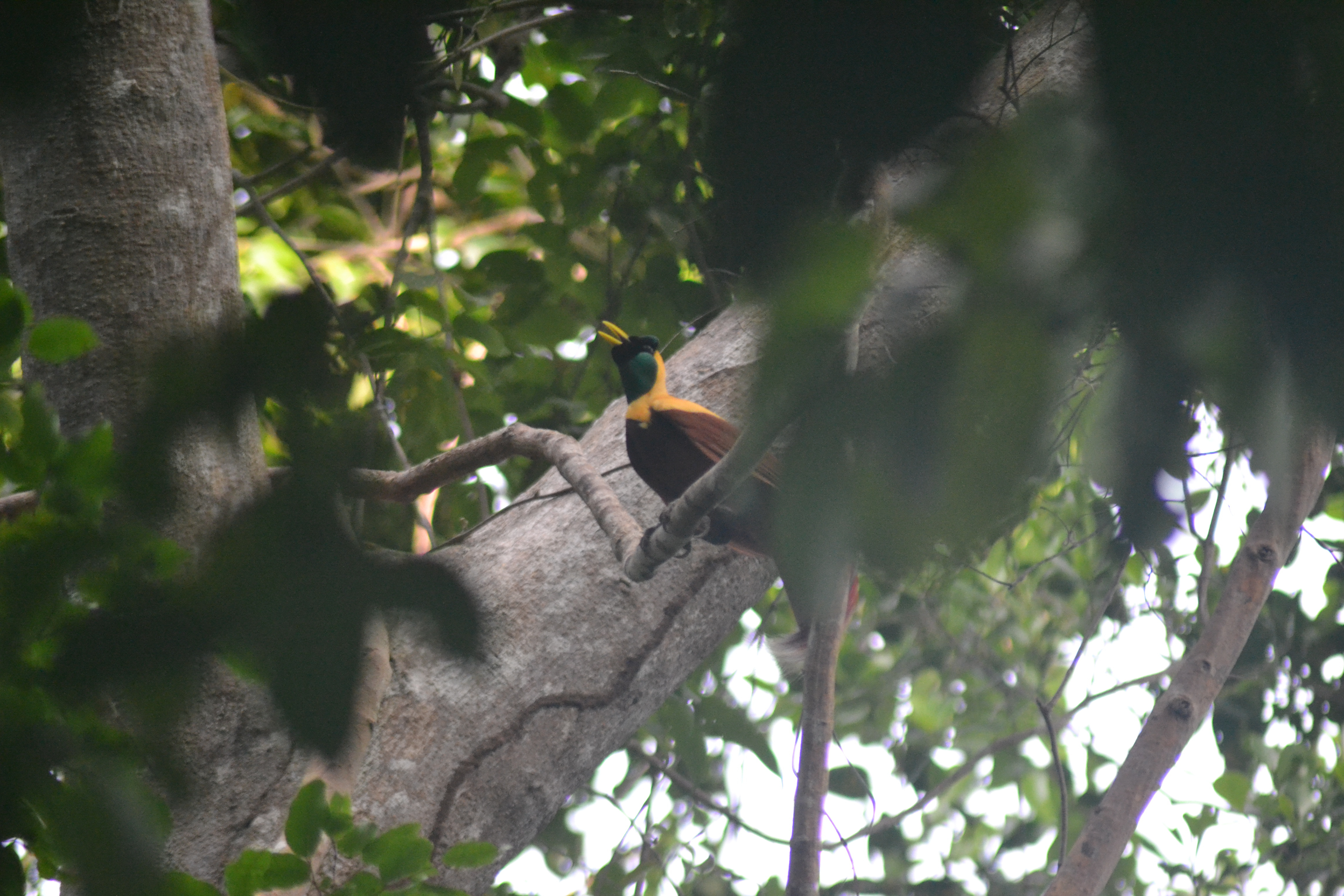
Red bird-of-paradise on Tree in Papua New Guinea, 2013

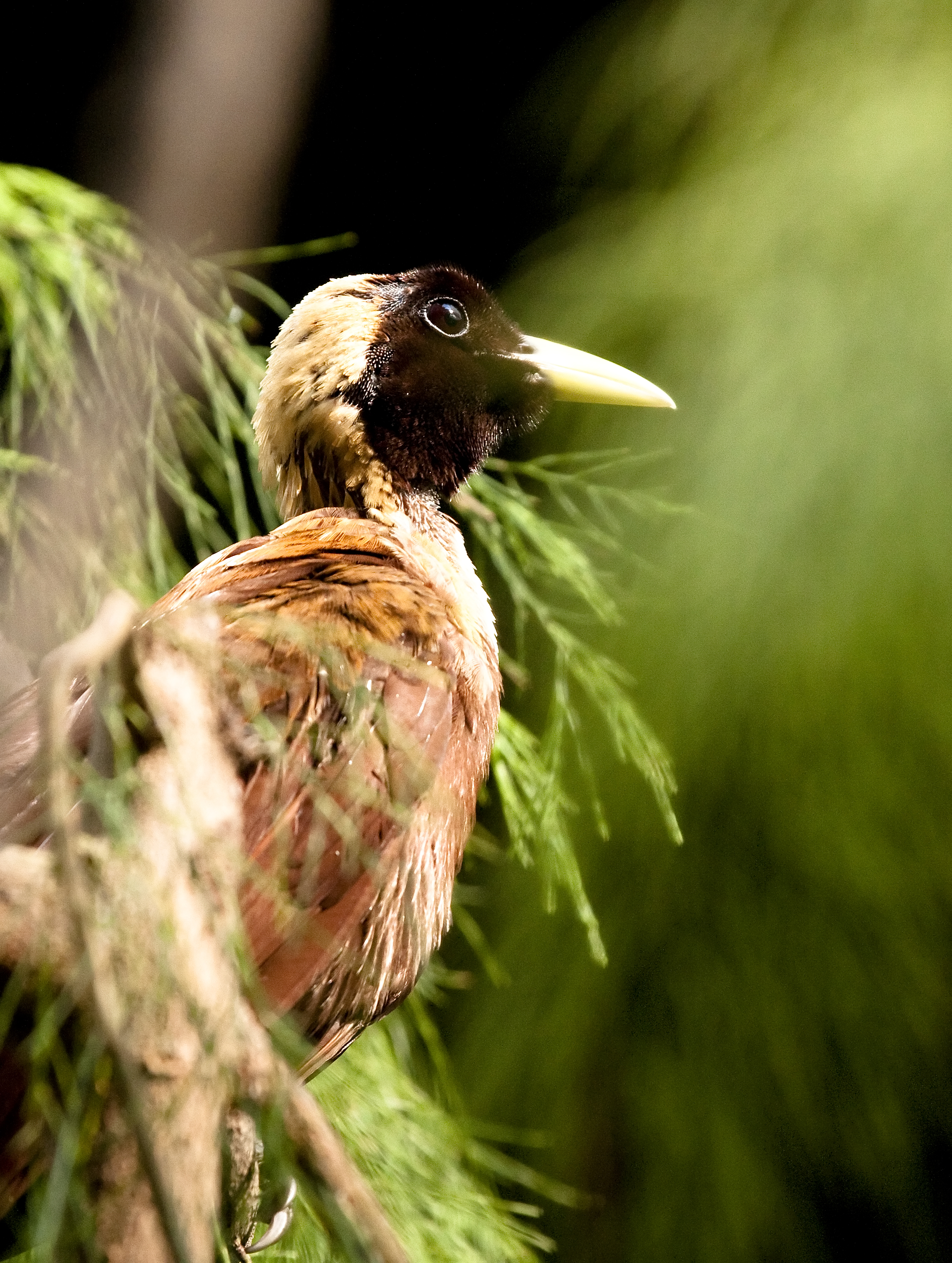
Juvenile Red bird-of-paradise, 2009
