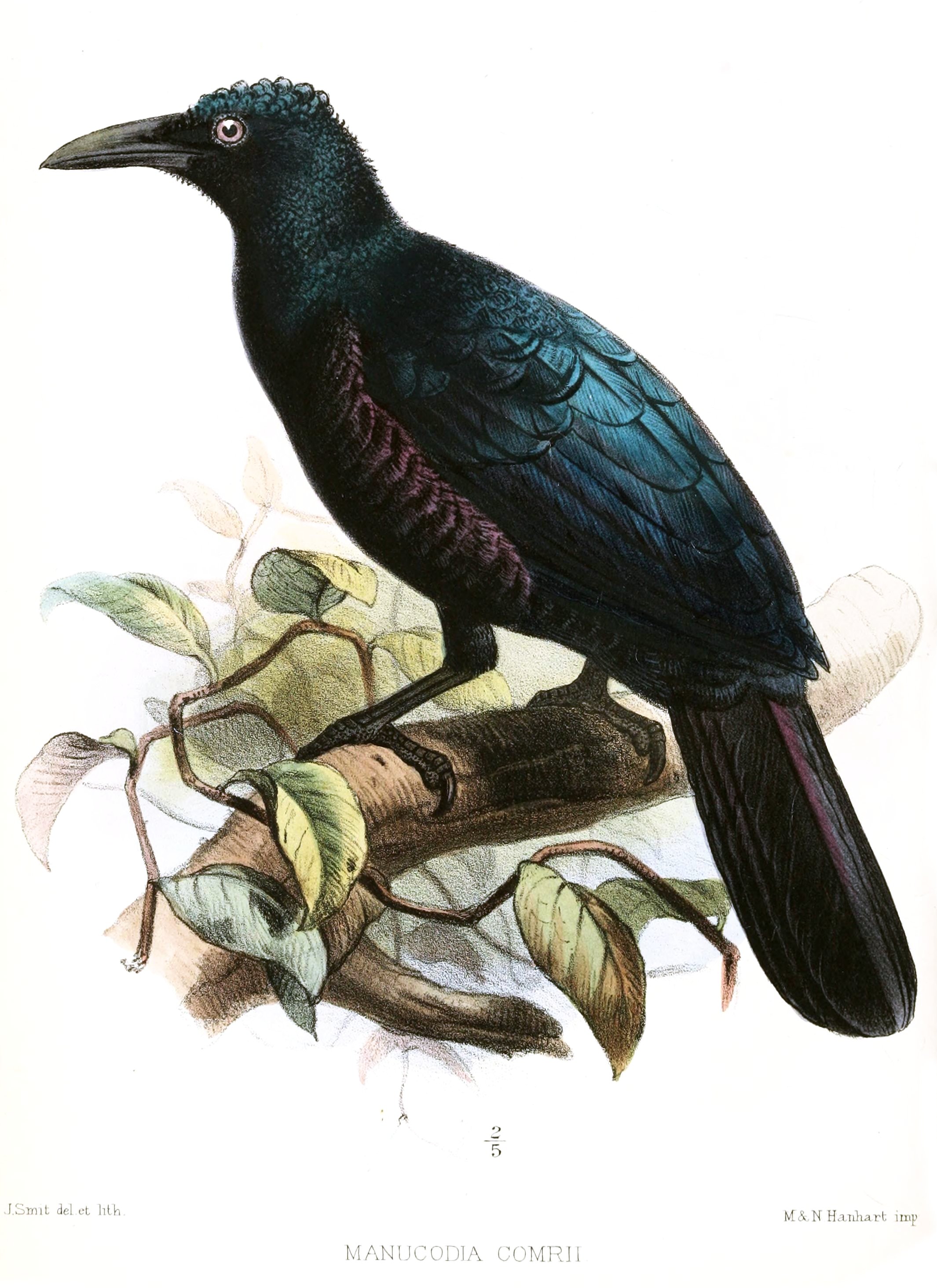
- Curl-crested manucode, (Manucodia comrii)

Scientific classification
- Kingdom: Animalia
- Phylum: Chordata
- Class: Aves
- Order: Passeriformes
- Family: Paradisaeidae
- Genus: Manucodia; Boddaert, 1783

Type species
- Manucodia chalybea Boddaert, 1783

= Manucode =

Genus of birds

Manucodes are birds-of-paradise in the genus Manucodia. The genus was introduced by the Dutch naturalist Pieter Boddaert in 1783 for the crinkle-collared manucode (Manucodia chalybatus), which is now the type species. The genus name is a contracted form of Manucodiata, used in 1760 by the French zoologist Mathurin Jacques Brisson for a group of birds-of-paradise. This word is a Latin derivation of the Malay terms manuk ("bird") and dewata ("of the gods" or "godly").

The members of this genus are medium-sized perching birds with black-glossed purple and green plumage, which inhabit the lowland forests of New Guinea and nearby islands. They are monogamous and sexually monomorphic, in contrast to other birds-of-paradise.

The genus contains four species.

Image	Common name	Scientific name	Distribution
	Glossy-mantled manucode	Manucodia ater	lowlands of New Guinea and nearby islands
	Jobi manucode	Manucodia jobiensis	lowland forests of Jobi Island and northern New Guinea
	Crinkle-collared manucode	Manucodia chalybatus	New Guinea and Misool Island of West Papua.
	Curl-crested manucode	Manucodia comrii	Papua New Guinea.
