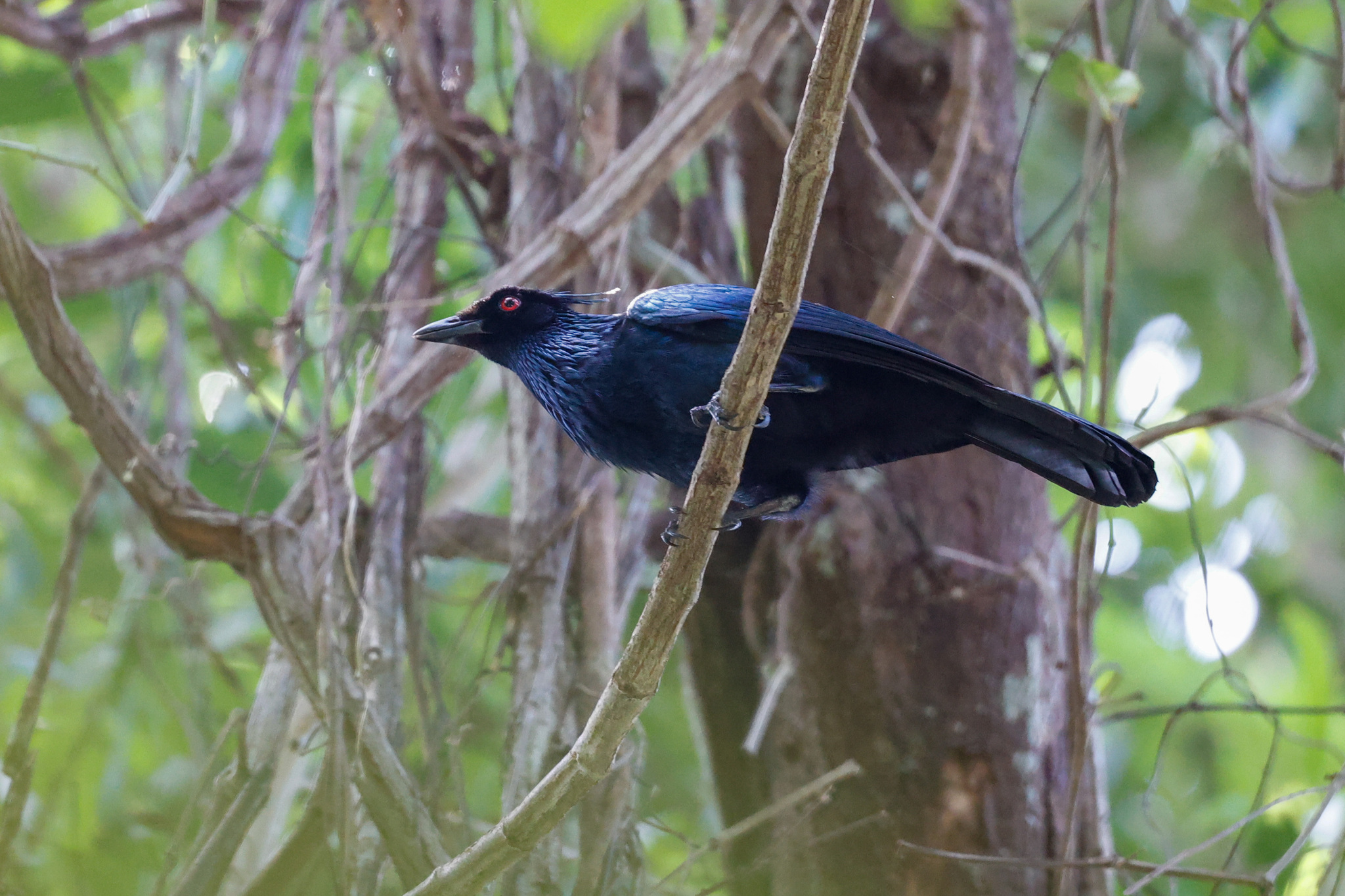
- Trumpet manucode in Kutini-Payamu (Iron Range) National Park, Queensland

Conservation status
- Least Concern (IUCN 3.1)

Scientific classification
- Kingdom: Animalia
- Phylum: Chordata
- Class: Aves
- Order: Passeriformes
- Family: Paradisaeidae
- Genus: Phonygammus; Lesson & Garnot, 1826
- Species: P. keraudrenii

Binomial name
- Phonygammus keraudrenii (Lesson & Garnot, 1826)
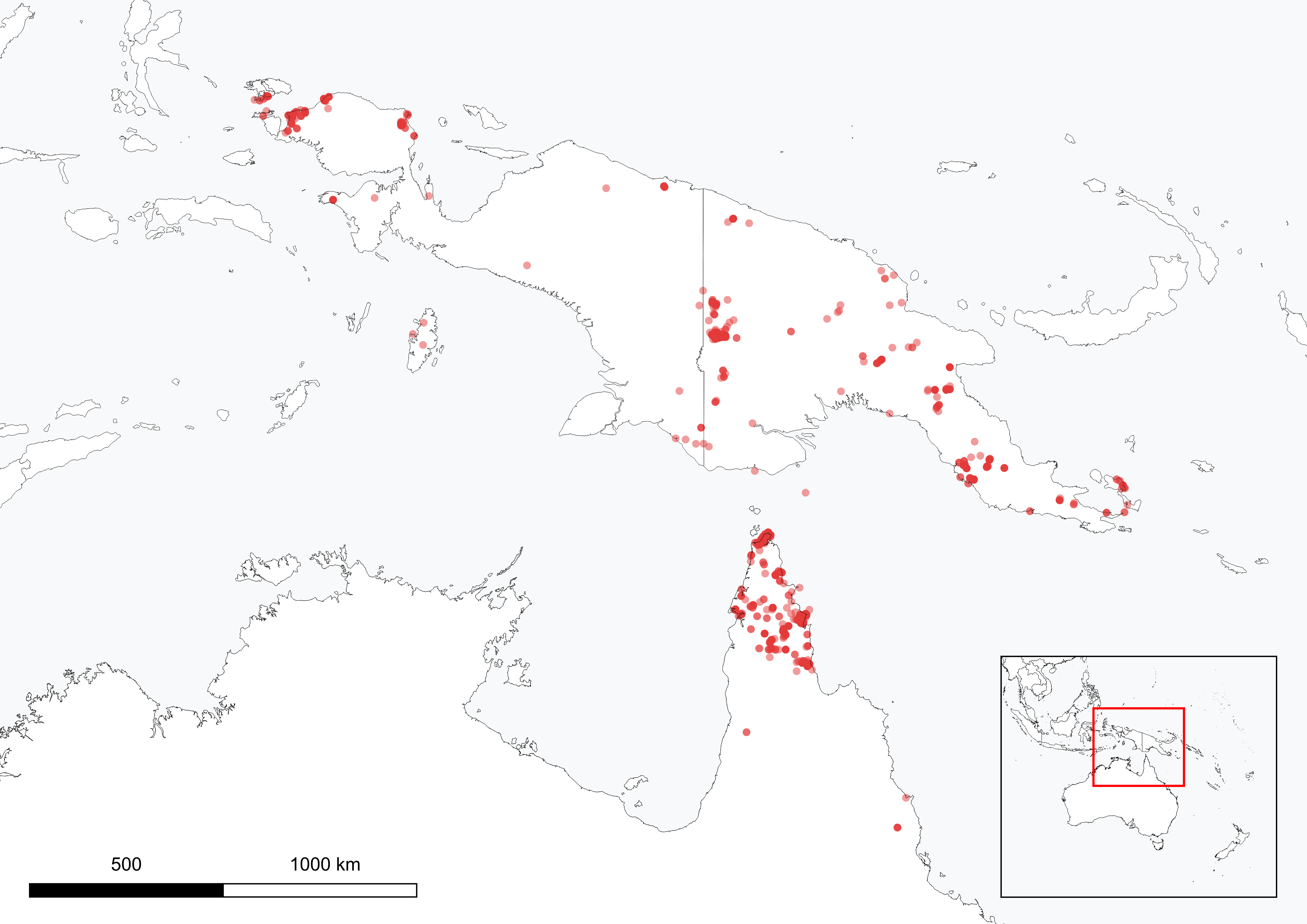
- Species distribution

Synonyms
- Manucodia keraudrenii Phonygama purpureoviolacea

= Trumpet manucode =

Species of bird

The trumpet manucode (Phonygammus keraudrenii) is a species of bird in the family Paradisaeidae.

The trumpet manucode is named after its powerful and loud trumpeting calls. The specific name, keraudrenii, commemorates French Navy physician Pierre François Keraudren (1769–1858).

The trumpet manucode is widely distributed throughout lowland rainforests of New Guinea, northern Cape York Peninsula, the Aru Islands, and the D'Entrecasteaux Islands, though certain subspecies are geographically distinct. This species is monogamous.

Widespread and common throughout its large habitat range, the trumpet manucode is evaluated as Least Concern on the IUCN Red List of Threatened Species. It is listed on Appendix II of CITES.

== Description ==
The trumpet manucode is approximately 31 cm (12 in) long. It has elongated horn-like head tufts and loose neck feathers. The plumage is of an iridescent blackish glossed blue, green and purple. It has a red iris, long coiled trachea, and blackish bill, mouth and legs. The female resembles the male, but is smaller in size and duller in color.

Some of the subspecies vary slightly among themselves, most notably in size and iridescence color.

== Diet ==
The diet consists mainly of fruits and arthropods.

== Subspecies ==
- Phonygammus keraudrenii adelberti
- Phonygammus keraudrenii aruensis
- Phonygammus keraudrenii diamondi
- Phonygammus keraudrenii gouldii
- Phonygammus keraudrenii hunsteini
- Phonygammus keraudrenii jamesi
- Phonygammus keraudrenii keraudrenii
- Phonygammus keraudrenii mayri
- Phonygammus keraudrenii neumanni
- Phonygammus keraudrenii purpureoviolacea

== Gallery ==
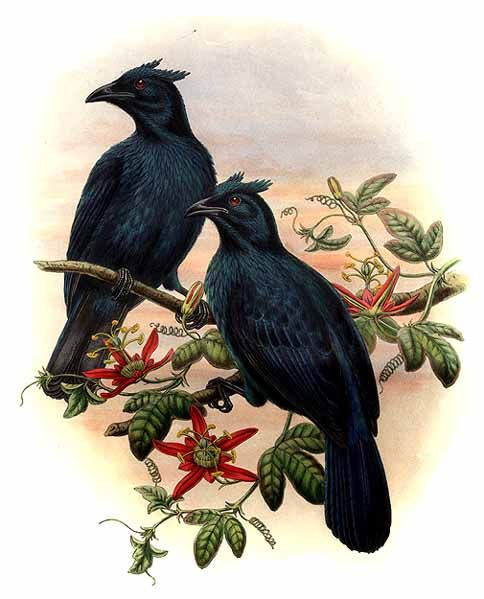
Manucodia keraudrenii by Bowdler Sharpe

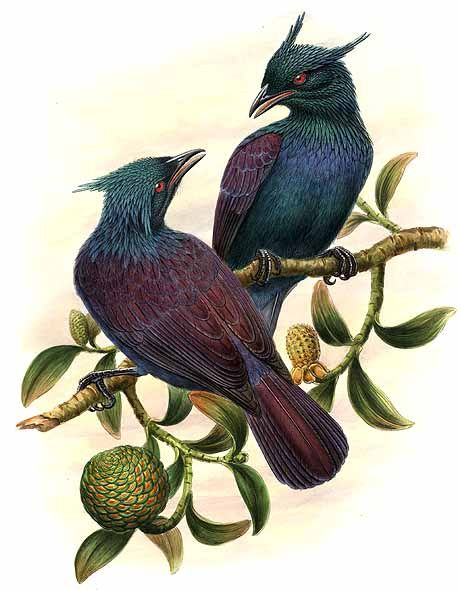
Manucodia keraudrenii by Bowdler Sharpe
