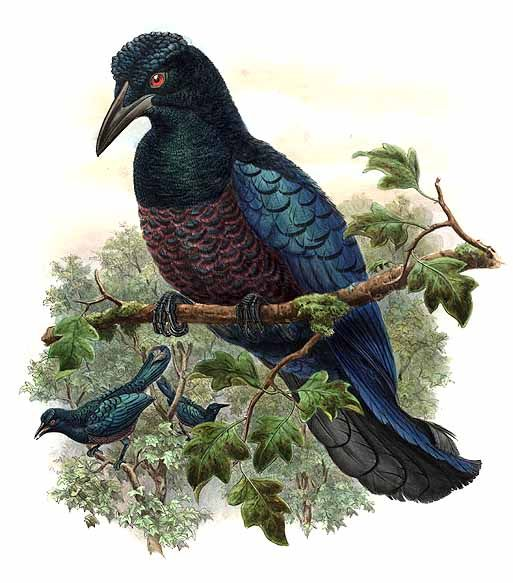
- Illustration of Manucodia comrii
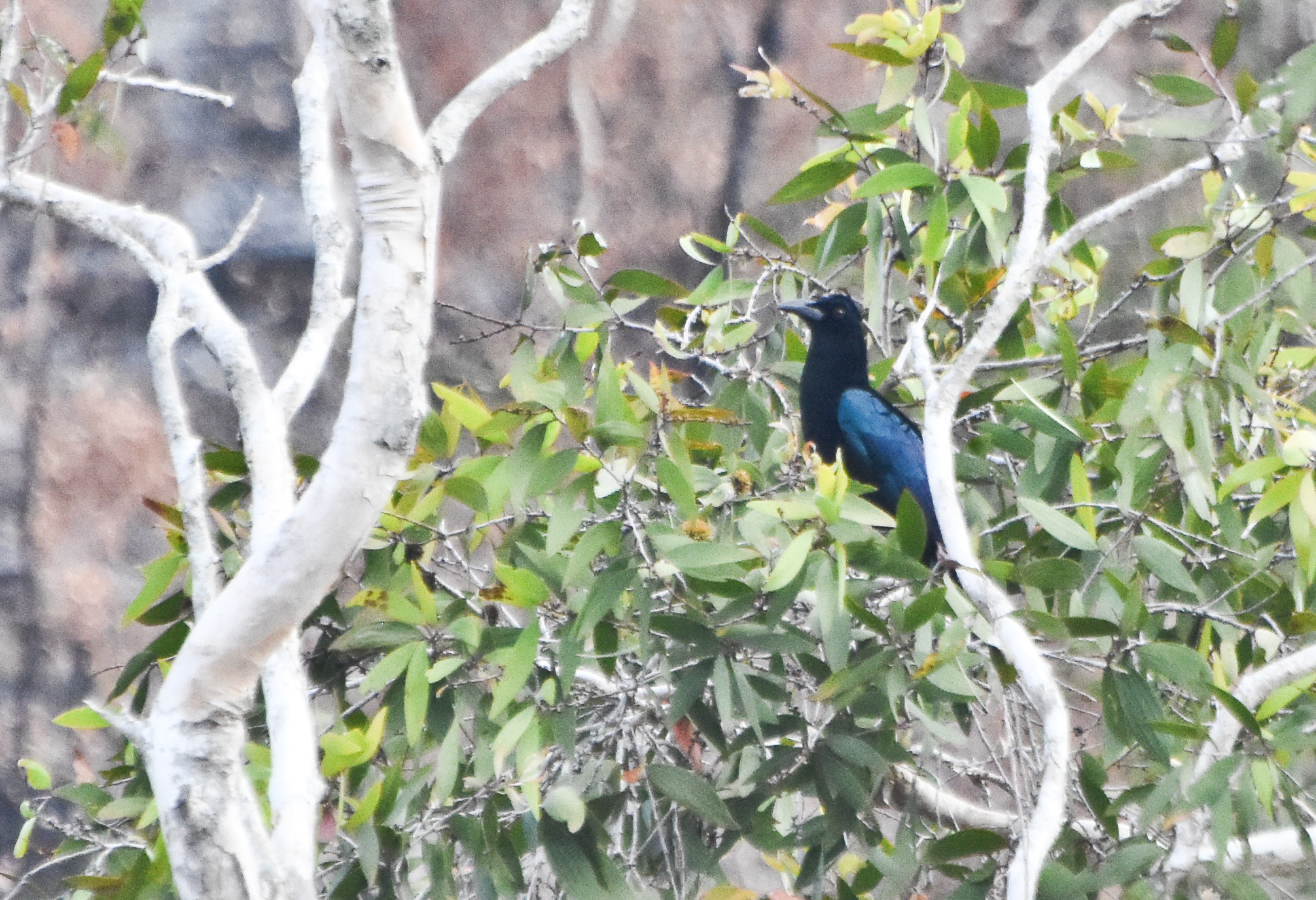

Conservation status
- Least Concern (IUCN 3.1)

Scientific classification
- Kingdom: Animalia
- Phylum: Chordata
- Class: Aves
- Order: Passeriformes
- Family: Paradisaeidae
- Genus: Manucodia
- Species: M. comrii

Binomial name
- Manucodia comrii Sclater, PL, 1876

= Curl-crested manucode =

Species of bird

The curl-crested manucode (Manucodia comrii) is a species of bird-of-paradise.

== Etymology ==
The British zoologist Philip Lutley Sclater named this species after Dr. Peter Comrie (1832-1882), who discovered the bird on Fergusson Island in 1874.

== Subspecies ==
- Manucodia comrii comrii P. L. Sclater, 1876 — D'Entrecasteaux Islands
- Manucodia comrii trobriandi Mayr, 1936 — Trobriand Islands (Kiriwina and Kaileuna)

== Distribution ==
Endemic to Papua New Guinea, the curl-crested manucode is distributed to the Trobriand Islands and islands of the D'Entrecasteaux Archipelago.

A common species in its limited habitat range, the curl-crested manucode is evaluated as Least Concern on the IUCN Red List of Threatened Species. It is listed on Appendix II of CITES.

== Habitat ==
These birds mainly live in the upper montane rainforest, forest edges and woodland, but also in the wooded savannah, in parks and gardens.

== Description ==
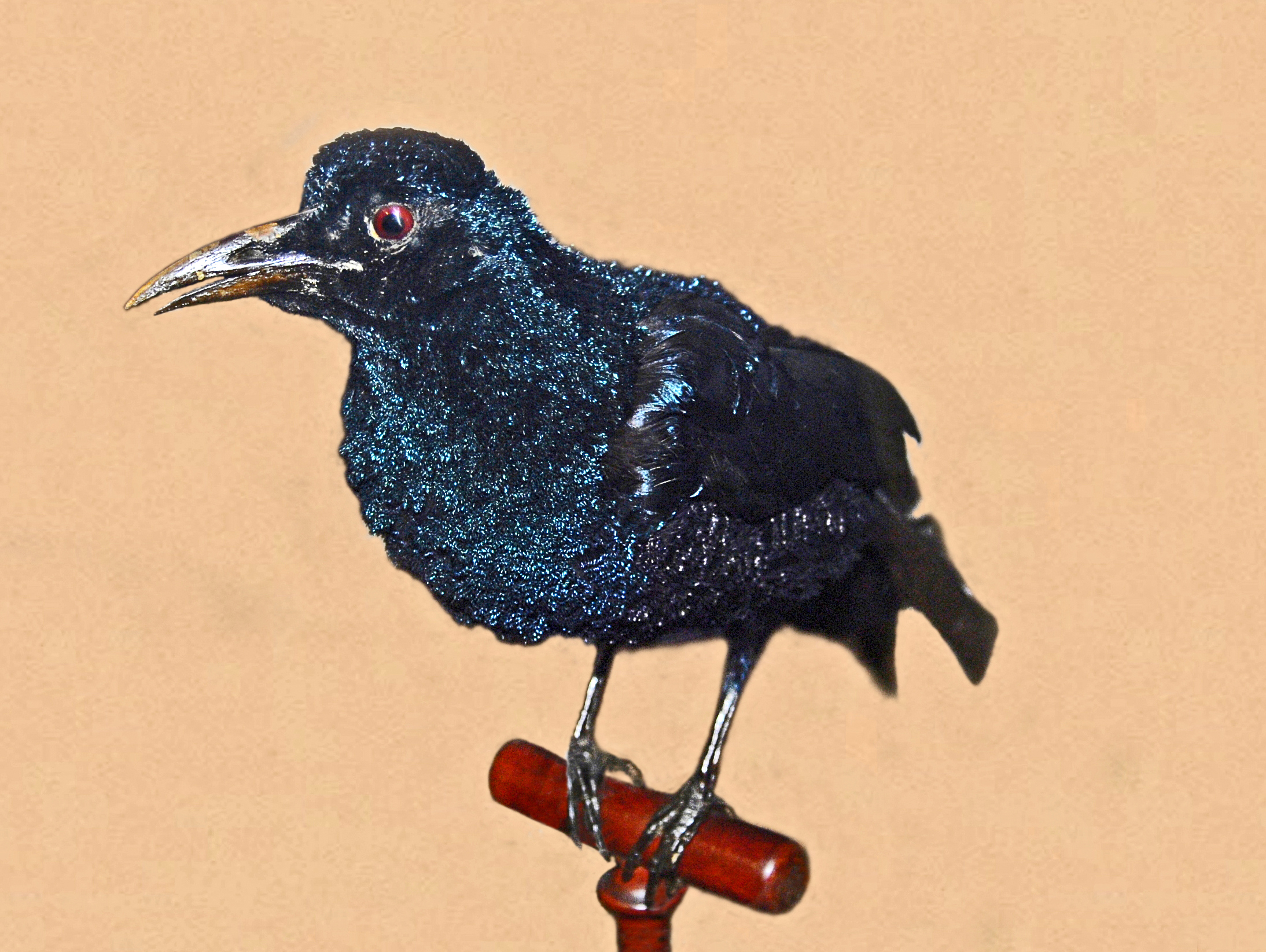
Museum specimen

Manucodia comrii has a compact and large body approximately 43 cm long, with glossy purple, black and green plumage, red iris and crinkled yellowish-green upper breast and neck feathers. It has curled head feathering and twisted central tail feathers. Both sexes are similar with a slightly smaller female.

The curl-crested manucode is the largest species of manucode, and also the largest and heaviest species in its family in terms of body size, weighing up to 450 grams though its tail is shorter than the black sicklebill.

== Biology ==
Although not the most vibrant in appearance, the curl-crest manucode is certainly a vocally evolved species. In most birds, the trachea extends straight from the mouth to the lungs, whereas in this species, it extends towards the lower chest area and coils back through the abdominal cavity and then reaches the lungs, which works like a wind instrument and gives the curl-crested manucode a characteristic mellow, fluting sound which is audible from a considerable distance. These vocalizations are common in courtship displays, where the males follow insistently the females among the vegetation spreading their wings and tail and raising their bodies in a strutting fashion. Manucode pairs also vocalize to defend their territories from invading pairs.

These birds have diurnal habits. The diet of Manucodia comrii consists mainly of ripe fruits, feeding mostly on figs, but also on insects and other small invertebrates. They usually live in pairs or in small groups in a single territory.

Breeding season last from June to November, nest-building has been recorded in mid-November and egg-laying occurs in March and in June–October. Manucodia comrii is a strictly monogamous bird. The couple collaborates in building of a cup-shaped nest on a bifurcation of a branch. Once 1-2 eggs are laid, both sexes hatch the eggs and raise their chicks.
