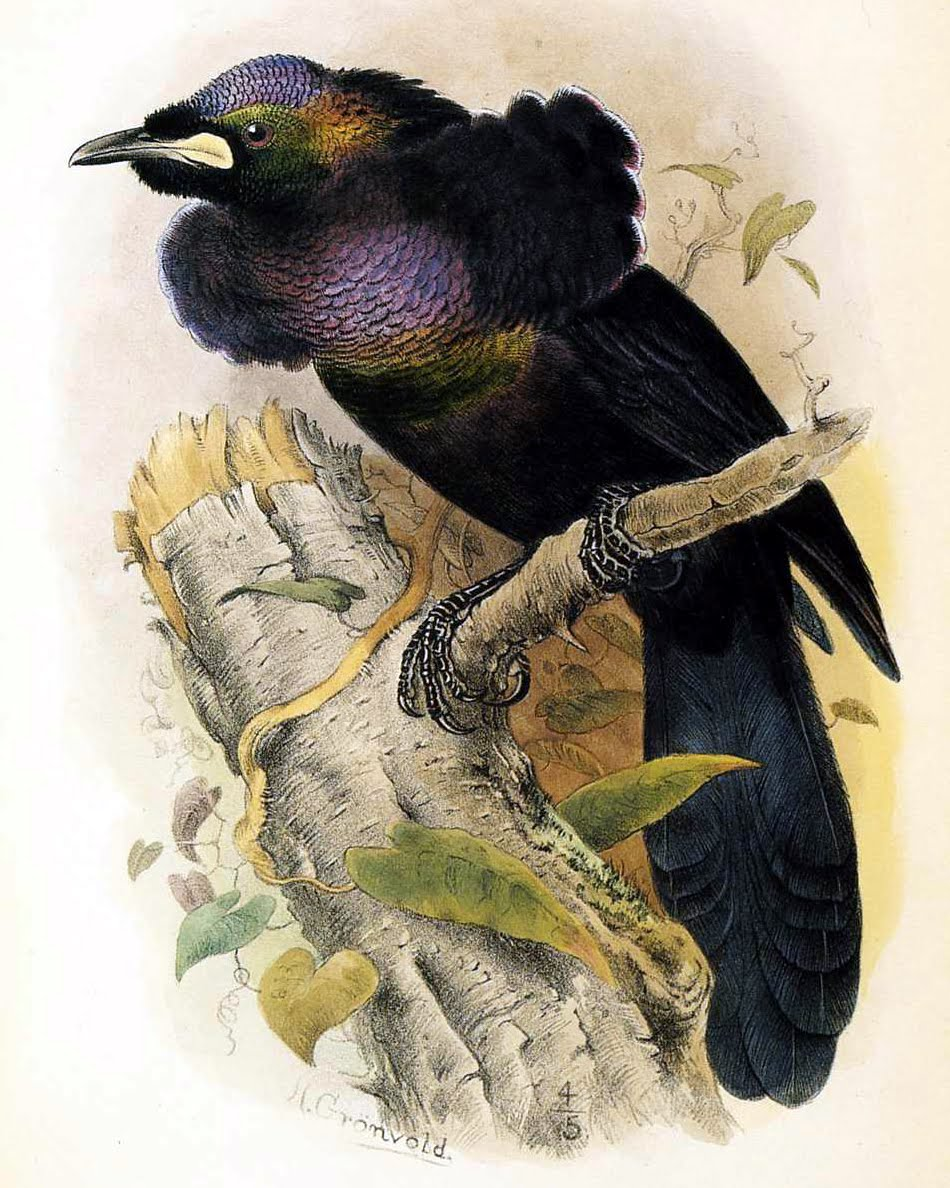

Scientific classification
- Kingdom: Animalia
- Phylum: Chordata
- Class: Aves
- Order: Passeriformes
- Superfamily: Corvoidea
- Family: Paradisaeidae
- Hybrid: Paradigalla carunculata × Lophorina superba

Synonyms
- Loborhamphus nobilis Rothschild, 1901

= Rothschild's lobe-billed bird-of-paradise =

Hybrid bird

Rothschild's lobe-billed bird-of-paradise (Loborhamphus nobilis), also known as the noble lobe-bill, is one of six enigmatic species of bird-of-paradise collected in Papua New Guinea for zoologist Walter Rothschild, 2nd Baron Rothschild. It is only known from the holotype.

In 1930, it, along with the five other collected species, was considered by Erwin Stresemann to be a hybrid between the long-tailed paradigalla and the superb bird-of-paradise, though doubts have been raised about the parentage. However, a DNA analysis confirmed the hybrid identity.
