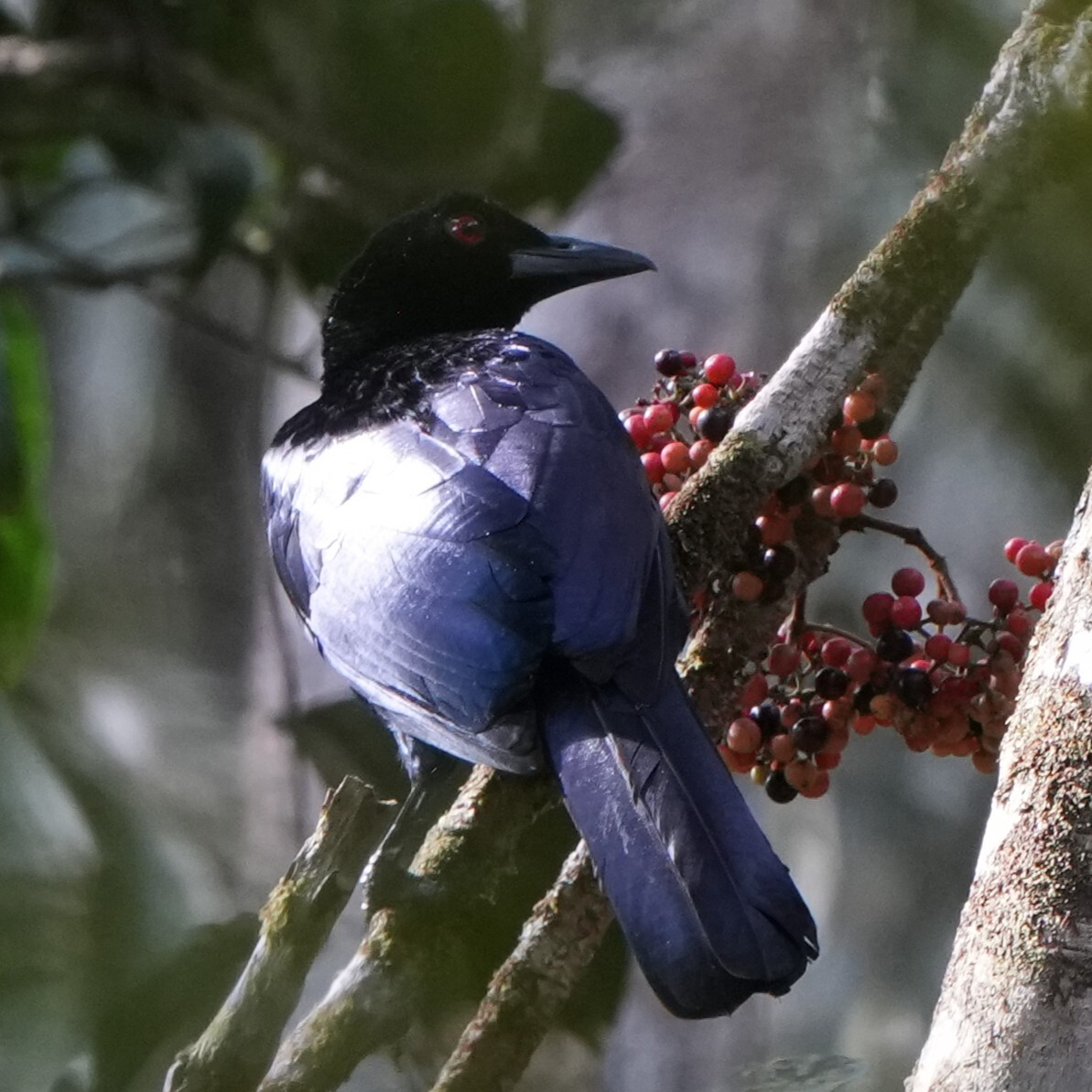

Conservation status
- Least Concern (IUCN 3.1)

Scientific classification
- Kingdom: Animalia
- Phylum: Chordata
- Class: Aves
- Order: Passeriformes
- Family: Paradisaeidae
- Genus: Manucodia
- Species: M. chalybatus

Binomial name
- Manucodia chalybatus (Pennant, 1781)

Synonyms
- Manucodia chalybata

= Crinkle-collared manucode =

Species of bird

The crinkle-collared manucode (Manucodia chalybatus) is a species of bird-of-paradise.

The crinkle-collared manucode is found throughout lowlands and hill forests in mainland New Guinea and Misool Island of West Papua. The diet consists mainly of fruits and figs.

Widespread and a common species throughout its habitat range, the crinkle-collared manucode is evaluated as Least Concern on the IUCN Red List of Threatened Species. It is listed on Appendix II of CITES.

== Description ==
The crinkle-collared manucode is medium-sized, up to 36 cm long, greenish blue, black and purple-glossed with a long graduated tail, red iris and iridescent green breast feathers. Both sexes are similar in appearance, however the female is slightly smaller and less purple. This species resembles the Jobi manucode in appearance, distinguished by its bronzed yellow-green neck feathers.
