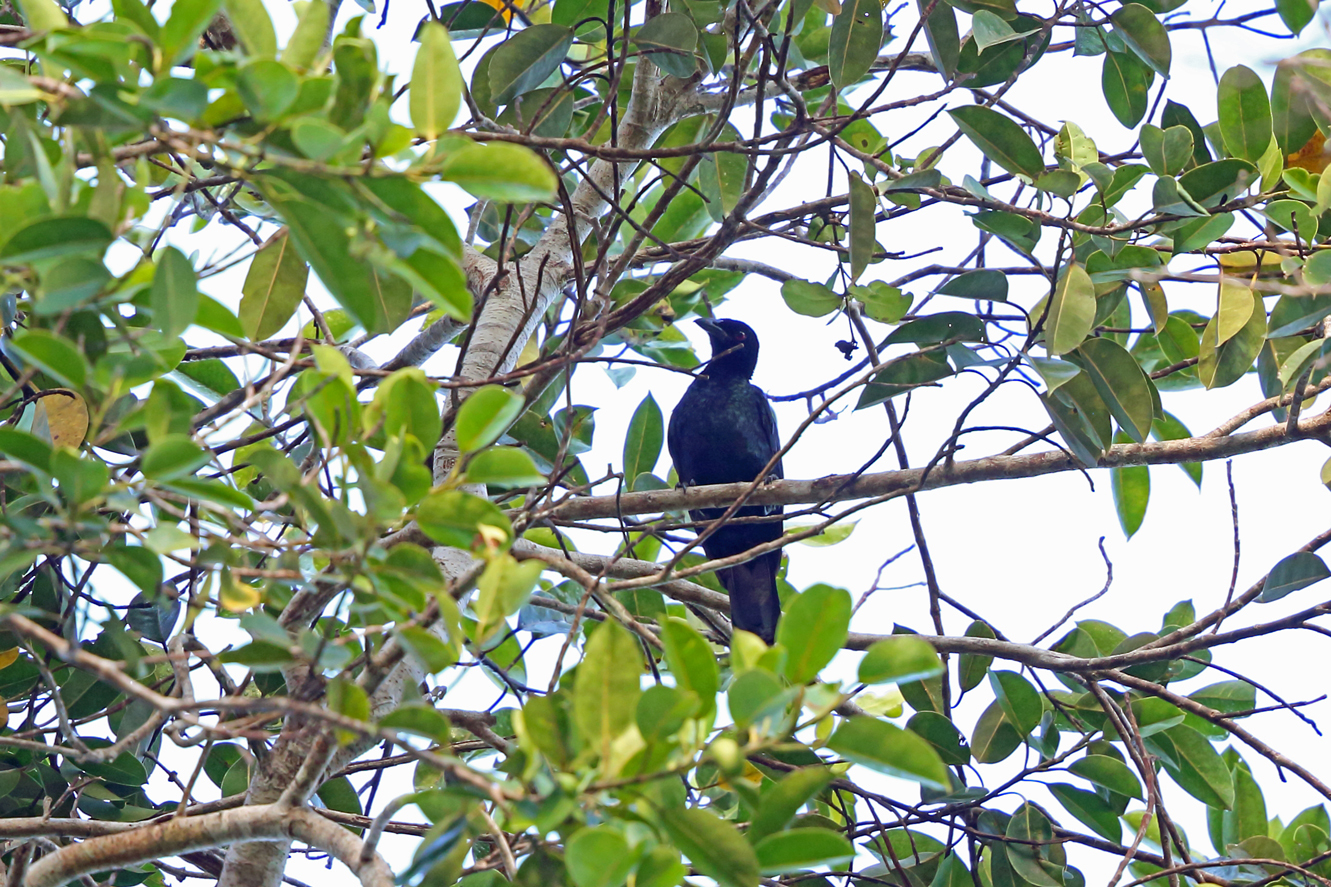

Conservation status
- Least Concern (IUCN 3.1)

Scientific classification
- Kingdom: Animalia
- Phylum: Chordata
- Class: Aves
- Order: Passeriformes
- Family: Paradisaeidae
- Genus: Manucodia
- Species: M. jobiensis

Binomial name
- Manucodia jobiensis Salvadori, 1876

= Jobi manucode =

Species of bird

The Jobi manucode (Manucodia jobiensis) is a species of crow-like bird-of-paradise.

The Jobi manucode is distributed in lowland forests of Jobi Island and northern New Guinea. The diet consists mainly of fruits and arthropods. Like other manucodes, it is monogamous.

One of the most common birds-of-paradise in its range, the Jobi manucode is evaluated as Least Concern on the IUCN Red List of Threatened Species. It is listed on Appendix II of CITES.

== Description ==
The Jobi manucode is medium-sized, up to 34 cm (13 in) long, greenish blue, black and purple-glossed with red iris, lightly crinkled bluish short upper breast and neck feathers. Both sexes are similar in appearance, however the female is slightly smaller and duller. This species resembles the crinkle-collared manucode in appearance, distinguished by its neck feathers and by having a shorter tail than the latter species.

== Subspecies ==
- Manucodia jobiensis jobiensis
- Manucodia jobiensis rubiensis
