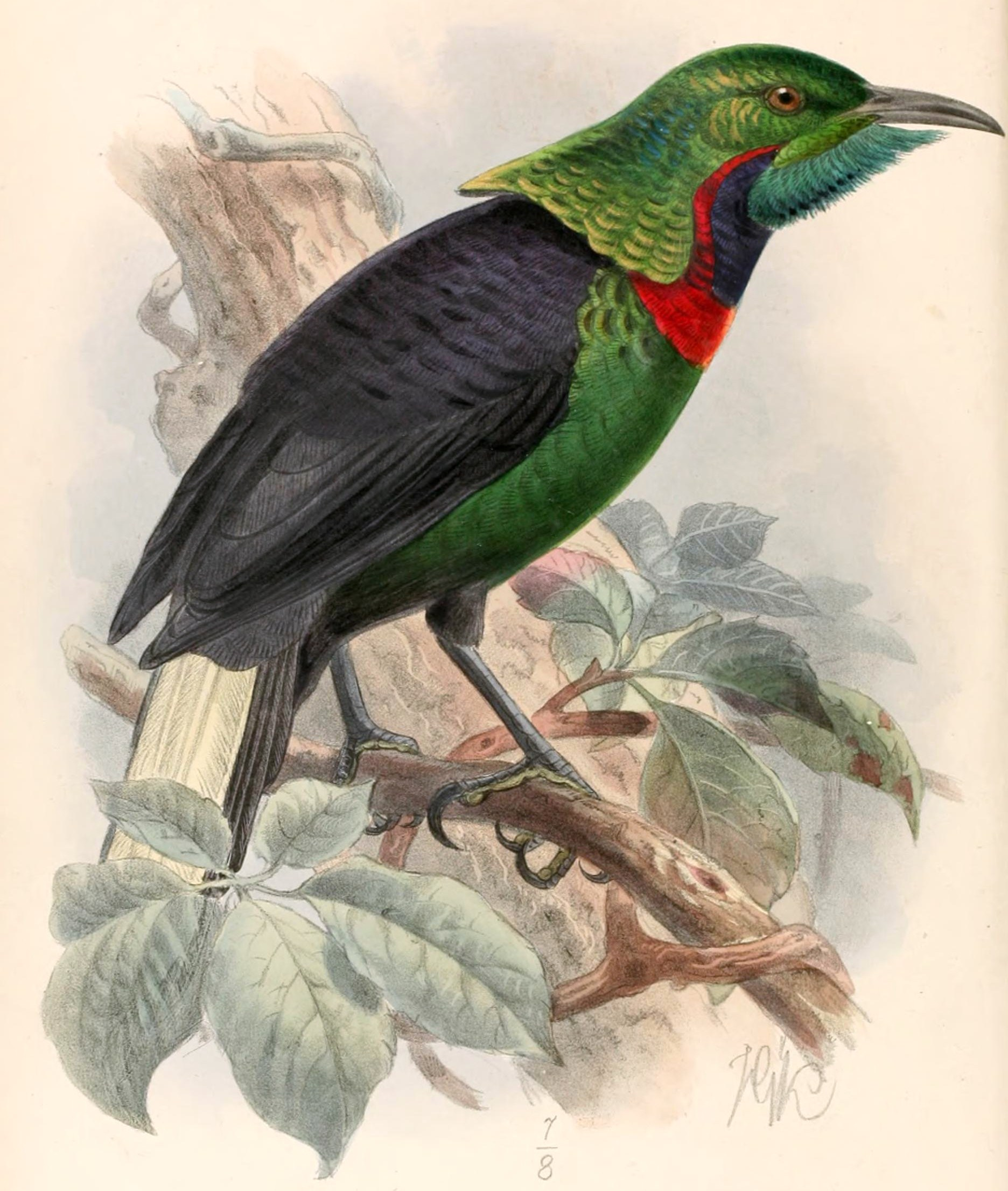
- Vintage illustration of a male
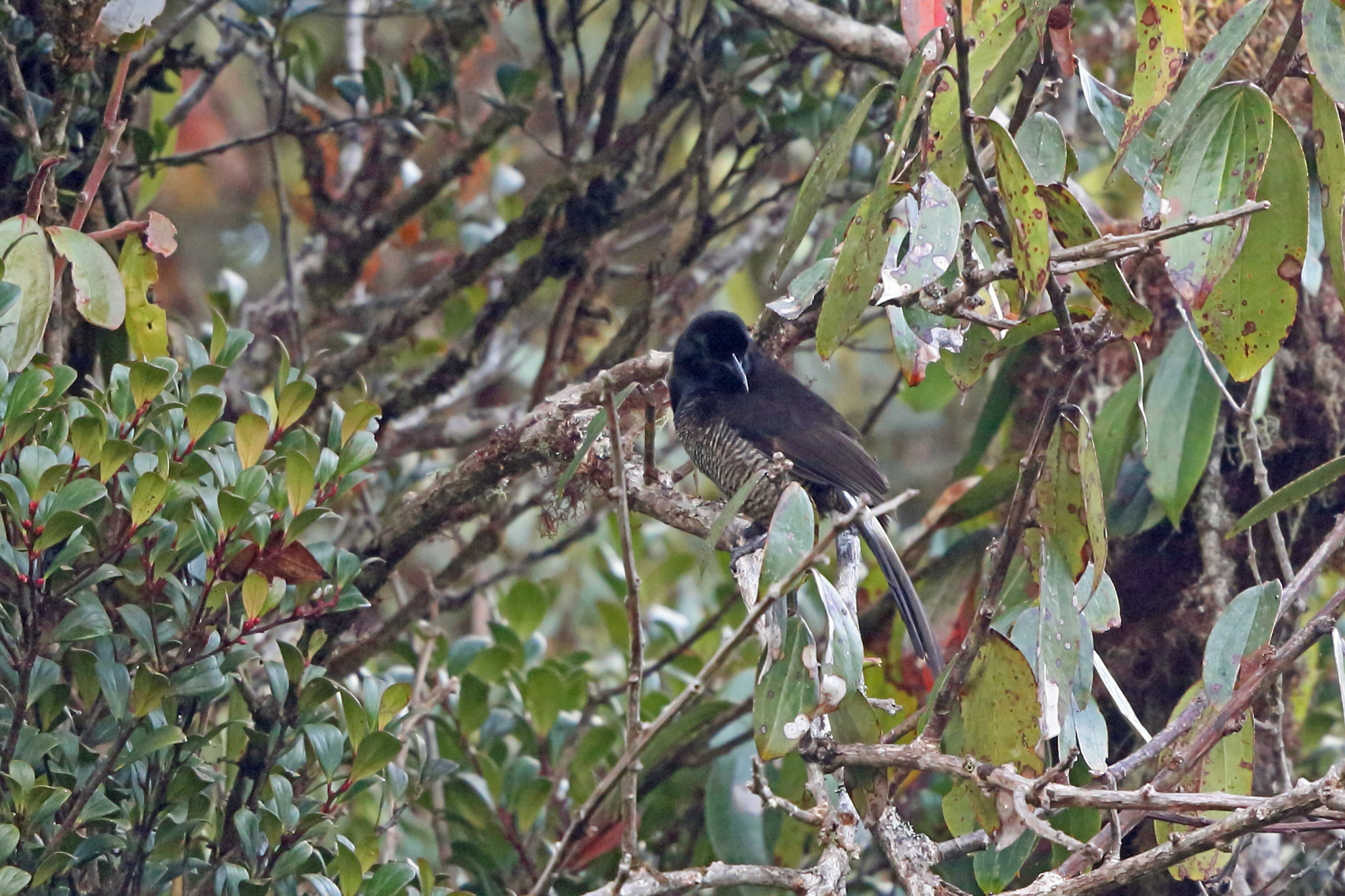
- Female

Conservation status
- Least Concern (IUCN 3.1)

Scientific classification
- Kingdom: Animalia
- Phylum: Chordata
- Class: Aves
- Order: Passeriformes
- Family: Paradisaeidae
- Genus: Astrapia
- Species: A. splendidissima

Binomial name
- Astrapia splendidissima Rothschild, 1895

= Splendid astrapia =

Species of bird

The splendid astrapia (Astrapia splendidissima) is a species of bird in the family Paradisaeidae, native to the montane forests of New Guinea. Males are known for their iridescent plumage and elaborate courtship displays, including branch-hopping, tail-flicking, and frog-like calls; they may also display in leks.

Its diet consists mainly of fruit, along with insects, lizards, and frogs. Males are generally solitary, while females raise the young and may forage in small groups. The species is considered stable, though habitat loss may pose a future threat. Two subspecies are recognized, and hybridization with other astrapias has been reported.

== Taxonomy and evolution ==
Studies suggest that the splendid astrapia and Arfak astrapia are sister species within the genus Astrapia. Together, they form a clade sister to the Huon, ribbon-tailed, and Stephanie’s astrapias, with the Huon astrapia representing the earliest-diverging lineage of that group. The bright green abdominal plumage shared by the splendid and Arfak astrapias is thought to represent an ancestral trait within the genus, whereas the darker underparts of the ribbon-tailed and Stephanie’s astrapias likely evolved later through divergent evolution.

The genus name, Astrapia, is derived from "Astraipios", and means lightning flash or glare. This refers to the brilliant iridescent plumage of species in the genus. Its specific name, splendidissima, means "most splendid", again referring to this particular astrapia's splendid colours. Historically, the splendid astrapia has been placed in its own genus, Calastrapia, which means "beautiful astrapia". Its subspecies helios' specific name simply means "sun", likely referring to its iridescence.

== Description ==
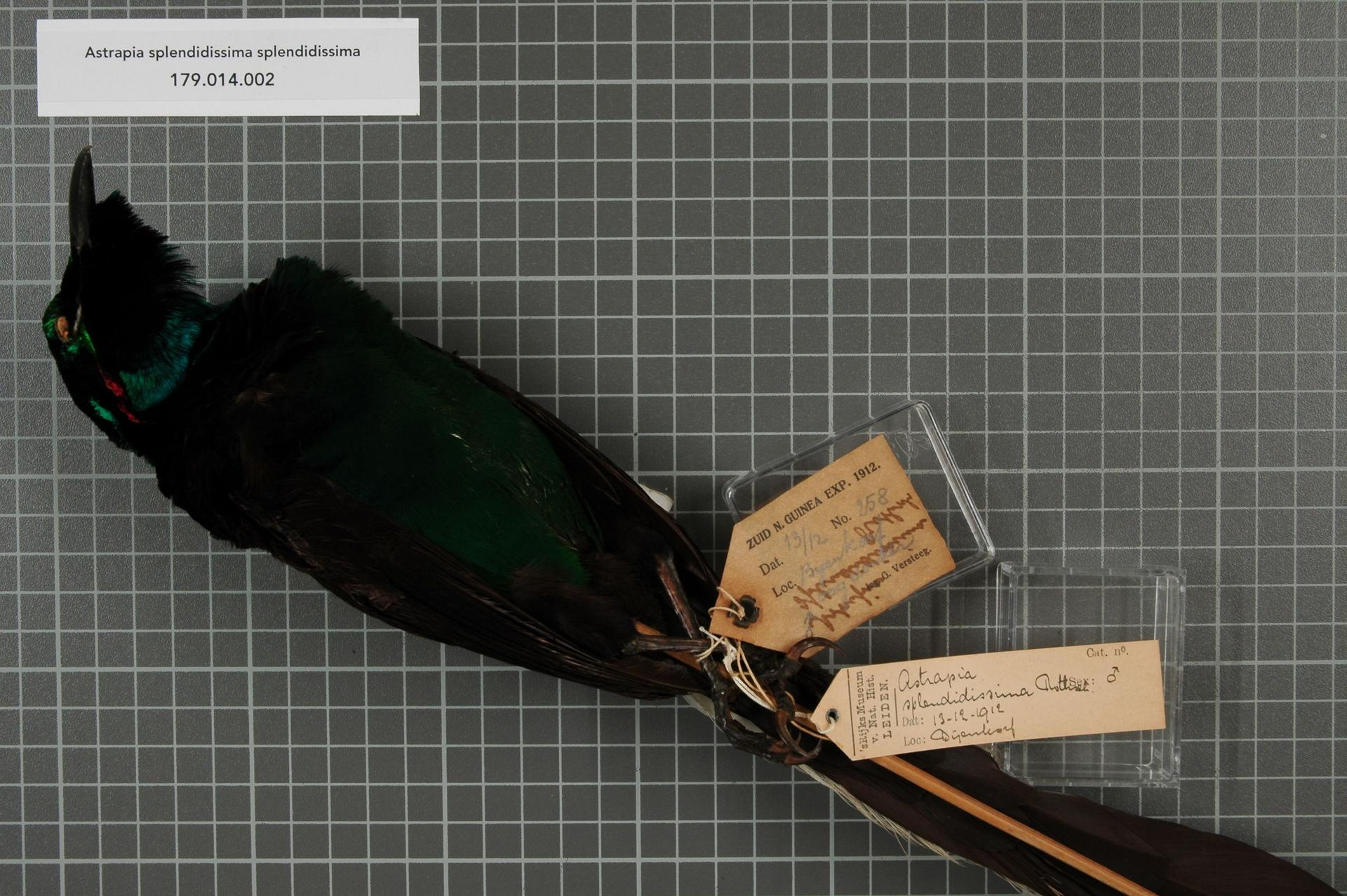
Specimen of a male A. s. splendidissima from the Naturalis Biodiversity Center. Note the shiny iridescent bluish-green chin and throat.

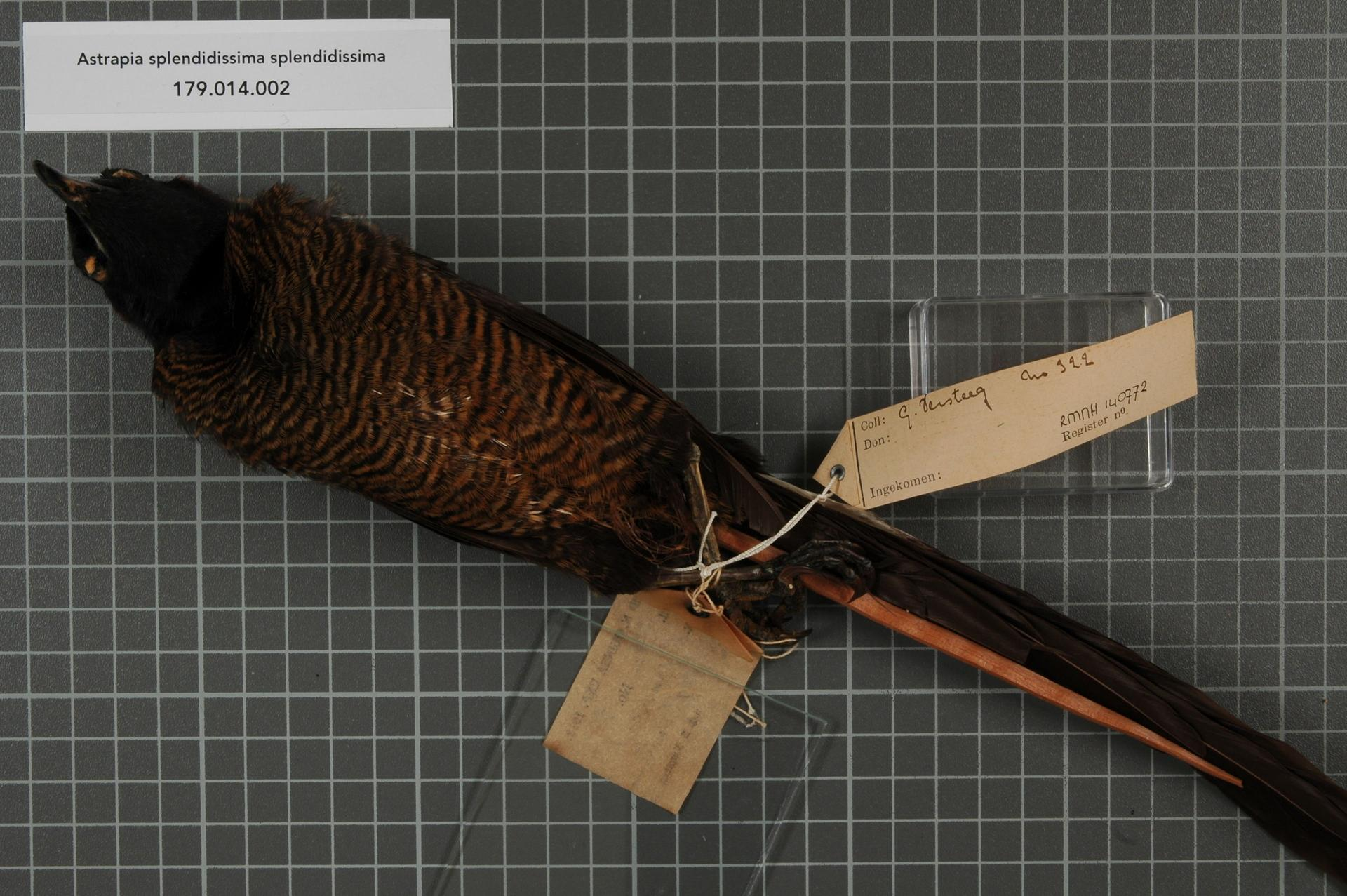
Female A. s. splendidissima specimen. As mentioned in the text, note how drastically different the plumage of the female is from the males'.

The splendid astrapia is a medium-sized bird-of-paradise species, and it is the smallest member of the Astrapia genus, with males averaging approximately 39 cm (15 in), the slightly smaller females coming in at 37 cm (15 in).

The male's head to mantle is a shiny iridescent light bluish-green to yellow-green, while the chin throat is more of a metallic turquoise to shiny green, depending on lighting. Beneath the throat is a coppery-red gorget that tappers as it moves up the side of the breast, all the way to the eyes. The rest of the underparts are a silky dark-green, except for the lower tail-coverts, which is more of a light brownish colour. The upperparts, like the wings and back, are brown to darkish brown. The relatively long tail is made up of two long, white plumes with black spatulate tips with a violet iridescence, and the feathers beneath those are plain black.

The drabber female has a dark brown to blackish head, lighter, dark brownish wings and back, dusky light brown underparts with heavy barring, and a similar tail to the male, but without a spatulate tip and a much more reduced amount of white on the upper tail. Subspecies helios is larger than splendidissima, male has a more blue than yellow-green crown, and larger spatulate tips on the longer two central feathers, and female has darker upperparts. They have dark-coloured eyes, lead-grey legs and bill, and dark grey claws.

=== Hybrids ===
The mysterious bird of Bobairo, which was found and named in 1953, is probably a hybrid of the black sicklebill and the splendid astrapia, but could be a hybrid of a sicklebill and a Vogelkop lophorina, or just a hybrid throwback, showing characteristics from earlier generations of crossbreeding. It is possible that, due to the overlap in the distribution ranges, the ribbon-tailed astrapia and the splendid astrapia may have potential hybrid behaviour. However, none have been observed.

=== Vocalization ===
Call

Much like most of its family members, the splendid astrapia makes its own unique, though eccentric, vocalizations. A very distinguishable, insect-like "tik to-keet" note is produced by the birds with varying speed, and the "keet" portion sounding akin to a brief whistle; however they also make frog-like croaks, yelps composed of "wroo-wree woo" notes, and simple "teeks" and "toks". Often confused for vocalizations, the splendid astrapia also produces a non-vocal rattling sound with its wings in flight.

== Distribution and habitat ==
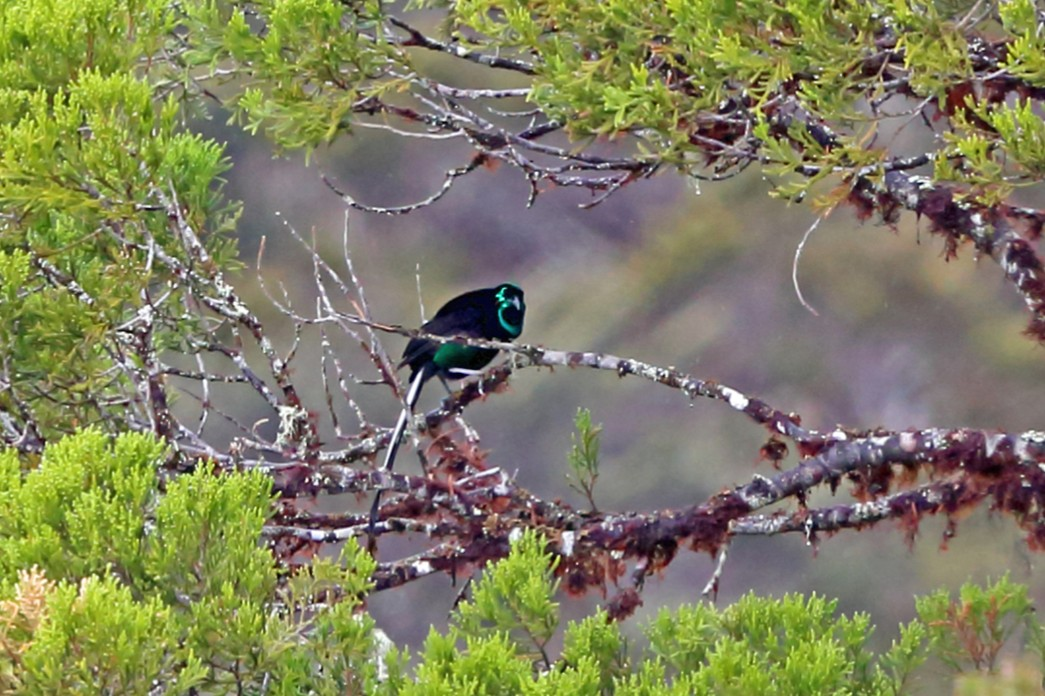
Perched male of the subspecies A. s. helios.

The splendid astrapia is endemic to the central cordillera of New Guinea, ranging from the Weyland Mountains eastward through the Star, Hindenburg, and Victor Emanuel ranges. The eastern limits of its distribution remain poorly defined, though the species may come into contact with the ribbon-tailed astrapia near the Strickland Gorge region. It occurs primarily at elevations of 5,740–11,320 ft, most commonly between 6,890 and 8,860 ft. The species inhabits montane and upper montane forest, including forest edges, secondary growth, and adjacent scrubby vegetation. It is most often associated with the forest mid-canopy and upper strata, though individuals may occasionally descend lower while foraging.

== Behaviour ==
=== Courtship ===
Male courtship song

The splendid astrapia performs a perch-hopping courtship display in which the male adopts a hunched posture with expanded neck and mantle feathers, forming a conspicuous “beard” beneath the lower mandible. The displaying male then rapidly hops between branches through the canopy while keeping the body largely horizontal, occasionally spreading the wings for balance and using the stiffened tail as a rudder. Displays often conclude with harsh, frog-like vocalizations.

Males also produce repeated “tch tch tch” calls accompanied by ritualized tail movements, lowering the tail and flicking it side to side to expose the white bases of the tail feathers. Courtship calls are generally simple, consisting of nasal or buzzy frog-like notes described as sounding similar to “ger ger ti” or “jereet”. Non-vocal rattling sounds produced by the wings during flight have also been recorded.

Observations of several displaying males spaced along forest edges in Papua New Guinea suggest the species may engage in a loose form of lek mating, in which multiple males display within the same area to attract females. Ritualized nape-pecking behavior similar to that of other astrapias may also occur during courtship.

=== Nestling and breeding ===
The splendid astrapia is believed to be polygynous, with adult males living separately from females and juveniles and contributing nothing in the chick-rearing process. Males display from elevated arboreal perches near forest edges and natural clearings, while females are more inconspicuous and typically remain within the forest canopy and dense understory vegetation. Nest-building has been recorded in March, with eggs observed in October and nestlings documented in November. Although the breeding biology of the species remains poorly known, females are thought to lay a single egg per clutch. Juveniles have been observed in August and November.

Immature females look like their adult form, but with a dark brown crown and hind neck; immature males go through three different appearances before becoming an adult. In the first stage, the male juvenile looks like adult female but has darker underparts with narrower light bars. In the second stage, the male juvenile gains a shiny green throat and crown starting from the line between the eyes, with green and ruby-colored feathers scattered across its hind neck and upper back. In the third stage, the juvenile resembles the adult male, but its lower breast and the feathers near the base of the tail still look like those of the adult female, with some patches of sea-green feathers.

=== Diet and foraging ===
Fruit, particularly species of Schefflera, Pandanus, and Trema orientale, comprises the majority of the splendid astrapia’s diet. It also consumes insects and other small animal prey such as lizards and frogs. The species forages primarily in the forest canopy and midstory, where it methodically searches moss-covered trunks, branches, and epiphytes for arthropods while also feeding on small to medium-sized fruits. Males are generally solitary while foraging, moving carefully through dense montane forest and frequently hopping or climbing along mossy branches and tree trunks in search of prey.

== Population and conservation ==
The global population size of the splendid astrapia is unknown, but the species is reported to be common and widespread in Papua New Guinea. It is evaluated as Least Concern on the IUCN Red List of Threatened Species. It is listed on Appendix II of CITES.

The splendid astrapia is believed not to approach the thresholds for vulnerable under the population size criterion, which is under 10000 mature individuals with a continuing decline estimated to be over 10% in ten years or three generations.

This species has a medium reliance on forest habitats, and the tree cover within its distribution range has declined by 2.3% over the past three generations. Therefore, the researcher suggests that the loss of habitat may have caused a population decline of approximately 1% to 19% during the same perio.

Although the population shows a decreasing trend, the rate of decline is not fast enough to meet the threshold for Vulnerable status under the population trend criterion, which requires a reduction of more than 30% within ten years or three generations.

The splendid astrapia is in little demand in the local market in Papua. The skins of males of this species were seen in the local market only twice during seven years. Records show that the skins of the male bird were seen in the local market only twice, selling for K20 (£4.85) in 1993. It is probably deemed less attractive for personal decoration because it doesn't have the long tail feathers that other astrapias have. Therefore, the splendid astrapia is likely safe from major threats and is commonly seen in some areas of its habitat, as at Okbap, in the Star Mts, and the Hindenburg Range, while it seemed uncommon and localised at Lake Habbema (Snow Mts) in 2015.
