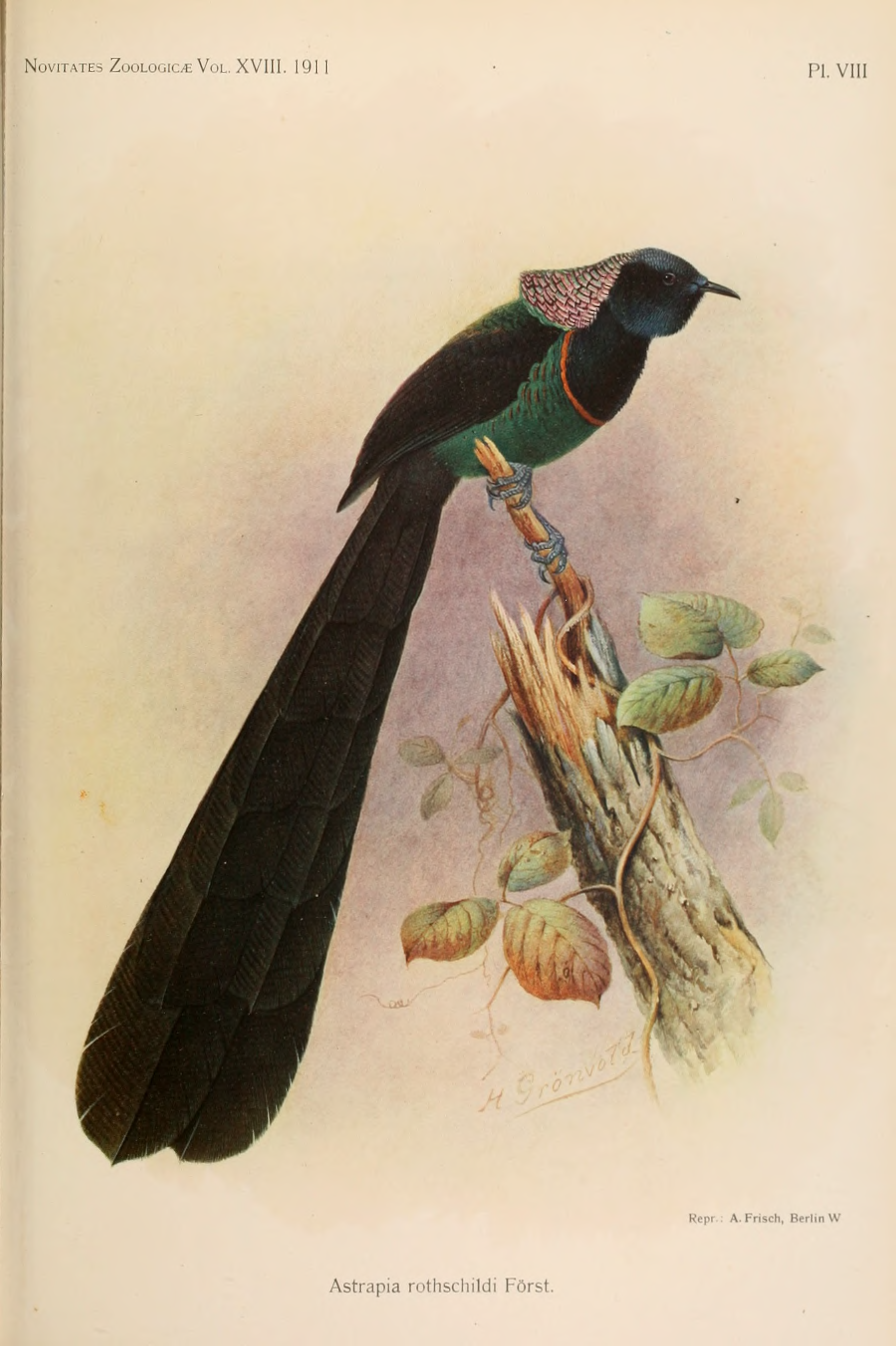
- Illustration depicting a male A. rothschildi.

Conservation status
- Least Concern (IUCN 3.1)

Scientific classification
- Kingdom: Animalia
- Phylum: Chordata
- Class: Aves
- Order: Passeriformes
- Family: Paradisaeidae
- Genus: Astrapia
- Species: A. rothschildi

Binomial name
- Astrapia rothschildi Förster, JFN, 1906

= Huon astrapia =

Species of bird

The Huon astrapia (Astrapia rothschildi), also known as Rothschild's astrapia, Huon bird-of-paradise, or Lord Rothschild's bird-of-paradise, is a species of bird-of-paradise belonging to the genus Astrapia. Like most of its congeners, A. rothschildi is a rather elusive member of its genus and family.

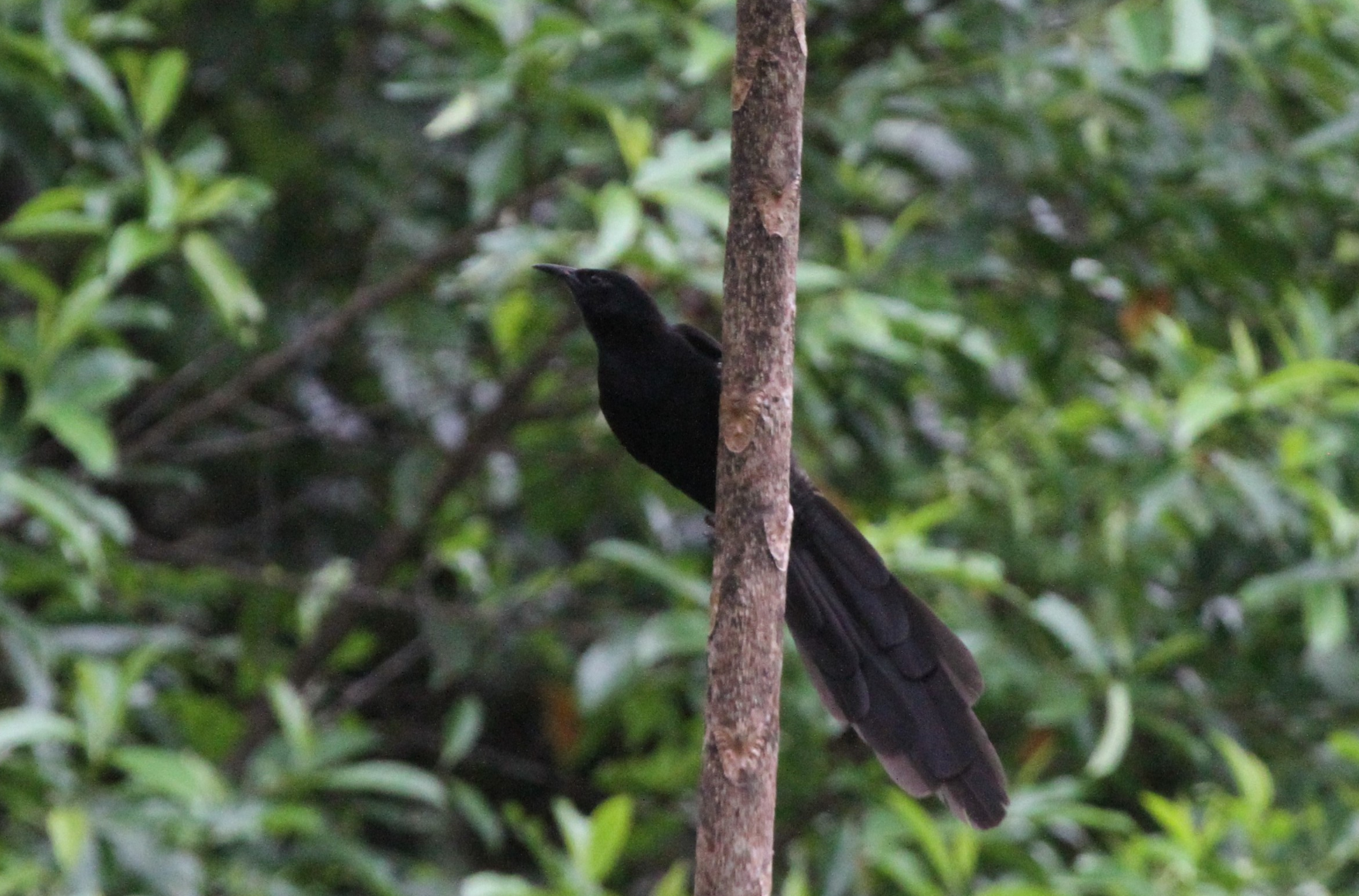
In Papua New Guinea

== Etymology ==
The generic name, Astrapia, is derived from the Greek word Astrapaios, which means "flash of lightning", referring to the iridescent plumage of the genus. Its specific name, rothschildi, is for Lord Walter Rothschild, a famous collector who kept the first specimen in his private museum sent to him by German naturalist Carl Wahnes.

== Description ==
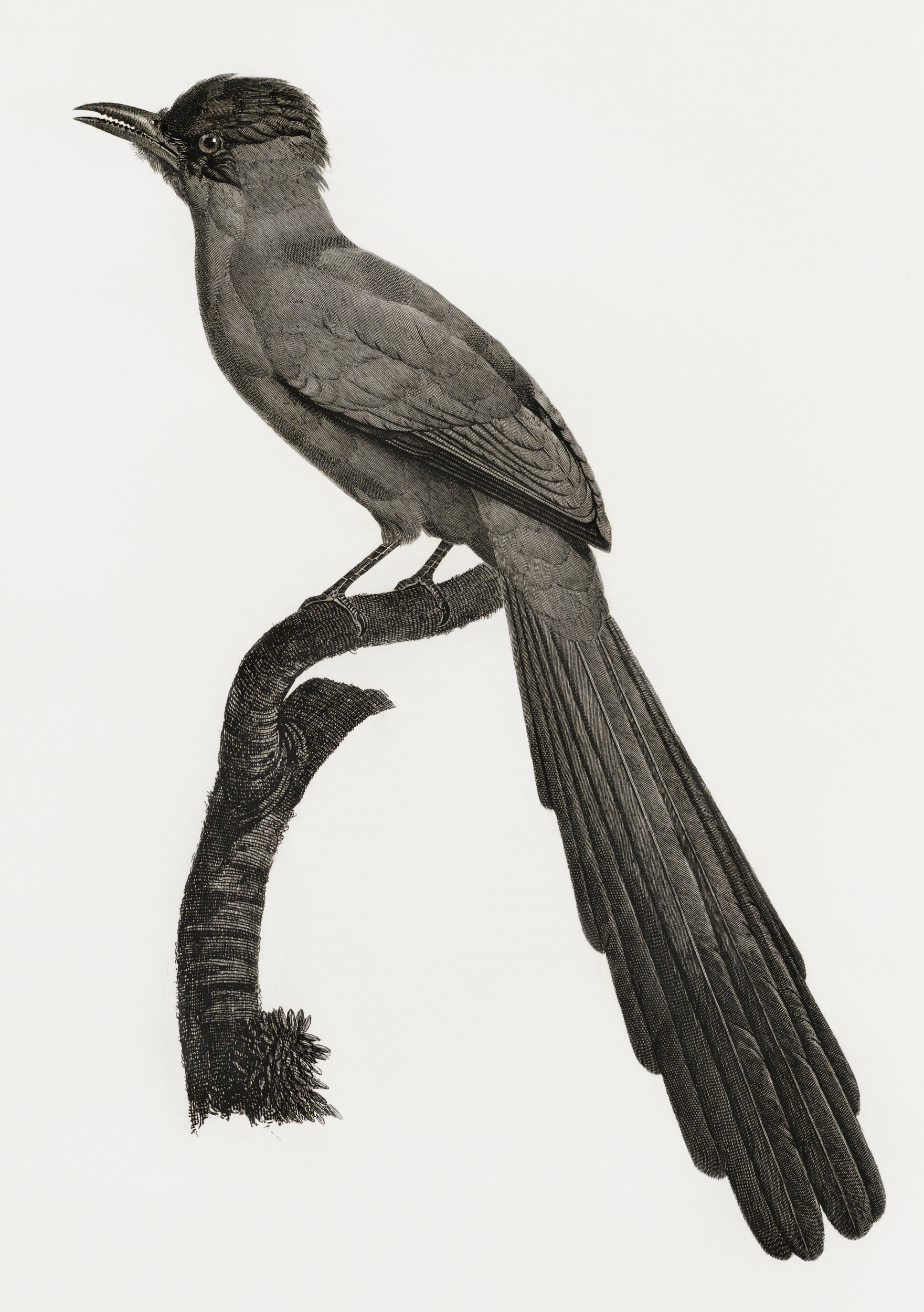
Illustration of a female A. rothschildi.

This little-known astrapia is a medium-sized bird-of-paradise species, excluding the tail. The males reach up to around 69 cm (27 in) long and weigh up to 205g, including the tail, while the smaller female is around 47 cm (18.5 in) long and weighs slightly less at 200g. The males' head to the breast are black with a velvety-blue iridescence, bordered by a characteristic iridescent, coppery-orange gorget-band; the hindneck is an elongated erectile cape with iridescent blue-green plate-like feathers, tipped pinkish-violet (cape may appear fully violet in some views.); upperparts, including wings, are black with a slight bronze-green sheen, underparts are a deep oily green, with larger, scale-like feathers down the sides a shiny lime-green; the impressively long tail feathers are purplish-black with a bluish sheen. The less-impressive females are mainly a dull brownish black, with slight, narrow pale barring ventrally; the upperparts are a lighter brown compared to the blackish head; and the tail is greatly shorter than the males' and generally similar in color, though drabbier and browner. It takes around 5–6 years to reach full adult plumage, like its congeners.

=== Vocalization ===
The vocalizations of the Huon astrapia are vaguely known, though its calls are described as a rough "jj jj jj"; However, when adult males take flight, their wings produce a "shek" noise akin to a sprinkler, like other members of the genus. Otherwise, they are generally silent and shy.

== Behavior and ecology ==
Little is known of the Huon astrapia's behavior.

=== Diet ===
A. rothschildi is known to feed on Pittosporum seeds and the fruits of the genera Heptapleurum and Freycinetia, as well as some animal matter, like skinks and possibly insects and arachnids, like nearly all of the Astrapia species. It tends to probe knotholes, pecking and tearing among moss and epiphytes while foraging. They spend most of their time in all levels of the forest, excluding the highest canopy, though they mainly feed in the lower levels.

=== Courtship and breeding ===
Breeding behavior is relatively vaguely known, though thanks to Tim Laman and Edwin Scholes' observations, their behavior is better understood. During courtship displays, the males start with a series of short hops between branches, which is known as perch-hopping. Next, he does what is called flick-pivoting, where he repeatedly turns from side to side all while fluttering his wings and opening and closing the long tail; similar to the related black sicklebill, Epimachus fastosus, their feet never leave their perch while displaying. Another display includes the inverted tail-fan involves the male fanning the long tail in various movements while hanging upside-down, while also pointing the glossy underparts upward and erecting their breast feathers into a black, circular shape with the iridescent coppery-orange gorget almost encircling the head. During this display, the male adjusts his position to suit the eye of the observing female constantly. Lastly, what is called a post-copulatory tumble occurs, where, after mating, the male and female tumble towards the ground, entangled together while doing dramatic twisting and flapping, an unusual behavior even for the eccentric Paradisaeidae family. Courtship takes place in the forest canopy. Nesting occurs from October to November; its nest is a firm, shallow cup made up of vines, dirt, rootlets, and roots, atop a foundation of broad leaves and moss, all constructed solely by the female. She lays a single, pinkish, blotched egg with fine streaks of lavender-greyish. Incubation period is not known, though the nestling period is up to 27 days, with all parental duties tended to by the female only.

=== Hybridization ===
A. rothschildi is not known to hybridize with any other Paradisaeids, though there has been a report of a tentative hybrid between it and the emperor bird-of-paradise, Paradisaea guilielmi, though this seems probably unlikely since the two frequent different altitudes.

== Subspecies and taxonomy ==
The Huon astrapia is monotypic. Within the Astrapia genus, it is seemingly in the middle of the tree, though it is more closely related to the ribbon-tailed (A. mayeri) and Stephanie's astrapias (A. stephaniae) than the Splendid (A. splendidissima) and Arfak (A. nigra) astrapias.

== Range and distribution ==
A. rothschildi is restricted to the Huon Peninsula of Papua New Guinea, in montane and subalpine forests from 1,460 to 3,500 m. Their display sites are found in ridge crests and forest edges. It is assumed to be sedentary.

== Status and conservation ==
The Huon astrapia is considered as Least Concern, though as poorly-known as it is, it almost comes in into the Data-Deficient category. It is listed in Appendix II of CITES. It is not routinely hunted, though the skins and tail feathers of the males are important cultural items for the people of Nokopo.
