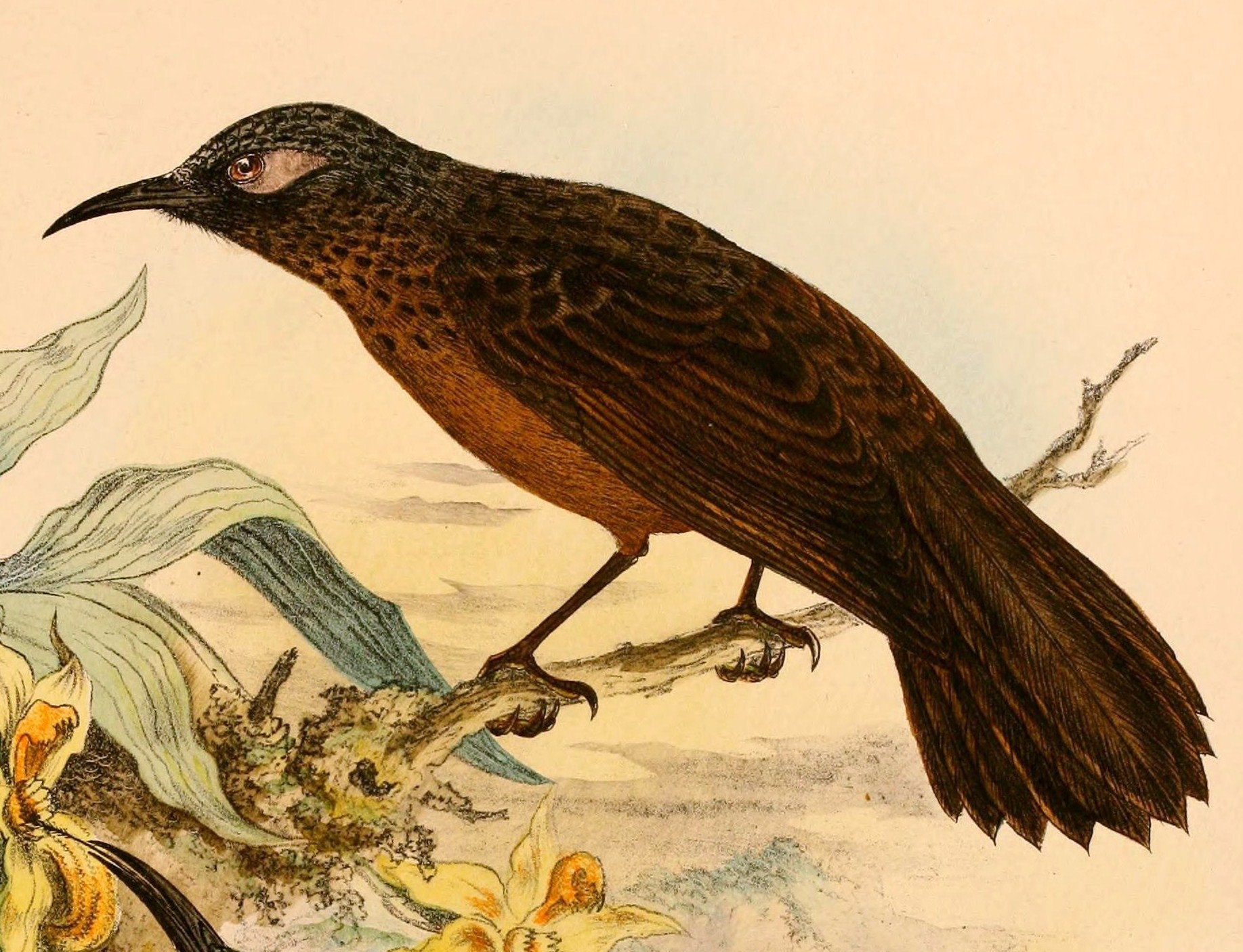
- White-eared myza (Myza sarasinorum)

Scientific classification
- Kingdom: Animalia
- Phylum: Chordata
- Class: Aves
- Order: Passeriformes
- Family: Meliphagidae
- Genus: Myza; A.B. Meyer & Wiglesworth, 1895

Type species
- Myza sarasinorum A.B. Meyer & Wiglesworth, 1895

= Myza =

Genus of birds

Myza is a genus of bird in the family Meliphagidae. Established by Adolf Bernhard Meyer and Lionel William Wiglesworth in 1895, it contains the following species:

| Image | Scientific name | Common name | Distribution |
|---|---|---|---|
| | Myza celebensis | Dark-eared myza | island of Sulawesi in Indonesia |
| | Myza sarasinorum | White-eared myza | Sulawesi in Indonesia |

The name Myza comes from the Greek word muzaō, meaning "to suck".
