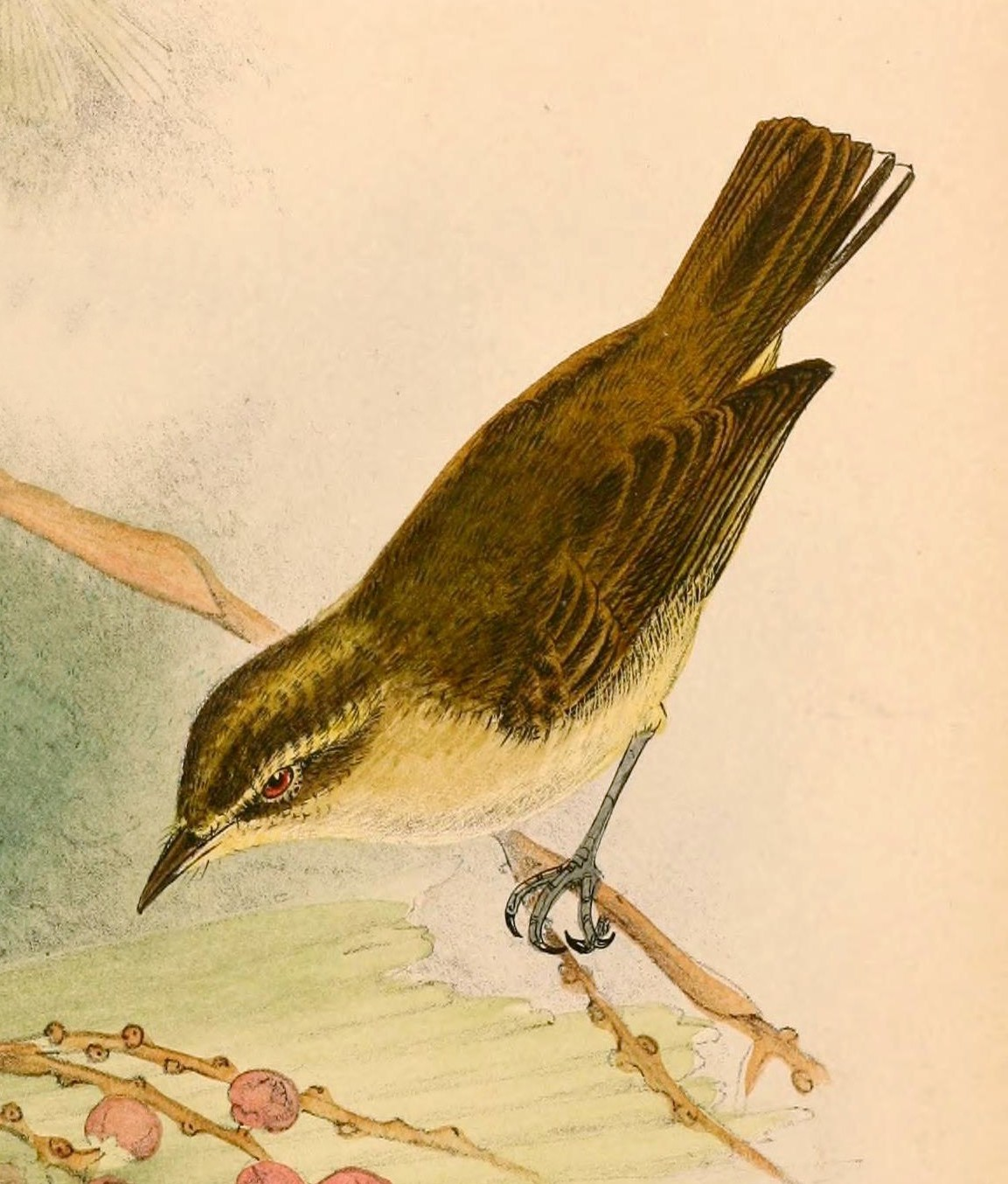
- Illustration by Adolf Bernhard Meyer and Lionel William Wiglesworth
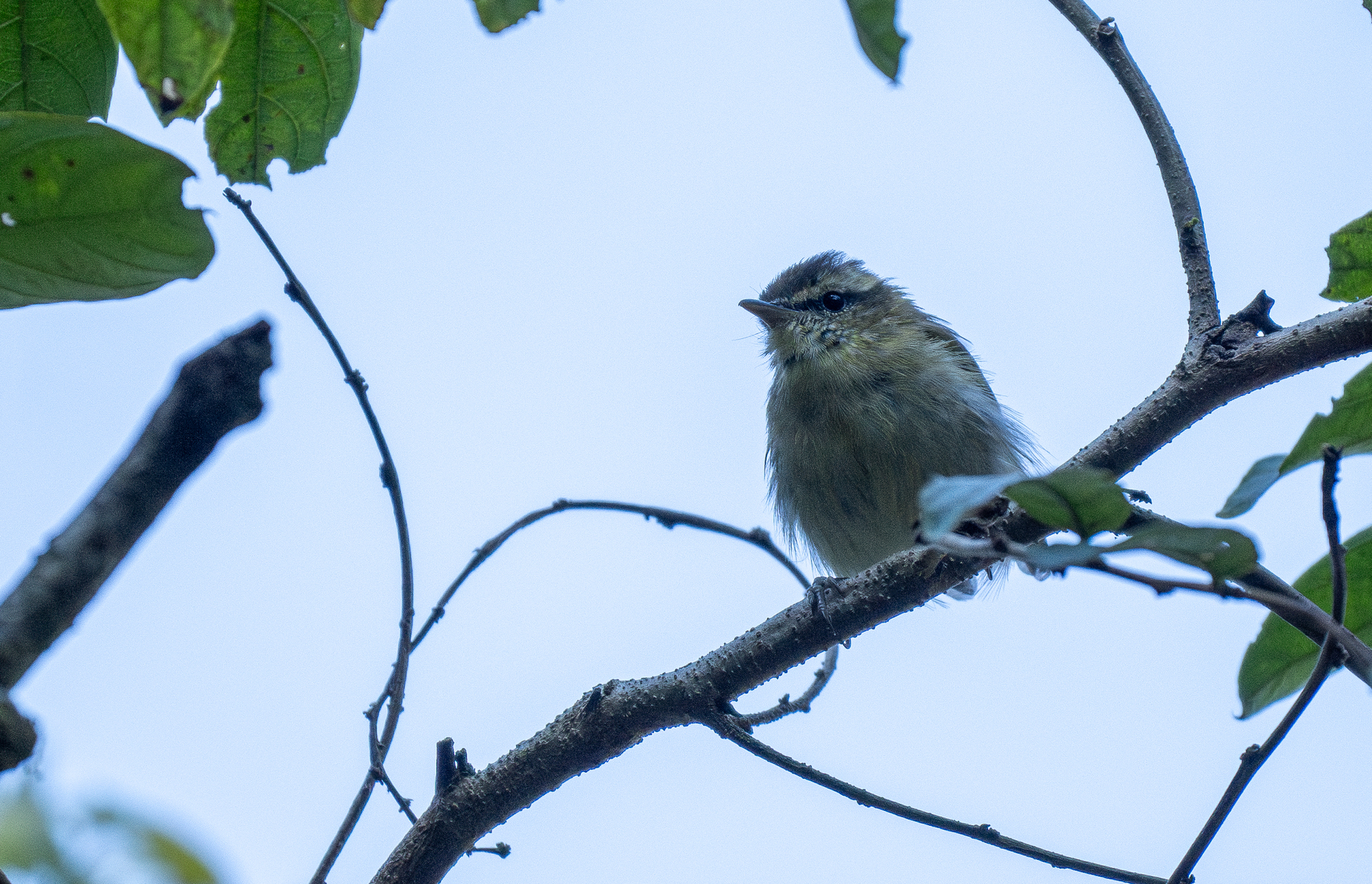

Conservation status
- Near Threatened (IUCN 3.1)

Scientific classification
- Kingdom: Animalia
- Phylum: Chordata
- Class: Aves
- Order: Passeriformes
- Family: Phylloscopidae
- Genus: Phylloscopus
- Species: P. sarasinorum

Binomial name
- Phylloscopus sarasinorum (Meyer & Wiglesworth, 1896)

= Lompobattang leaf warbler =

Species of bird

The Lompobattang leaf warbler (Phylloscopus sarasinorum) is a species of Old World warbler in the family Phylloscopidae. It is found only in Sulawesi Island, Indonesia. The Sulawesi leaf warbler (P. nesophilus) was formerly considered conspecific with the Lompobattang leaf warbler and both were grouped under the name P. sarasinorum, but more recent analyses indicate that it is a distinct species.

== Appearance ==
P. sarasinorum has a dark brown crown, and a broad, pale yellowish crown-stripe. Its upperparts are olive brown, and its underparts are whitish yellow. P. sarasinorum also has a wingbar made up of pale tips. Unlike P. sarasinorum, P. nesophilus lacks a crown-stripe, wingbar, and white in the outertail.
