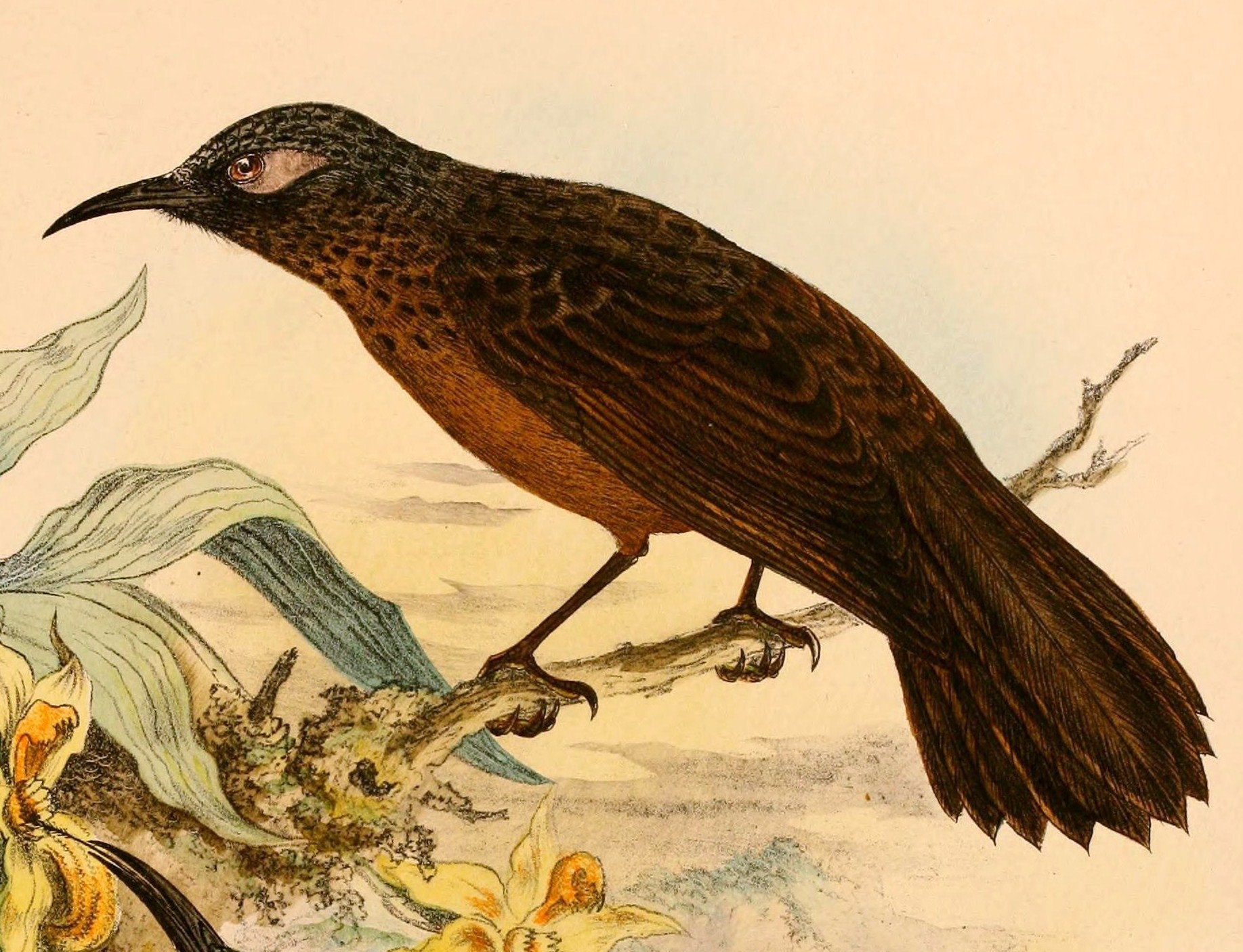

Conservation status
- Least Concern (IUCN 3.1)

Scientific classification
- Kingdom: Animalia
- Phylum: Chordata
- Class: Aves
- Order: Passeriformes
- Family: Meliphagidae
- Genus: Myza
- Species: M. sarasinorum

Binomial name
- Myza sarasinorum Meyer & Wiglesworth, 1895

= White-eared myza =

Species of bird

The white-eared myza or greater Sulawesi honeyeater (Myza sarasinorum) is a species of bird in the family Meliphagidae, with only its sharp calls revealing its presence. The white-eared myza is approximately 20 cm long.

It is endemic to the island of Sulawesi in Indonesia. It is regularly observed by specialised birding tours at Lore Lindu National Park in Central Sulawesi. Field observers have remarked on its squirrel-like behaviour as it scurries about the branches of moss-laden trees.

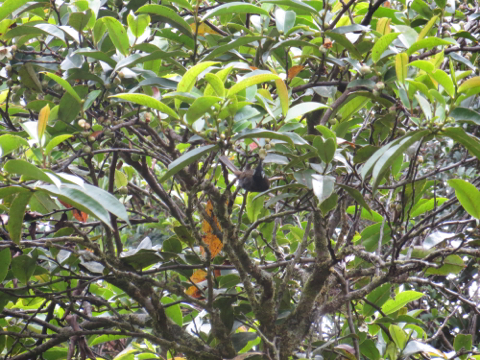
Feeding on Adinandra flowers

Its natural habitat is subtropical or tropical moist montane, usually between 1700 and 2800 metres.
