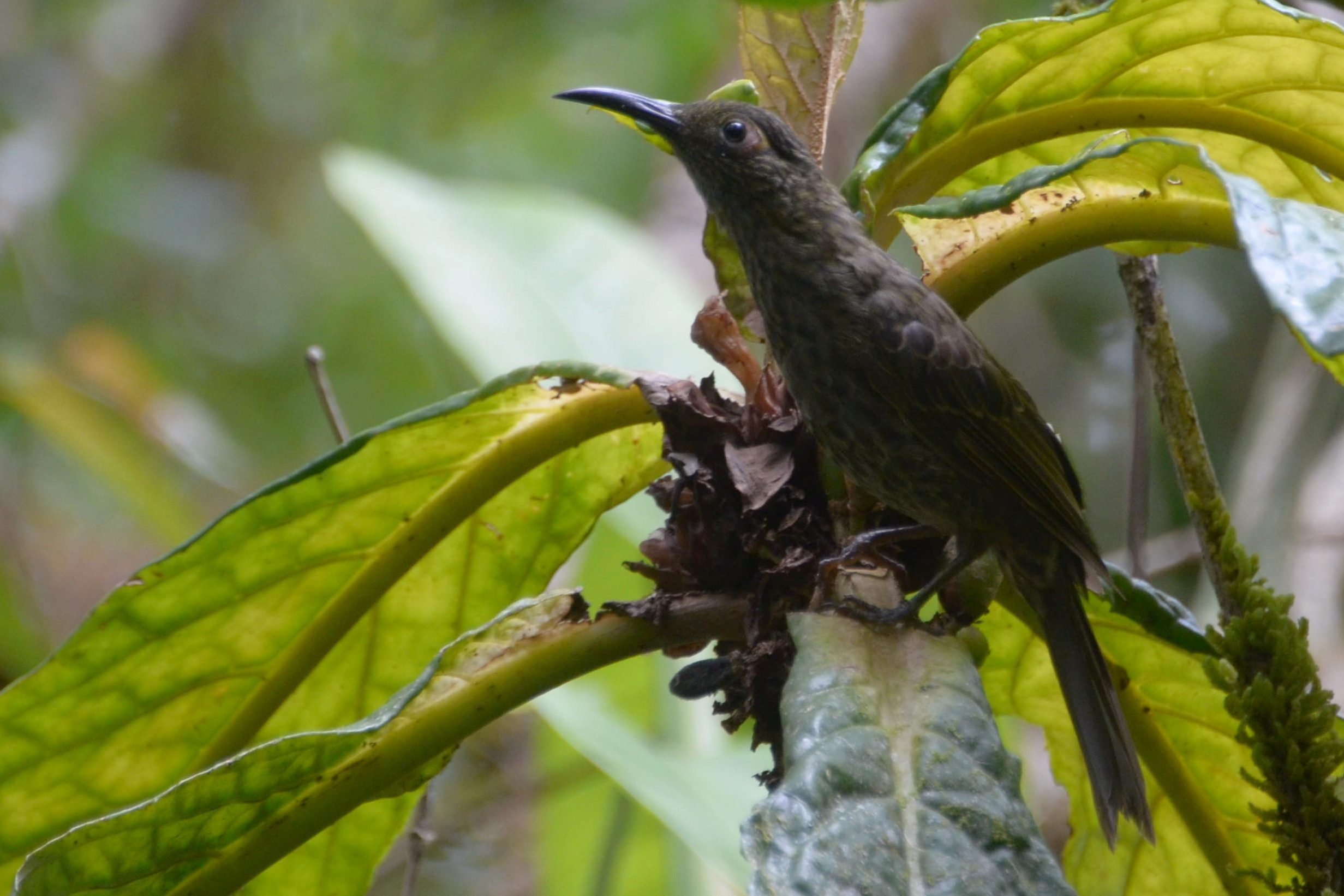

Conservation status
- Least Concern (IUCN 3.1)

Scientific classification
- Kingdom: Animalia
- Phylum: Chordata
- Class: Aves
- Order: Passeriformes
- Family: Meliphagidae
- Genus: Myza
- Species: M. celebensis

Binomial name
- Myza celebensis (Meyer, AB & Wiglesworth, 1894)

= Dark-eared myza =

Species of bird

Dark-eared Myza

The dark-eared myza (Myza celebensis), also known as the lesser streaked honeyeater, is a species of bird in the family Meliphagidae. It is endemic to the island of Sulawesi in Indonesia. There are two subspecies, Myza celebensis celebensis which is found in mountainous parts of northern, central and southeastern Sulawesi, and Myza celebensis meridionalis from mountains in southern Sulawesi.

== Description ==
The sexes are similar in appearance in the dark-eared myza but males are heavier than females and have longer heads, bills, wings and tail. The adult male is about 17 cm (6.7 in) in length and weighs about 21 g (0.7 oz). The head and neck are grey or olivaceous streaked with dark brown. The bill is dark-coloured, long and curved downwards, and there is a bare yellowish patch of skin surrounding the dark eye. The back, wings and tail are brown with streaks of darker brown and the underparts are also brown, but less streaked than the upper parts. Southern populations (subspecies meridionalis), have a greyer base colour.

== Ecology ==
The dark-eared myza is found in forests at elevations from 900 metres (3,000 ft) up to 1,800 metres (5,900 ft) in the north of the island and up to 2,500 metres (8,200 ft) in the south. It feeds from flowers and is described as darting rapidly from one inflorescence to another in its quest for nectar.

== Status ==
The dark-eared myza is common in the mountainous regions in Sulawesi which it inhabits and is estimated to have a total range of 42,100 square kilometres (16,300 sq mi). This means that it is considered by the IUCN to be of "least concern" as its range and population size exceed the threshold criteria for being listed in a more vulnerable category. One of the places where this bird can be seen is the Gunung Ambang Nature Reserve on Sulawesi.
