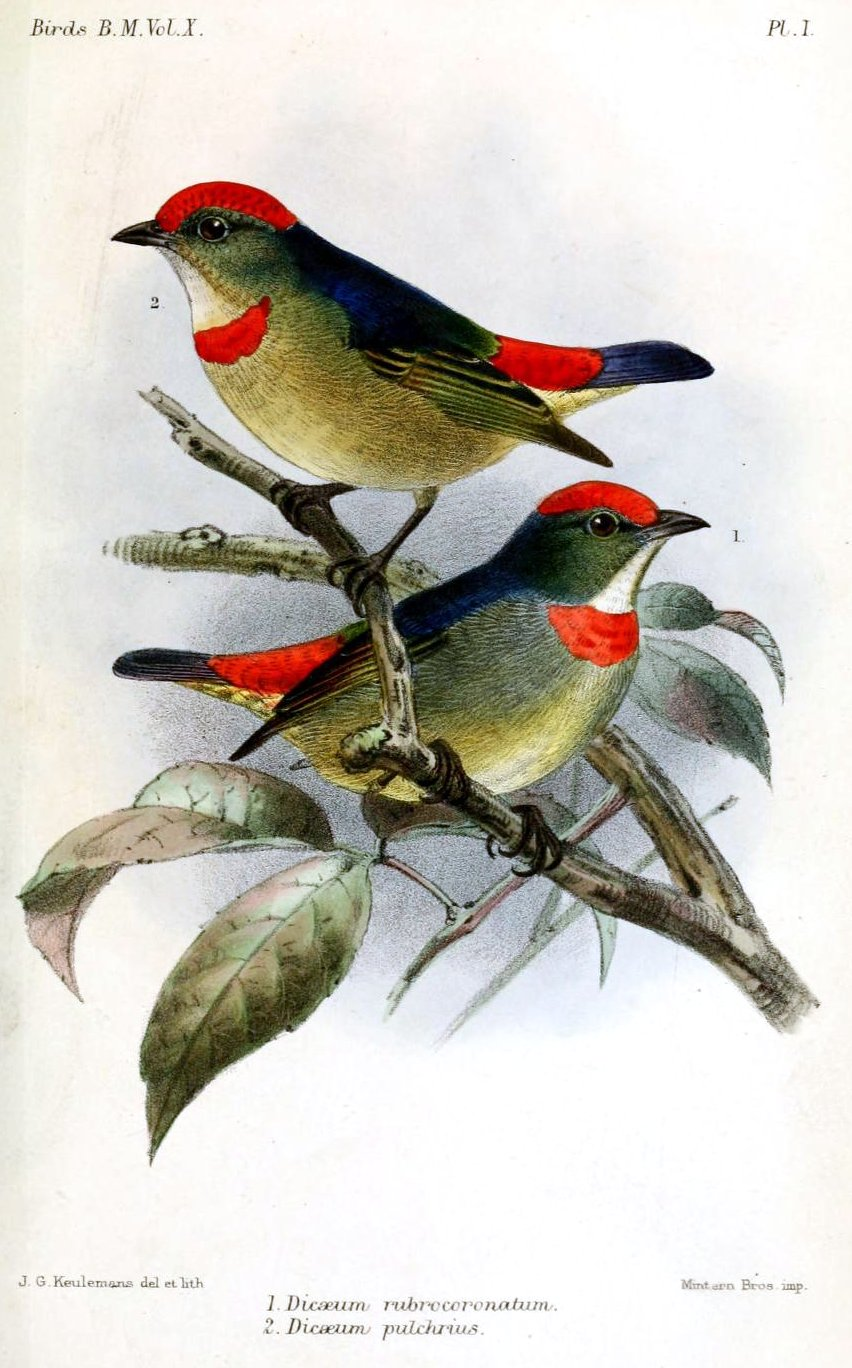
- Subspecies D. g. rubrocoronatum, illustration by Keulemans, 1885
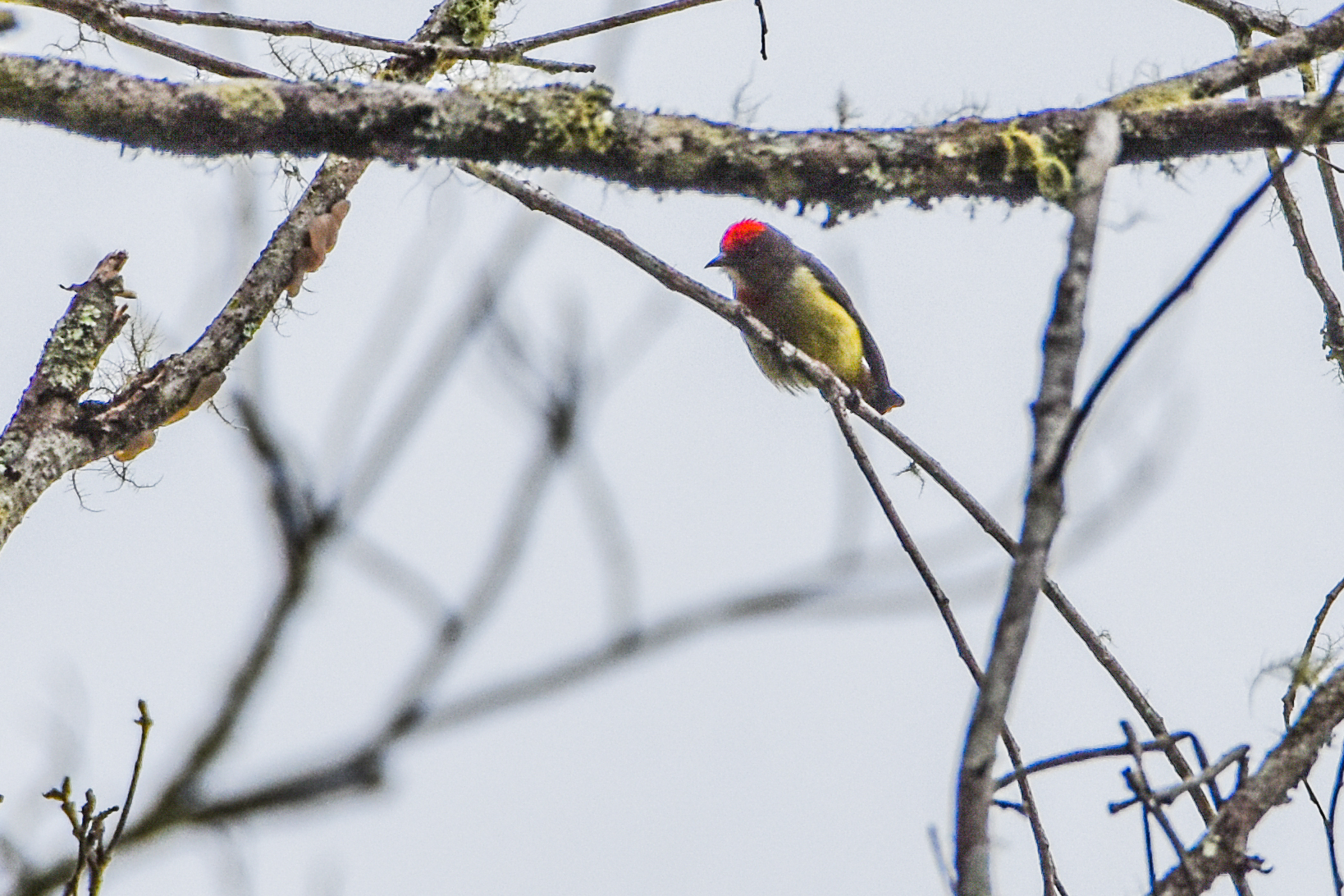

Conservation status
- Least Concern (IUCN 3.1)

Scientific classification
- Kingdom: Animalia
- Phylum: Chordata
- Class: Aves
- Order: Passeriformes
- Family: Dicaeidae
- Genus: Dicaeum
- Species: D. geelvinkianum

Binomial name
- Dicaeum geelvinkianum Meyer, 1874

= Red-capped flowerpecker =

Species of bird

The red-capped flowerpecker (Dicaeum geelvinkianum) is a small passerine bird endemic to, and widespread within, New Guinea and adjacent islands. It has recently been split from the olive-crowned flowerpecker Dicaeum pectorale.

== Identification ==
A common but inconspicuous tiny bird with short bill and tail, red cap, rump and, in the male, red spot on the breast.

== Habitat ==
Forest and woodland, including secondary growth and mangroves.

== Food ==
Small fruits, especially mistletoe, insects and spiders.
