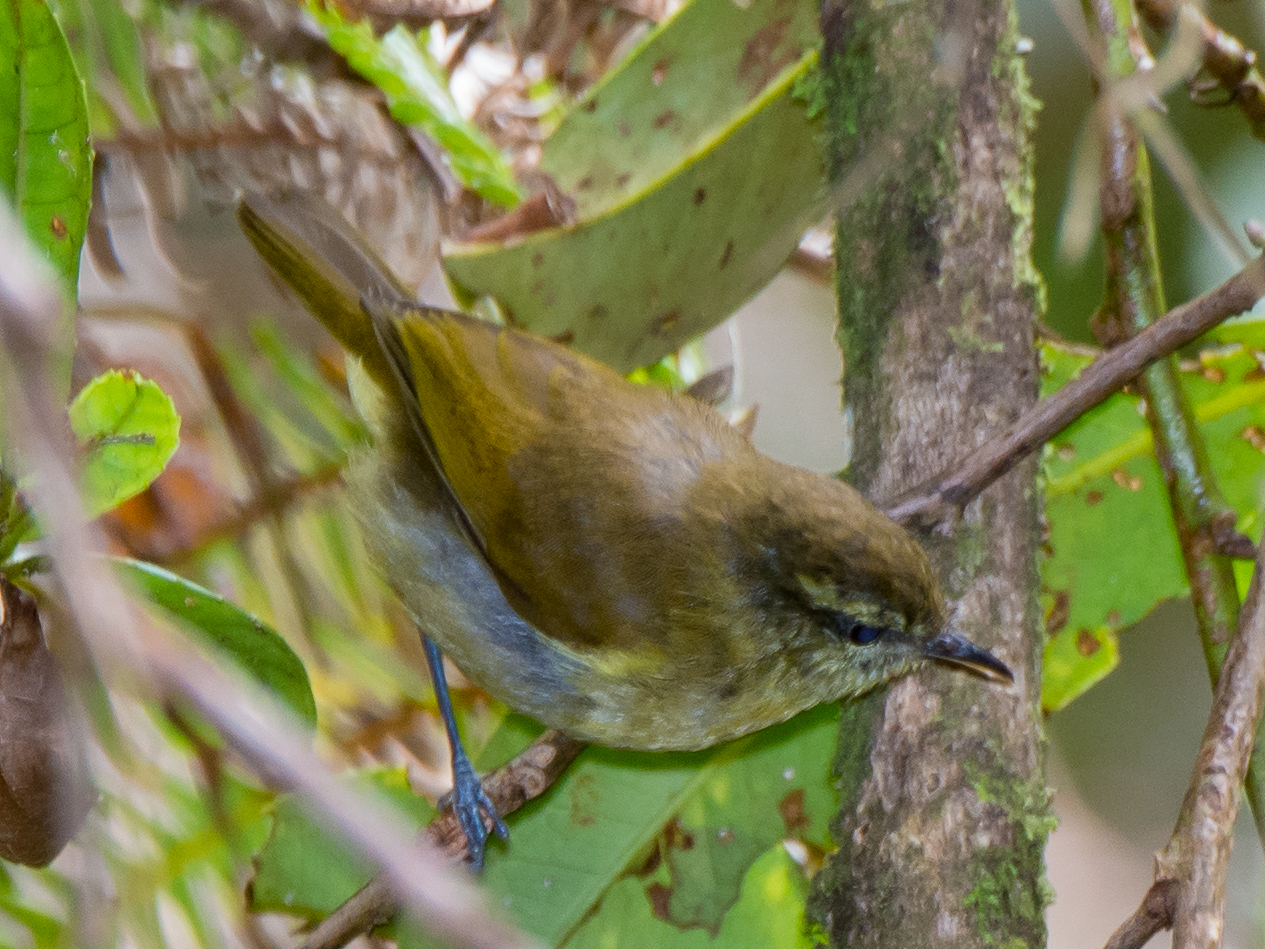

Scientific classification
- Kingdom: Animalia
- Phylum: Chordata
- Class: Aves
- Order: Passeriformes
- Family: Phylloscopidae
- Genus: Phylloscopus
- Species: P. nesophilus

Binomial name
- Phylloscopus nesophilus (Riley, 1918)

= Sulawesi leaf warbler =

Species of bird

The Sulawesi leaf warbler (Phylloscopus nesophilus) is a species of Old World warbler in the family Phylloscopidae. It is found only in Sulawesi Island, Indonesia. The Sulawesi leaf warbler (P. nesophilus) was formerly considered conspecific with the Lompobattang leaf warbler and both were grouped under the name P. sarasinorum, but more recent analyses indicate that it is a distinct species.
