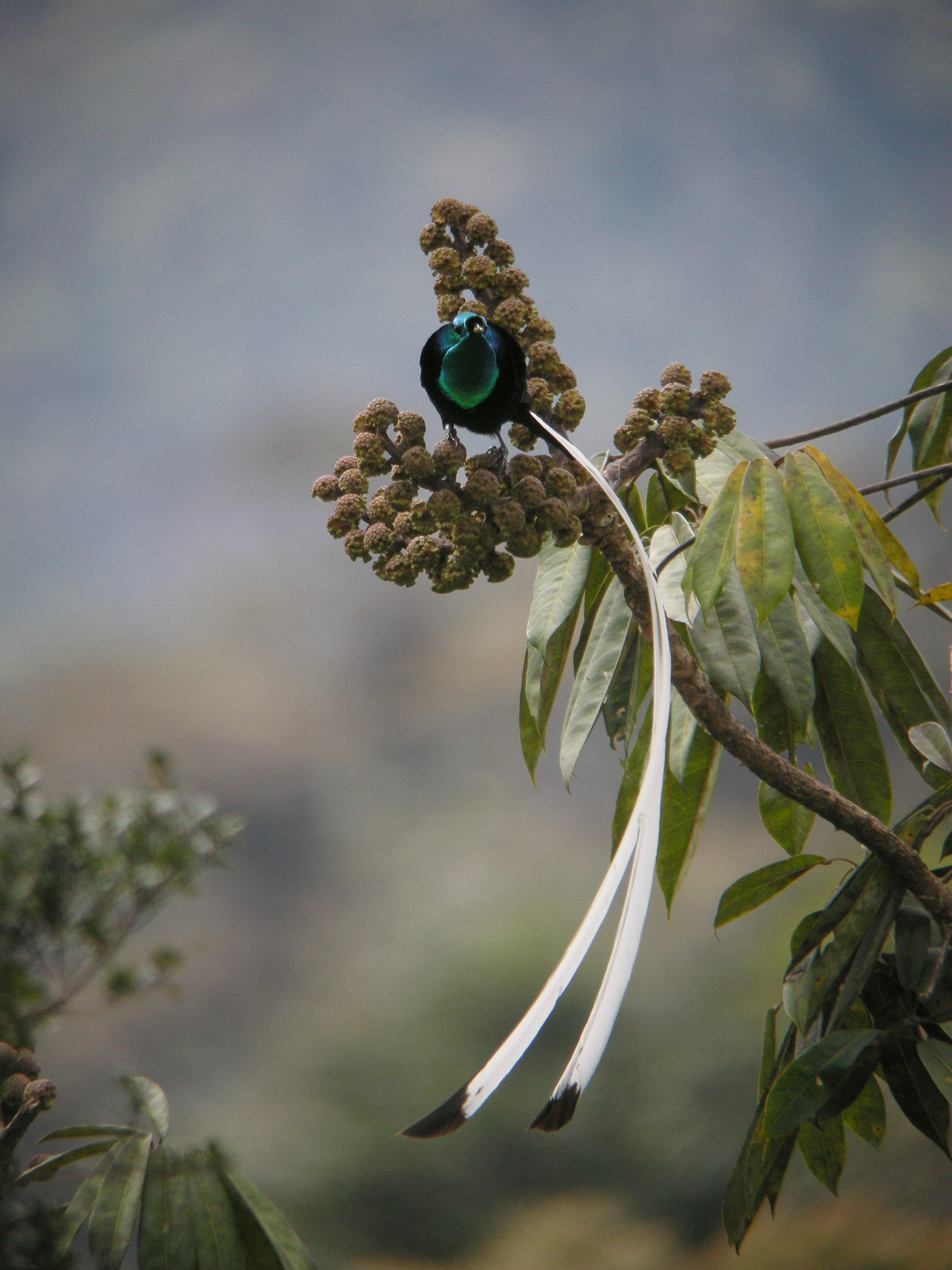
- Ribbon-tailed astrapia (Astrapia mayeri)

Scientific classification
- Kingdom: Animalia
- Phylum: Chordata
- Class: Aves
- Order: Passeriformes
- Family: Paradisaeidae
- Genus: Astrapia; Vieillot, 1816

Type species
- Paradisea nigra Gmelin, JF, 1788

= Astrapia =

Genus of birds

Astrapia (Vieillot, 1816) is a genus of birds-of-paradise. The genus contains five species, all endemic to New Guinea. The males have highly iridescent plumage and remarkably long tails. Females are duller and have shorter tails.

Barnes's astrapia is a hybrid produced by the interbreeding of Princess Stephanie's astrapia and the ribbon-tailed astrapia.

== Taxonomy ==
The genus Astrapia was introduced in 1816 by the French ornithologist Louis Pierre Vieillot to accommodate the Arfak astrapia, which therefore becomes the type species. The genus name is derived from Ancient Greek astrapios or astrapaios meaning "of lightning".

The genus is suggested to be monophyletic, roughly six million years old, and forms a sister-group with the two species in the genus Paradigalla. Astrapia and Paradigalla are members of a larger clade that includes the other long-tail birds-of-paradise from the genus Epimachus.

=== Species ===
The genus contains five species:

Image	Scientific name	Common name	Distribution
377×480px	Arfak astrapia	Astrapia nigra	Arfak Mountains; possibly from Tamrau Mountains
406×480px	Splendid astrapia	Astrapia splendidissima	New Guinea Highlands of western New Guinea
319×480px	Huon astrapia	Astrapia rothschildi	Huon Peninsula
360×480px	Ribbon-tailed astrapia	Astrapia mayeri	New Guinea Highlands of eastern New Guinea
	Stephanie's astrapia	Astrapia stephaniae	New Guinea Highlands of eastern New Guinea

The species level phylogeny of the genus has been determined by Martin Irestedt and collaborators.

- Astrapia
  - - Arfak astrapia (A. nigra)
    - Splendid astrapia (A. splendidissima)
  - - Huon astrapia (A. rothschildi)
    - - Ribbon-tailed astrapia (A. mayeri)
      - Stephanie's astrapia (A. stephaniae)

== Description ==
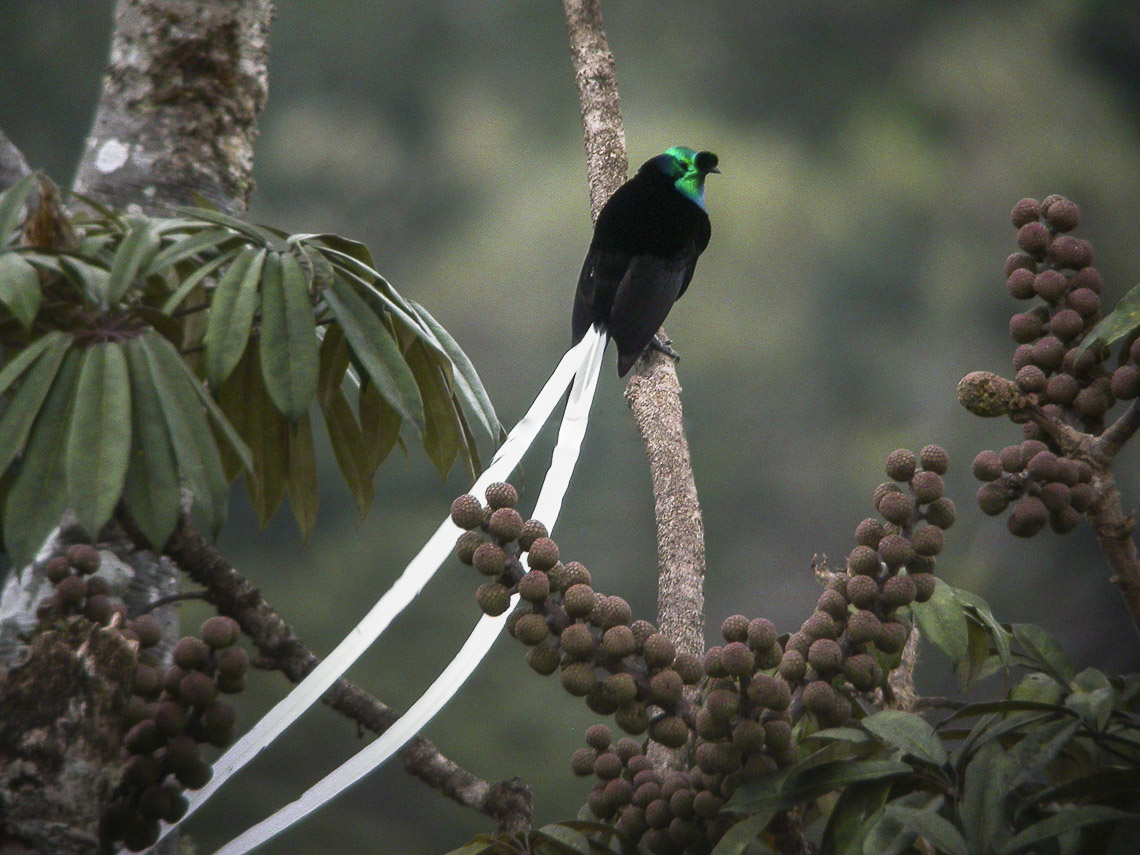
Ribbon-tailed Astrapia, Papua New Guinea

The five species of the genus Astrapia are endemic to New Guinea in the mountains of Volgelkop, the central ranges and the Huon Peninsula. Of these, three are allopatric—A. nigra, A. splendidissima and A. rothschildi. The other two—A. mayeri and A. stephaniae—overlap with each other at the margins of their respective elevation ranges in a small part of Papua New Guinea's central highlands.

All species within Astrapia exhibit sexual dimorphism. Adult males appear mostly jet-black under most lighting conditions, with highly iridescent greenish-blue heads, an intensely reflective coppery-orange band on the upper breast and either a deep violet (nearly black) or mostly white tail. The three allopatric species also have iridescent green lower abdomen. Adult females are duller blackish-brown, with smaller, white smudged tails running down their lengths.

== Behavior ==
=== Mating and breeding ===
Breeding behaviors are not well known, but all species are thought to be polygamous, with promiscuous males that use arboreal display sites, and with females providing all parental care. Summaries from species accounts indicate a few simple behaviors including a form of hoping back and forth between branches and an inverted display posture in A. rothschildi. At traditional sites in the forest canopy, Astrapia stephaniae is known to form leks.

There are seven distinct male courtship displays that have been documented: perch-hopping, pivoting, inverted tail-fanning, nape-pecking, post-copulatory tumbling, upright sleeked posturing and branch-sidling. Of the male behaviors, perch-hopping is the most broadly distributed among all species but A. nigra. In all of them, the displaying bird moves quickly between multiple branches by hopping or making short flight-hops. In A. rothschildi, hopping between perches sometimes includes chasing females (or female plumaged individuals). It is unclear if chasing is a component of perch-hopping in the other species.

A type of pivot display is known from two species, A. rothschildi and A. mayeri. In both, it involves repeatedly moving in a ritualized fashion from side-to-side with feet more-or-less in a fixed position. The most distinctive feature of the A. rothschildi pivot is wing flicking, whereas in A. mayeri the most distinctive features are the very ritualized hunchbacked posture and the highly exaggerated swishing movement of the male's long ribbon-like tail.

The Arfak astrapia and the Huon astrapia have a distinctive and specialized display behavior, which is called the inverted tail-fan display. When the abdominal feathers are sky-oriented during the display, their green iridescent feathers (that would appear otherwise dark) become highly visible; the splendid astrapia also has highly iridescent green abdominal plumage, which raises the question about if it too has an undocumented inverted display behavior.
