= Barnes's astrapia =

Scientific classification
- Domain: Eukaryota
- Kingdom: Animalia
- Phylum: Chordata
- Class: Aves
- Order: Passeriformes
- Family: Paradisaeidae
- Genus: Astrapia
- Species: A. stephaniae × A. mayeri

Synonyms
- Astrarchia barnesi; Astrapia barnesi

Hybrid bird

Barnes's astrapia, also known as Barnes's long-tailed bird-of-paradise or Barnes's long-tail, is a bird in the family Paradisaeidae and the genus Astrapia that is a likely hybrid between Stephanie's astrapia (A. stephaniae) and the ribbon-tailed astrapia (A. mayeri).

== Description ==
Barnes's astrapia is similar in appearance to both parent species, though closer to a ribbon-tailed astrapia. Males have two very long white and black tail feathers, glossy blue head and neck, small beak and a black body. Females have fewer blue feathers on their head as well as shorter tails.

== Taxonomy ==
Until 1930, Barnes's astrapia (and all the other hybrid birds-of-paradise) were thought to be species and were named as such. Barnes's astrapia was named Astrarchia barnesi by Iredale in 1948, under the presumption that it is a species.

== Distribution ==
Barnes's astrapia lives in the montane forest of Papua New Guinea, where the ranges of the parent species overlap on a small part of the Hagen Range and Mount Giluwe, usually at 2,300–2,600 m asl.
