= Fred Shaw Mayer =

Australian ornithologist, aviculturist and zoological collector

Frederick William Shaw Mayer MBE (26 September 1899 – 1 September 1989), also well known as "Masta Pisin" or the "Bird Man" in New Guinea, was an Australian ornithologist, aviculturist and zoological collector. He is notable for his work in New Guinea, especially with birds-of-paradise.

== Early years ==
Mayer was educated in Sydney at Homebush Primary School, Petersham High School and Sydney Grammar School. After leaving school Mayer had abortive career starts as a surveyor and in the building industry. Then he decided to follow his childhood interest in wildlife and became a zoological collector for museums and zoos.

== The wildlife collector ==
Mayer became very skilled at caring for live mammals and birds as well as preparing their skins. His abilities as a collector and preparator were recognised early in his life. After an initial self-funded collecting expedition to South-East Asia, Mayer collected extensively through the 1920s in South-East Asia and New Guinea, concentrating on New Guinea almost exclusively from the 1930s onward. A principal client of his was Walter Rothschild, for whom he supplied specimens for the Rothschild Zoological Museum at Tring in Hertfordshire, England. Other clients included John Spedan Lewis and Jean Delacour.

== The "Bird Man" ==
In 1953 Mayer became manager of Sir Edward Hallstrom’s aviaries at Nondugl in the Wahgi Valley of the Western Highlands of Papua New Guinea. This largely avicultural facility, which later became known as the Nondugl Bird of Paradise Sanctuary, acted mainly as a staging post for Taronga Zoo in Sydney, either to provide birds directly for Taronga, or for exchanges with other zoos. As well as managing the establishment, Mayer used it as a base for further collecting expeditions. He also became an expert on hand-rearing young birds-of-paradise.

Mayer was also involved in the establishment of the Baiyer River Sanctuary, set up after Hallstrom donated part of his collection of birds-of-paradise to the then Australian-administered government of Papua New Guinea. Despite health problems Mayer established the aviaries at the sanctuary in 1967 and acted as manager until it was opened in 1968, following which he stepped down. His final collecting trip in New Guinea took place early in 1970, from Lae to the Cromwell Mountains of the Huon Peninsula.

== Recognition ==
Mayer was appointed Member of the Order of the British Empire (MBE) in the 1971 New Year Honours, "for services to aviculture", for his work in establishing the Nondugl and Baiyer River sanctuaries, as well as for the breeding of birds-of-paradise. He was also made the first honorary life member of the Papua New Guinea Bird Society. He retired to Australia, living for many more years in Nambour, Queensland, where he died 25 days before his 90th birthday. He is commemorated in the names of several New Guinea animals, including the:

- Ribbon-tailed astrapia (Astrapia mayeri)
- Pygmy ringtail possum (Pseudochirulus mayeri)
- Shaw Mayer's brush mouse (Pogonomelomys mayeri)
- Shaw Mayer's water rat (Hydromys shawmayeri)
