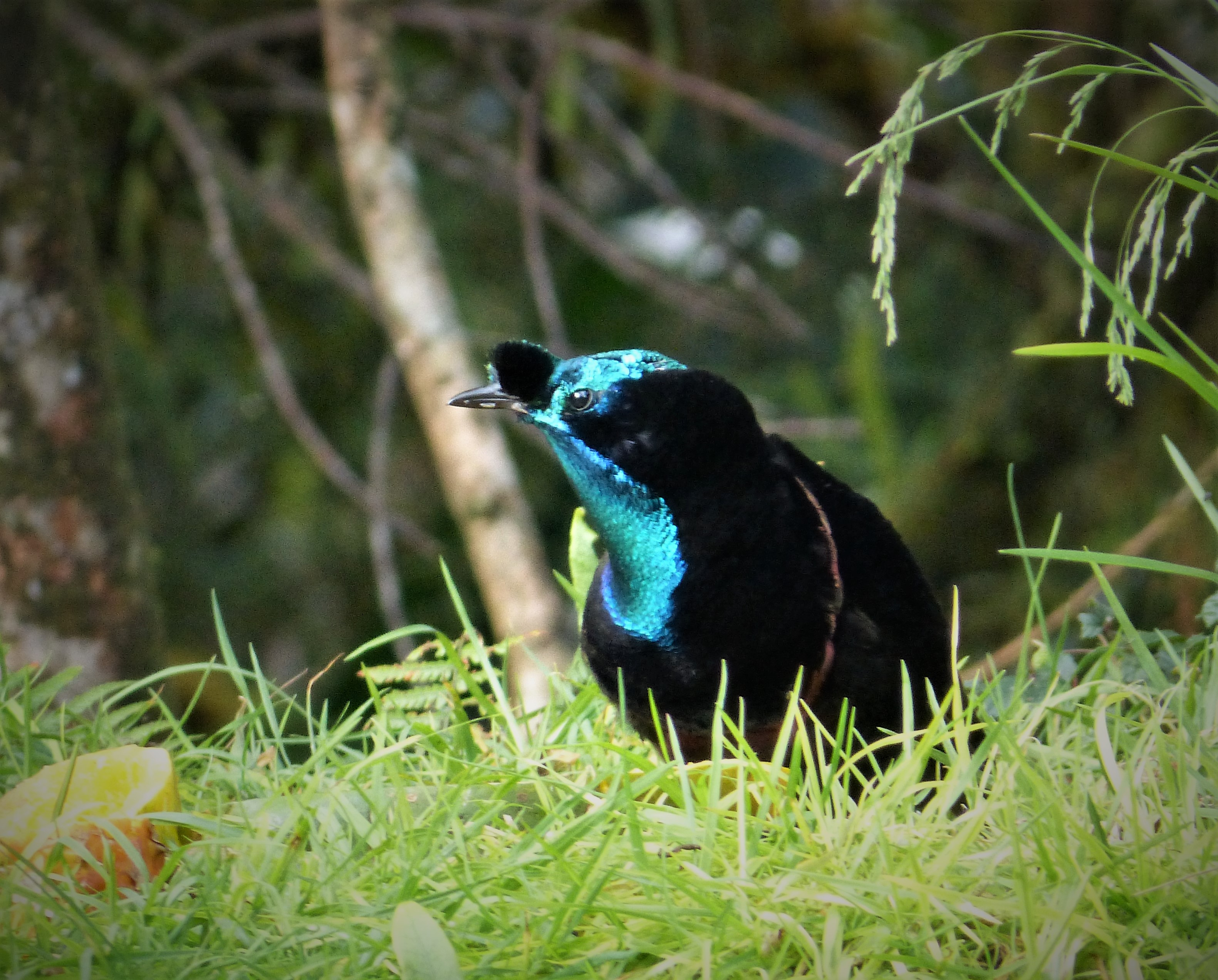
- Adult male
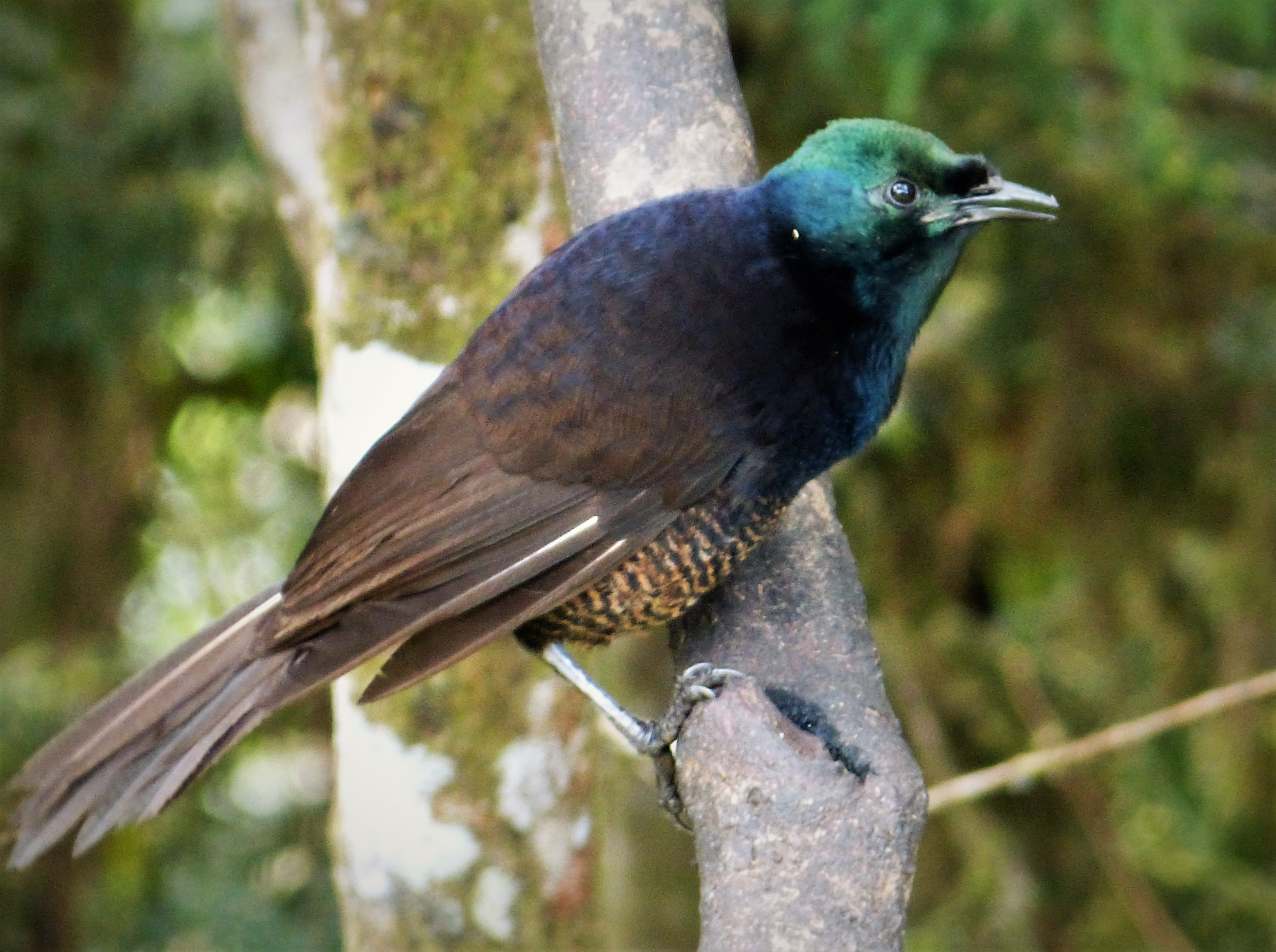
- Adult female

Conservation status
- Least Concern (IUCN 3.1)

Scientific classification
- Kingdom: Animalia
- Phylum: Chordata
- Class: Aves
- Order: Passeriformes
- Family: Paradisaeidae
- Genus: Astrapia
- Species: A. mayeri

Binomial name
- Astrapia mayeri Stonor, 1939

= Ribbon-tailed astrapia =

Species of bird

The ribbon-tailed astrapia, also known as Shaw Mayer's astrapia (Astrapia mayeri), is a species of bird-of-paradise.

The ribbon-tailed astrapia is distributed and endemic to subalpine forests in western part of the central highlands of Papua New Guinea. Like many other ornamental birds-of-paradise, the male is polygamous. The ribbon-tailed astrapia is the most recently discovered bird-of-paradise.

The ribbon-tailed astrapia is listed as Least Concern on the IUCN Red List of Threatened Species. It is listed on Appendix II of CITES. The long tails of male birds add to the threat, being as though the tail makes it difficult for the species to escape from natural predators.

The scientific name commemorates the great naturalist and New Guinea explorer Fred Shaw Mayer, who was believed to have discovered the bird in 1938. However, it is now believed that explorer Jack Hides discovered the bird, while Mayer became interested in it later.

== Description ==
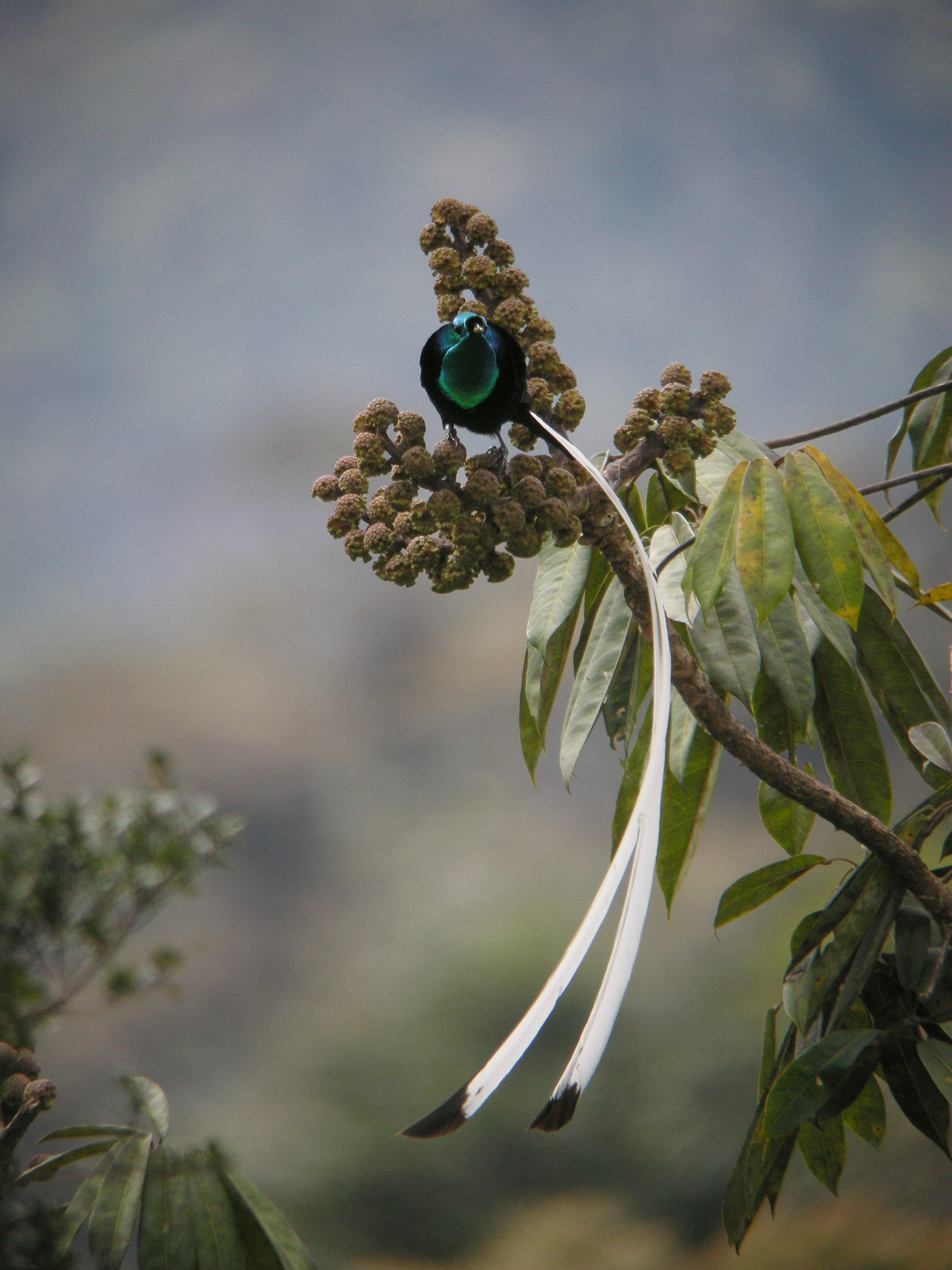
Male with long tail feathers

The ribbon-tailed astrapia is medium-sized, up to 32 cm long (without including the tail of the male, which can be over 1 metre). Male ribbon-tailed astrapia are generally around 125 cm whereas females are around 35 cm. The body of males are velvet black. The male has an iridescent olive green and bronze plumage, and is adorned with ornamental "ball" plume above its bill and two extremely long, ribbon-like white tail feathers. The female has a much duller brown and black body with an iridescent head. Unlike males, females do not have the long white tails. Hybrids between this species and the Princess Stephanie's astrapia, in the small area where their ranges overlap, have been named Barnes's astrapia.

One of the most spectacular birds-of-paradise, the male ribbon-tailed astrapia has the longest tail feathers in relation to body size of any bird, over three times the length of its body.
