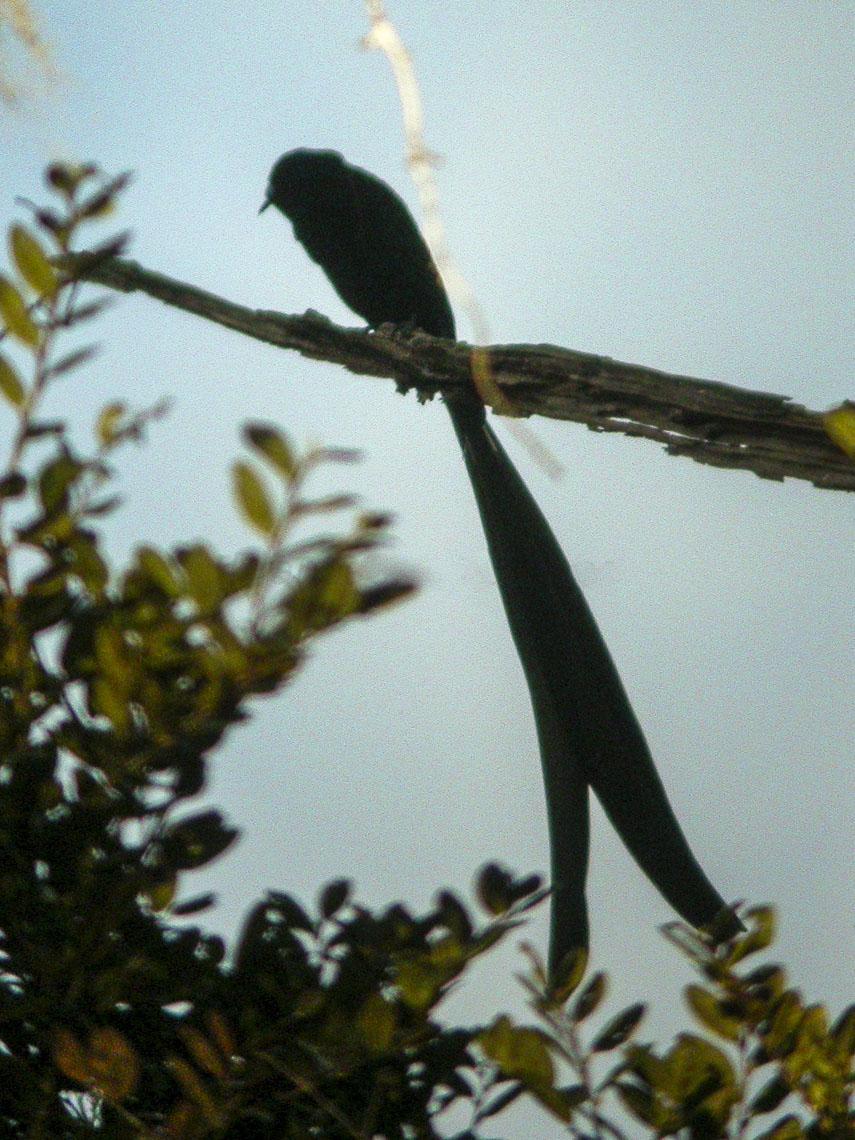

Conservation status
- Least Concern (IUCN 3.1)

Scientific classification
- Kingdom: Animalia
- Phylum: Chordata
- Class: Aves
- Order: Passeriformes
- Family: Paradisaeidae
- Genus: Astrapia
- Species: A. stephaniae

Binomial name
- Astrapia stephaniae (Finsch & A.B. Meyer, 1886)

= Stephanie's astrapia =

Princess Stephanie's astrapia

Species of bird

Stephanie's astrapia (Astrapia stephaniae), also known as Princess Stephanie's astrapia, is a species of bird-of-paradise of the family Paradisaeidae, native to the Bird's Tail Peninsula (Papua New Guinea). This species was first described by Carl Hunstein in 1884.

A common species throughout its range, Princess Stephanie's astrapia is listed as Least Concern on the IUCN Red List of Threatened Species. It is listed on Appendix II of CITES.

Hybrids between this species and the ribbon-tailed astrapia, in the small area where their ranges overlap, have been named Barnes's astrapia.

== Etymology ==
The scientific name of Stephanie's astrapia is Astrapia stephaniae. Its genus name, Astrapia, means "flash of lightning", referring to the brilliant iridescent plumage present in some form on all astapias. Its specific name, stephaniae, honors Princess Stephanie of Belgium, the wife of Crown Prince Rudolf of Austria, who also was honored in the Blue bird-of-paradise's scientific name, rudolphi. Upon discovery, its former genus name was Astarchia, meaning "Queen of Stars" (a nickname for the moon) or "Star chief".

== Description ==
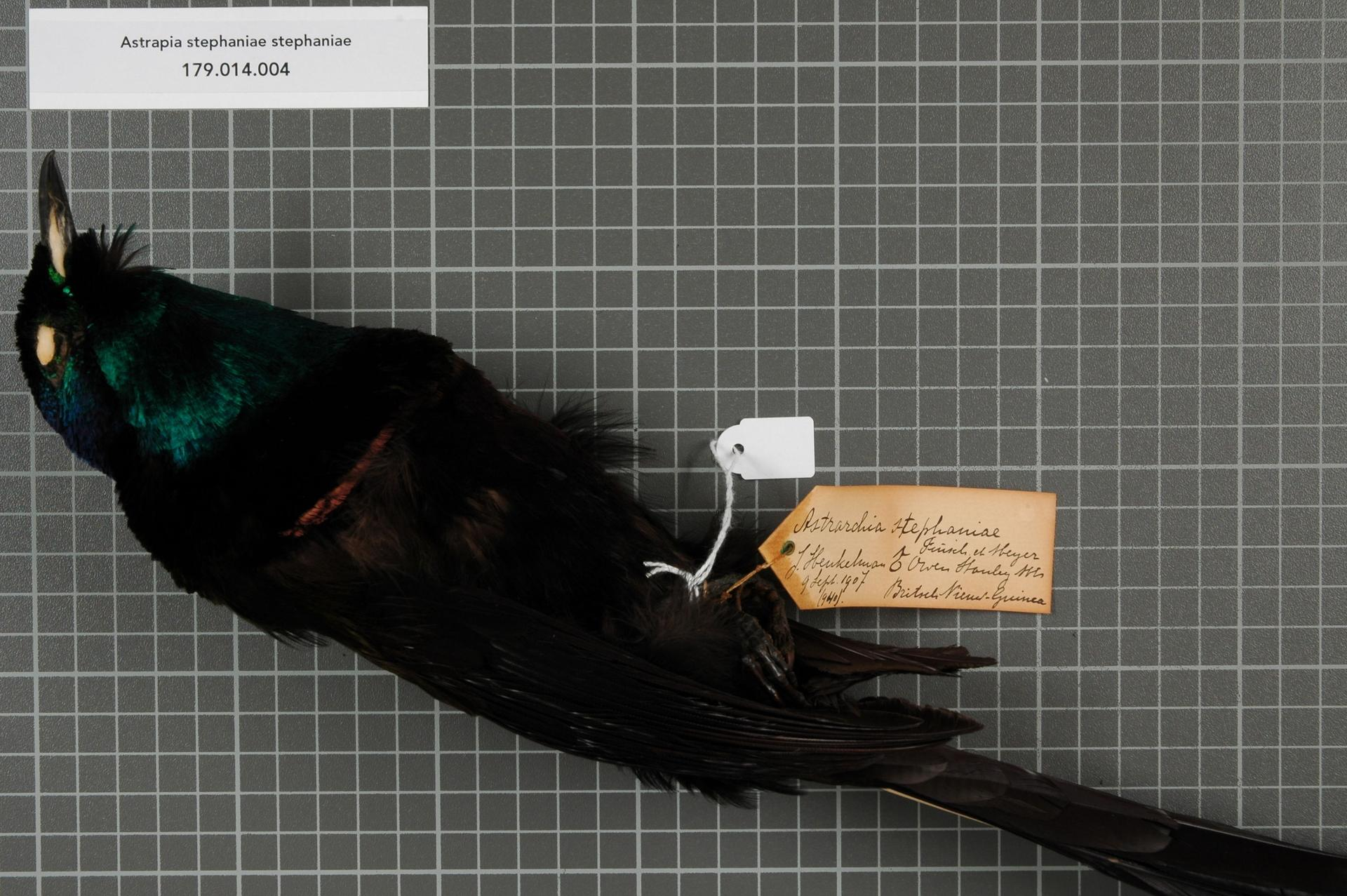
Male Stephanie's astrapia specimen at the Naturalis Biodiversity Center

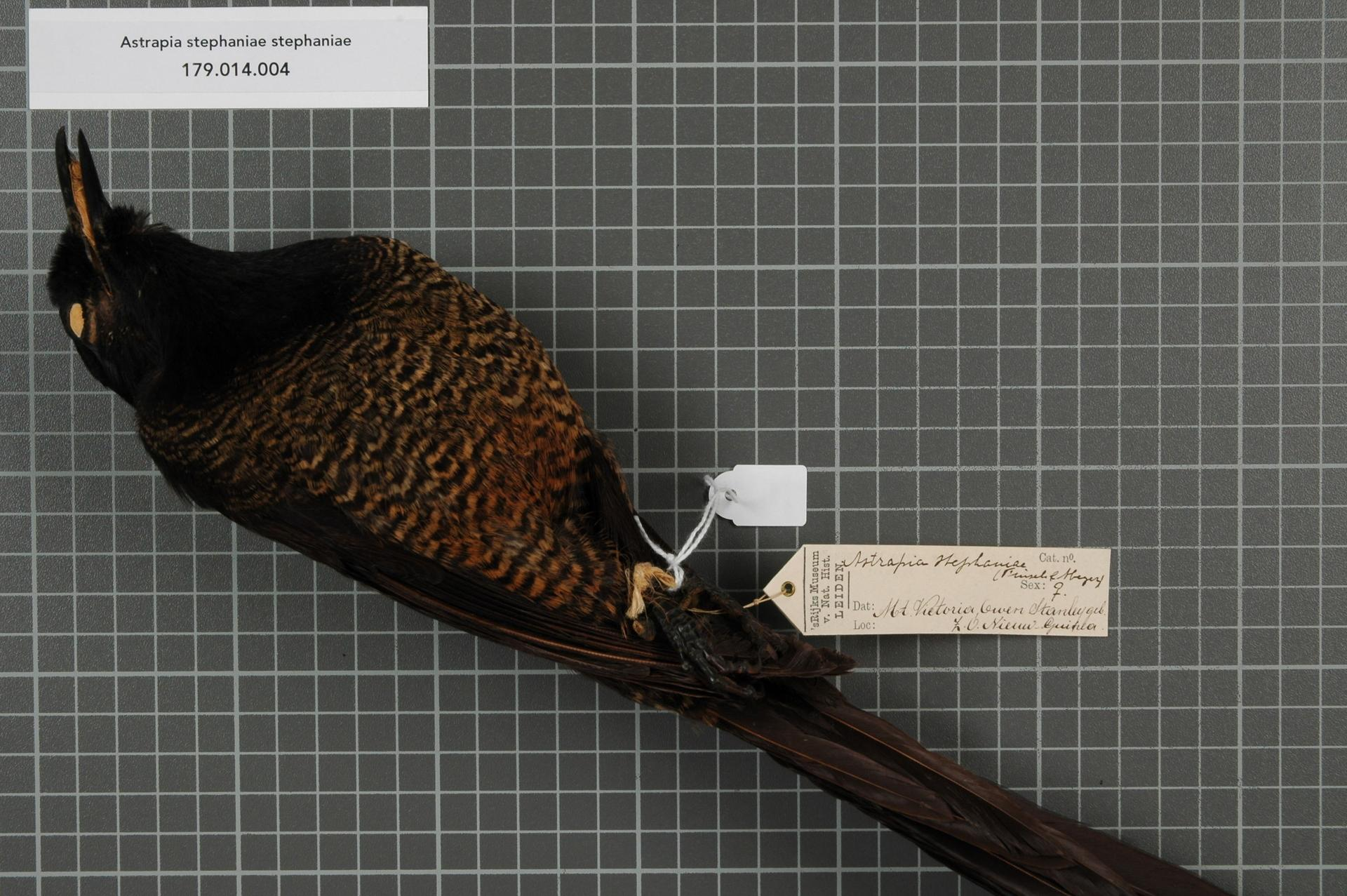
Female Stephanie's astrapia specimen

Stephanie's astrapia is a most distinctive bird-of-paradise, and extremely unmistakable to recognize. The males of this species reach around 84 cm (33 inches) in length, and a considerable portion of its length comes from the long, 47 cm (18 inches), glossy, black central tail feathers, which almost compete with the exaggerated, white tail feathers of the male Ribbon-tailed astrapias. The upper head of the male is an iridescent greenish-blue, shading to indigo blue in the back; the chin to the upper breast section is an iridescent aqua to greenish-blue, though the throat area is usually a dark, shaded tint depending on the angle of view. Below the iridescent upper breast section, dense, black feathers lie beneath it, and underneath the dense feathers lies a narrow, iridescent, coppery-red to orange-reddish band. The rest of the underparts are an iridescent, dull coppery-red to black (again, depending on the angle of view). The upperparts, namely the mantle (or back), are a dull light-green, but may appear brownish or black in some views. The upperwing is black, with a conspicuous purple gloss, the underwing is a lighter shade of black. The most distinctive feature, the extremely exaggerated central tail plumes, are wholly black with a purple gloss, and white rachides. The feet are grey-blackish, the bill is blackish, the mouth is pale green, and the eyes are dark brown. The female, as typical in the family Paradisaeidae, is drastically different from the male. She is mostly dark brown with a dark black-bluish head and upperbreast, black-barred, cinnamon-brown underparts, and a reasonably long, blackish tail.

=== Hybridization ===
In the places where they are sympatric, Stephanie's astrapia rather frequently hybridizes with the ribbon-tailed astrapia. The hybrid offspring has been called "Barnes's astrapia". This form of astrapia has extremely long central rectrices that have variable amounts of black and white, and are sometimes seen in a mysterious, spiky shape near the end of the tail.

== Ecology and behavior ==
=== Feeding ===
Stephanie's astrapia, like a majority of its relatives, are shown to be predominantly frugivorous, particularly favoring members of the genus Heptapleurum. Animal prey takes up the other portion of the diet. Recorded prey includes frogs, insects, spiders, and some skink species. The birds typically feed alone, occasionally associating with other Paradisaeids, like the Brown sicklebill, and other bird species.

=== Courtship and breeding ===
The breeding period typically occurs anywhere from May to July, though reproduction is viable to happen year-round. Male Stephanie's astrapias are polygynous, exhibiting lekking behavior; the males call to attract females to their display perches. There may be as many as 5 birds displaying, though three is more typical. The display consists of the males hopping from each other's perch, swapping places, and chasing the female from perch to perch. The female tends to all nest and chick duties by herself, like most other birds-of-paradise species.

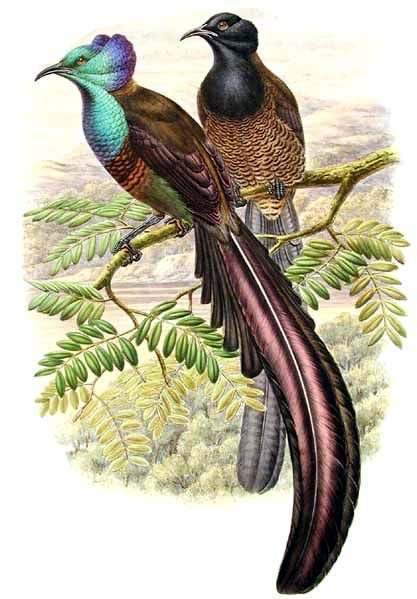
Male (left) and female

== Subspecies and taxonomy ==
Belonging to the genus Astrapia, Stephanie's astrapia is most closely related to the ribbon-tailed astrapia, and the two share very similar features, though Stephanie's lacks the conspicuous bobble of feathers found on the ribbon-tailed. The genus Astrapia falls into a clade with the genera Epimachus and Paradigalla, though they are closer to the genus Paradigalla. Stephanie's astrapia has been considered to have three subspecies, the third being race ducalis, but that race is synonymized with the nominate. There are currently two recognized subspecies:

- Astrapia stephaniae feminina — Schrader and Bismarck ranges to Sepik-Wahgi divide
- Astrapia stephaniae stephaniae — Owen Stanley Range

des monts Doma et Hagen jusqu'à la chaîne Owen Stanley, en passant par le mont Michael et la chaîne Herzog). Une race supplémentaire, A. s. ducalis, vivant dans les monts Herzog

== Status and conservation ==
A common species throughout its range, Princess Stephanie's astrapia is listed as Least Concern on the IUCN Red List of Threatened Species. It is listed on Appendix II of CITES.
