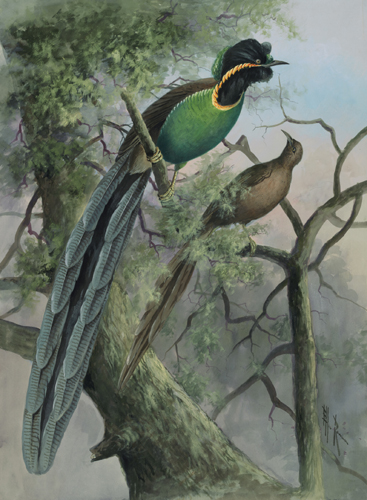
- Illustration of Astrapia nigra, male (front) and female (center).

Conservation status
- Least Concern (IUCN 3.1)

Scientific classification
- Kingdom: Animalia
- Phylum: Chordata
- Class: Aves
- Order: Passeriformes
- Family: Paradisaeidae
- Genus: Astrapia
- Species: A. nigra

Binomial name
- Astrapia nigra (Gmelin, JF, 1788)

= Arfak astrapia =

Arfak Astrapia

Species of bird

The Arfak astrapia (Astrapia nigra) is a species of astrapia, a group of birds found in the birds-of-paradise family Paradiseidae.

== Taxonomy ==
The Arfak astrapia was formally described in 1788 by the German naturalist Johann Friedrich Gmelin in his revised and expanded edition of Carl Linnaeus's Systema Naturae. He placed it with the birds of paradise in the genus Paradisea (now spelled Paradisaea) and coined the binomial name Paradisea nigra. Gmelin based his description on the "Gorget paradise bird" that had been described in 1782 by the English ornithologist John Latham in his book A General Synopsis of Birds. Lathan had examined a specimen in the collection of the naturalist Joseph Banks. The type location is the Arfak Mountains in the Bird's Head Peninsula of northwest New Guinea. The Arfak astrapia is now placed in the genus Astrapia that was introduced in 1816 by the French ornithologist Louis Pierre Vieillot. The genus name is derived from Ancient Greek astrapios or astrapaios meaning "of lightning". The specific epithet nigra is from Latin niger meaning "black". The species is monotypic: no subspecies are recognised.

== Description ==
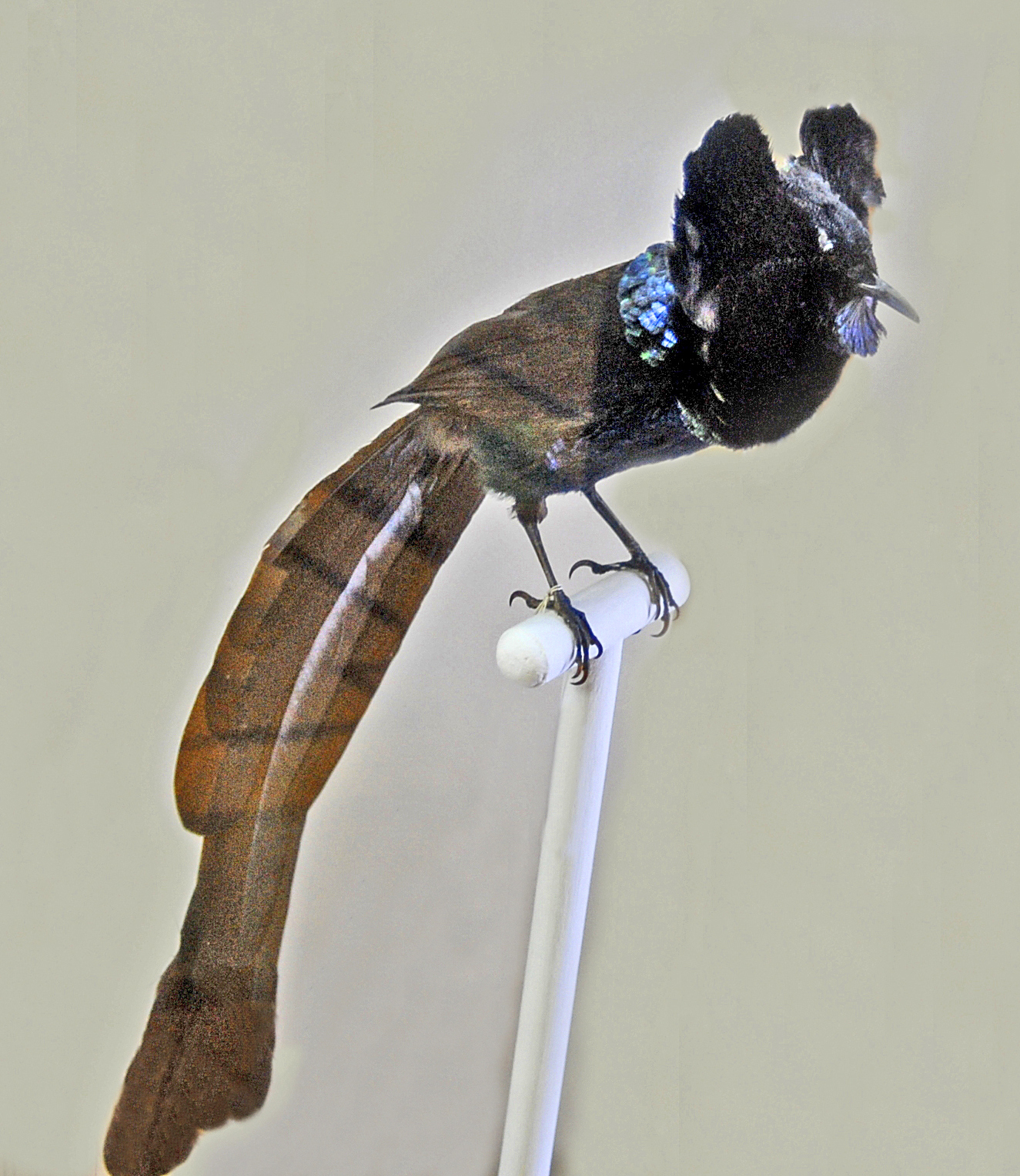
Astrapia nigra. Museum specimen

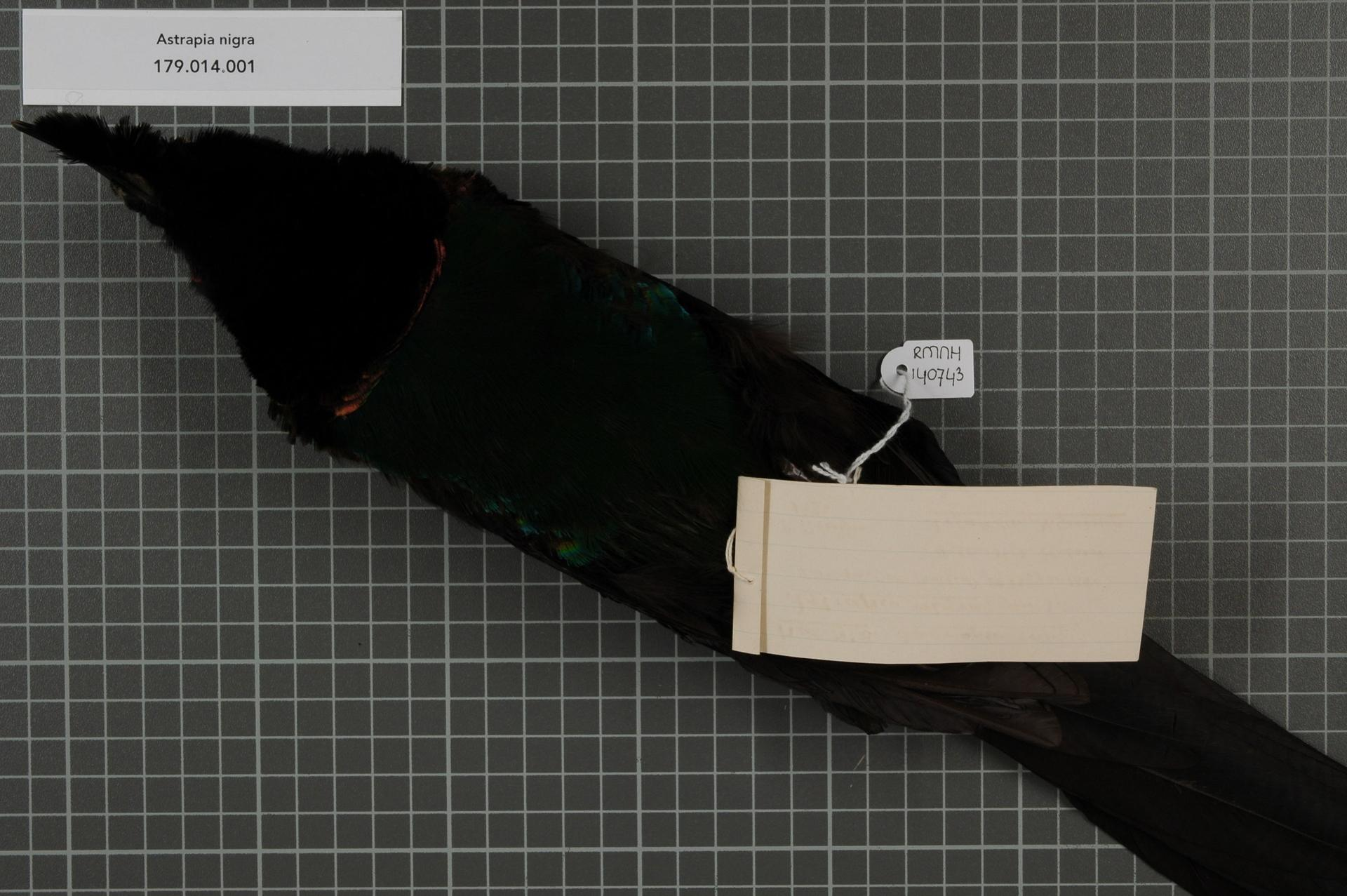
Male Arfak Astrapia specimen at the Naturalis Biodiversity Center.

The Arfak astrapia is the third largest of its genus, being approximately 76 cm (30 in) long, including the tail. The male has a black head with a bluish-purple sheen, or iridescence, an elongated jet-black nape crests extending up along the sides of the up to the eyes on each side, a shiny, metallic greenish-yellow cape from the mantle up to the nape, very black, dense and elongated upper breast feathers, and an almost exaggeratedly long tail almost two times the length of its body. The female is less appealing, being dark brown over most of its body and a blackish head, and sporting much shorter tail feathers. The female is also exceptionally shorter than the male.

Levaillant of France described this bird as L'Incomparable or Incomparable bird-of-paradise.

== Distribution ==
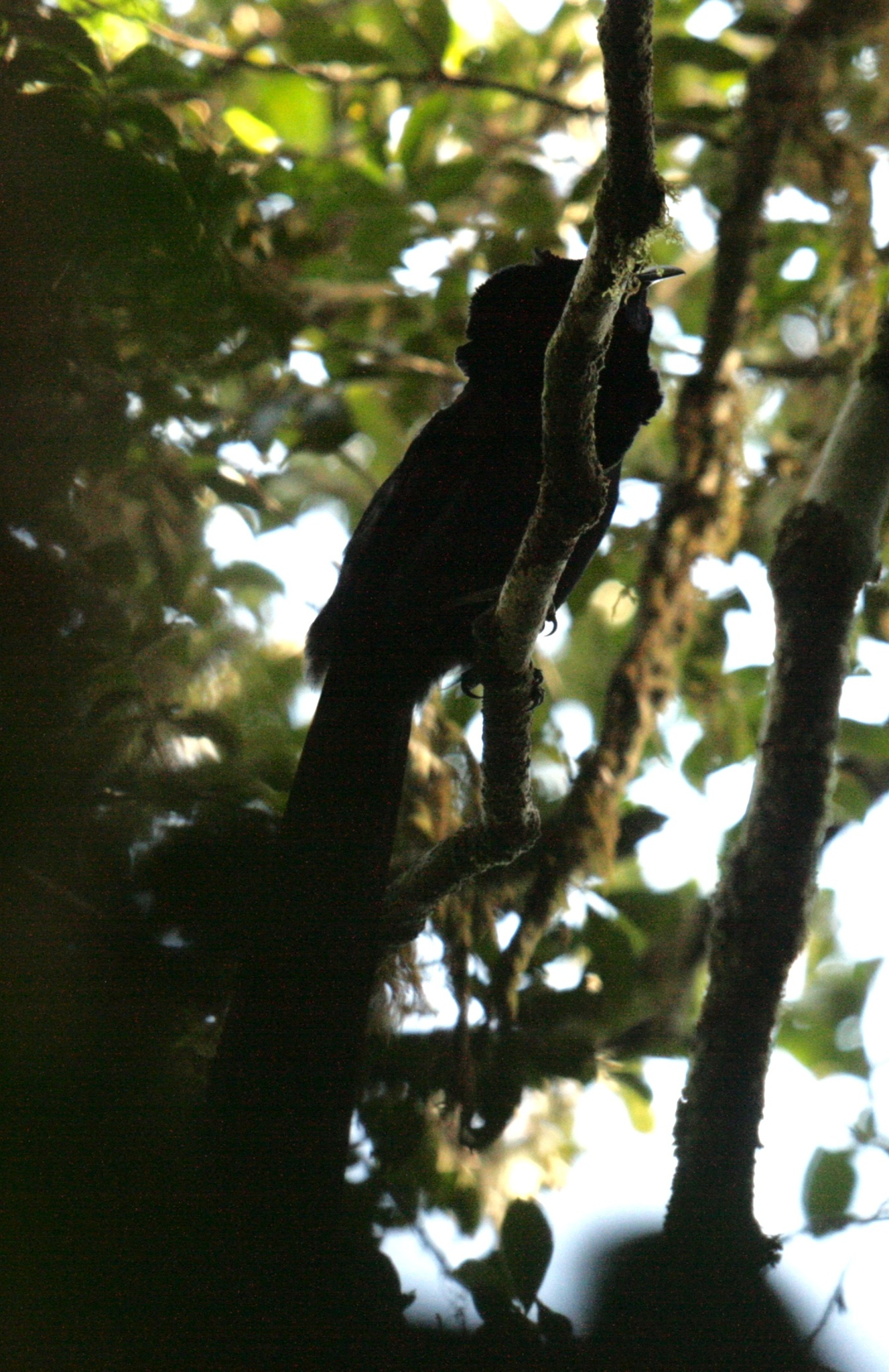
Live male

Astrapia nigra is endemic to the Arfak Mountains in Vogelkop Peninsula, West Papua.

== Behaviour and ecology ==
The habits of the Arfak astrapia are very little known. The birds are found mostly in cloud forests at 1,700 to 2,250 m (5,580 to 7,380 ft) at the apex of the Arfak Mountains. Foraging habits observed include the birds probing fruits, mostly pandanus fruits, off of moss and epiphytes in the montane canopy. Arthropods also recorded in the diet. Breeding habits mostly unknown; female definitely builds the nests and tend the chicks, as with most other birds-of-paradise, though the exact rearing period is unknown. All that is known about the courtship display is that the males display on a branch upside-down with their nape crests spread out, dense breast feathers flared up, and tail standing vertically upwards above the branch. No other information.

== Conservation status ==
Protected by its geographical isolation and undisturbed forests home, the Arfak astrapia is evaluated as Least Concern on the IUCN Red List of Threatened Species. It is listed on Appendix II of CITES.
