= Lionel William Wiglesworth =

Lionel William Wiglesworth (February 13, 1865 – June 7, 1901) was an English ornithologist who studied birds of Southeast Asia and Polynesia. Wiglesworth published The Birds of Celebes and the Neighboring Islands in 1898 with Adolf Bernhard Meyer. Together, they described several new bird species, including the dark-eared myza (Myza celebensis) and the Banggai fruit dove (Ptilinopus subgularis).
