= Adolf Bernhard Meyer =

German anthropologist, ornithologist, entomologist and herpetologist

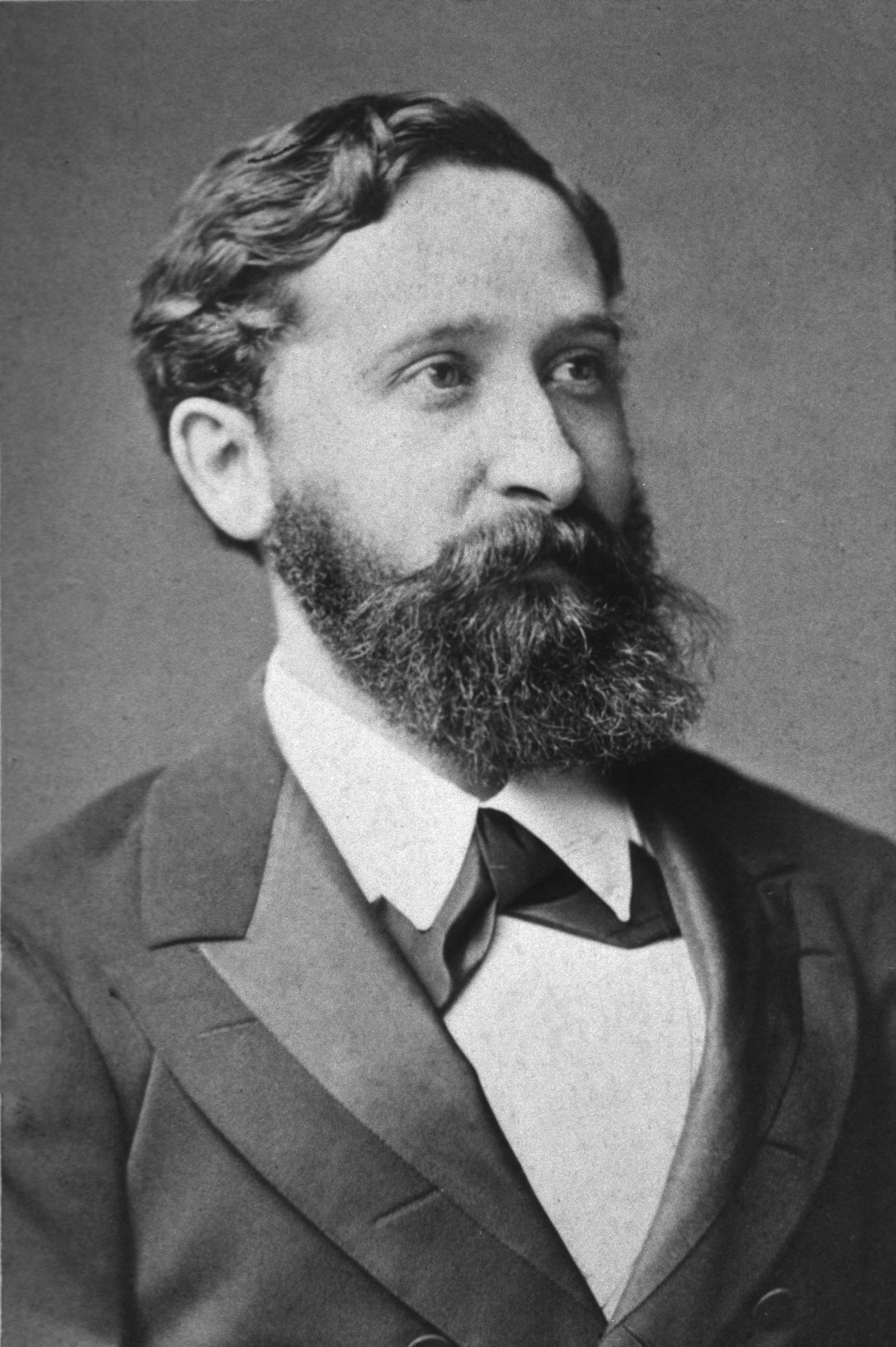
- Born: 11 October 1840; Hamburg, Germany
- Died: 22 August 1911 (aged 70); Dresden, Germany
- Education: University of Göttingen; University of Vienna; University of Zürich; Humboldt University of Berlin
- Notable work: The Birds of Celebes and the Neighbouring Islands
- Spouse: Wilhelmine Meyer
- Scientific career
- Fields: anthropology; ornithology; entomology; herpetology
- Workplaces: Königlich Zoologisches und Anthropologisch-Ethnographisches Museum

Signature
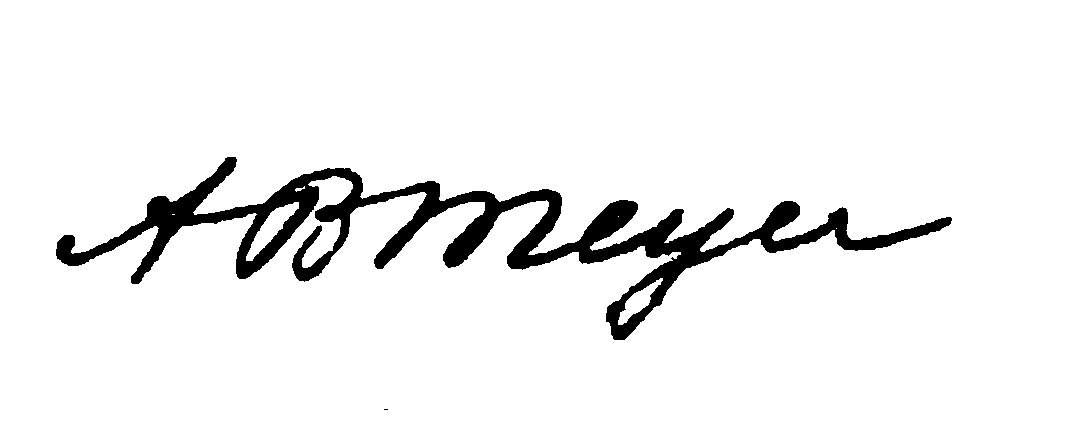

Adolf Bernhard Meyer (11 October 1840, Hamburg – 22 August 1911, Dresden) was a German anthropologist, ornithologist, entomologist, and herpetologist. He served for nearly thirty years as director of the Königlich Zoologisches und Anthropologisch-Ethnographisches Museum (now the natural history museum or Museum für Tierkunde Dresden) in Dresden. He worked on comparative anatomy and appreciated the ideas of evolution, and influenced many German scientists by translating into German the 1858 papers by Darwin and Wallace which first proposed evolution by natural selection. Influenced by the writings of Wallace with whom he interacted, he travelled to Southeast Asia, and collected specimens and recorded his observations from the region.

== Biography ==
Meyer was born in a wealthy Jewish family in Hamburg as Aron Baruch Meyer, and was educated at the universities of Göttingen, Vienna, Zürich and Berlin. He became director of the Anthropological and Ethnographic Museum in Dresden in 1874 and continued in that position until his retirement in 1905. He studied medicine in Zurich and published a thesis on electrical stimulation of the nerves. In 1870 he translated the works of Charles Darwin and Alfred Russel Wallace into German. Enamoured by Wallace's travelogues, he travelled in the East Indies at the end of the nineteenth century. He collected numerous specimens. Meyer's East Indies bird collection and beetles and butterflies collected in Celebes and New Guinea are in Staatliches Museum für Tierkunde Dresden. The museum was destroyed during the Allied bombing of Dresden, 13–15 February 1945, and many specimens were lost. In 1874 he succeeded Heinrich Gottlieb Ludwig Reichenbach as director at the same museum. Among his inventions were the "Dresden Case" made of iron and glass that he designed to store specimens. It is believed that he held the post until 1904 when anti-semitism led to his suspension. He was forced to resign in 1906 and his position was taken by Arnold Jacobi. He also studied amphibians and reptiles, describing several new species of lizards endemic to New Guinea. In addition to birds he made a study on primates. He described Tarsius sangirensis, the Sangihe tarsier, a small primate that he found in Indonesia in 1897. His knowledge of English allowed him to collaborate with many researchers such as L. W. Wiglesworth with whom he wrote The Birds of Celebes and the Neighbouring Islands (1898). His two volume studies on the skeletons of birds was dedicated to Professors Max Fürbringer and Henri Milne-Edwards.

The brown sicklebill (Epimachus meyeri) was named after him when the species was first recorded in 1884. He published a classification of birds and named and described several new species, among them Queen Carola's parotia (Parotia carolae), Princess Stephanie's astrapia (Astrapia stephaniae), the red-capped flowerpecker (Dicaeum geelvinkianum), and the takahē (Notornis hochstetteri, now Porphyrio hochstetteri ).

Meyer is commemorated in the scientific name of a species of lizard, Typhlosaurus meyeri.

== Writings ==
- Abbildungen von Vogelskeletten (1879–95). Volume 1, Volume 2. (in German).
- Publikationen des königlichenethnographischen Museums zu Dresden (1881–1903). (in German).
- Album von Philippinentypen (1885–1904). (in German).
- The Birds of Celebes (1885).
- The Distribution of the Negritos (1899).
- Studies of the Museum (of Natural History) and kindred Institutions of New York, etc. (1905).
- Amerikanische Bibliotheken und ihre Bestrebungen (1906). (in German).
- Die Römerstadt Agunt bei Lienz in Tirol (1908). (in German).
