= Eastern parotia =

Scientific classification
- Kingdom: Animalia
- Phylum: Chordata
- Class: Aves
- Order: Passeriformes
- Family: Paradisaeidae
- Genus: Parotia
- Species: P. helenae

Binomial name
- Parotia helenae De Vis, 1897

Species of bird

The eastern parotia (Parotia helenae), also known as Helena's parotia, is a medium-sized passerine of the bird-of-paradise family, Paradisaeidae, endemic to mountain forests of the Bird's Tail Peninsula (Papua New Guinea). It is approximately 27 cm (11 in) long.

The scientific name honors Princess Helena Augusta Victoria, the third daughter of Queen Victoria of the United Kingdom.

As with other species of Parotia, the male is polygamous and performs spectacular courtship display in the forest ground. The clutch contains 1, maybe occasionally 2 eggs; one that was studied was 38.4 x 27.8 mm in size (Mackay 1990). It eats mainly fruit, seeds and arthropods.

A common species throughout its limited range, it is listed on Appendix II of CITES.

== Description ==
Its appearance resembles Lawes's parotia, of which it is sometimes considered a subspecies. It differs in the male frontal crest's and the female's dorsal plumage colors. The male has an iridescent golden green breast shield, elongated black plumes, three erectile spatule head-wires behind each blue iris eye and golden brown nasal tuft feathers. The female is smaller than the male, with brown plumage and black barred below.
