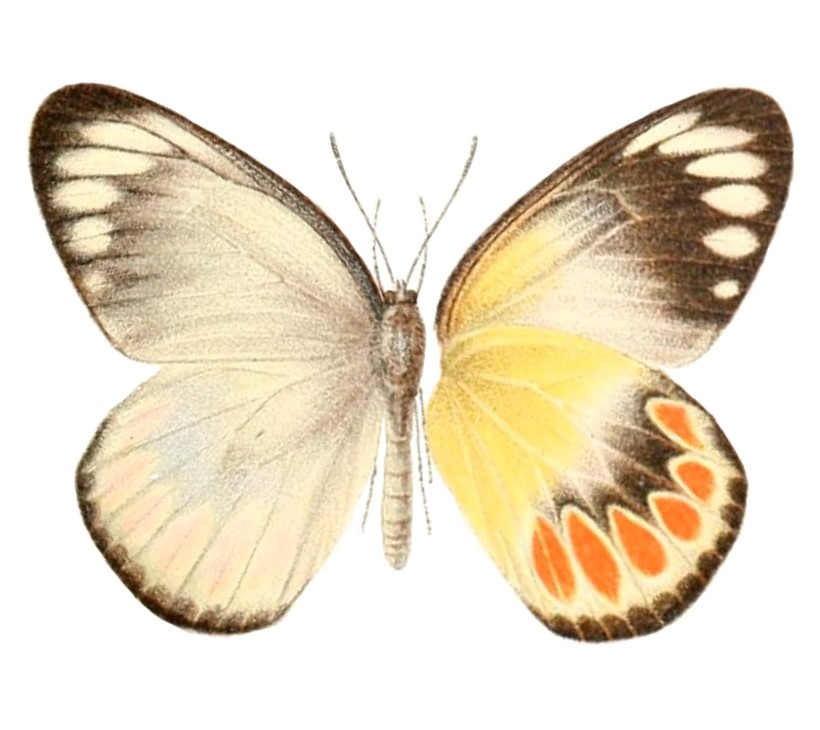
- Delias schoenbergi in Novitates Zoologicae

Scientific classification
- Kingdom: Animalia
- Phylum: Arthropoda
- Clade: Pancrustacea
- Class: Insecta
- Order: Lepidoptera
- Family: Pieridae
- Genus: Delias
- Species: D. schoenbergi

Binomial name
- Delias schoenbergi Rothschild, 1895

Synonyms
- Delias schönbergi Rothschild, 1895

= Delias schoenbergi =

Species of butterfly

Delias schoenbergi is a butterfly in the family Pieridae. It was described by Walter Rothschild in 1895. It is found in the Australasian realm. (Solomon Islands)

== Description ==
Delias schonbergi sp. nov.

Male. — Upperside : white, base powdered with black scales. Forewings, in the apical region, with a row of six white spots inside which the disc is grey; apical margin black. Hindwings with a narrow black margin.

Underside: forewings with basal third yellowish; outer half black, the black area entering the apex of the cell, including six well-defined white subapical markings. Hindwings with basal half yellow; outer half with a submarginal row of six large pear-shaped scarlet patches, each circled with white; disc between costal margin and lower median nervule and the outer margin black.

Female. — Upper side : grey. Forewings with outer half black : a subapical row of white spots, of which the anterior ones are large, the posterior ones small.Hindwings with abdominal margin white, outer margin black, and the disc between the upper discoidal, upper median, and the discocellular nervules greyish black; a submarginal band of large pale pink patches.Underside: similar to the male; the submarginal spots rather larger.

Hal. Bougainville Island, Solomon Islands (Carl Ribbe leg.; types: male in coll. Ribbe, female in Mus. Tring). This species is named after Herr von Schonberg, at the request of the collector.

The wingspan is about 65–70 mm.

== Subspecies ==
- D. s. schoenbergi (Bougainville)
- D. s. choiseuli Rothschild, 1904 (Choiseul)
- D. s. isabellae Rothschild & Jordan, 1901 (Santa Isabel)

== Taxonomy ==
schoenbergi is a member of the hyparete species group.

== Etymology ==
The species is named for Wolf von Schönberg a collector from Naumburg who acquired specimens from the German colonist collector Karl Wahnes in Borneo (1889/90), German New Guinea and the Bismarck Archipelago (1892/1902).
