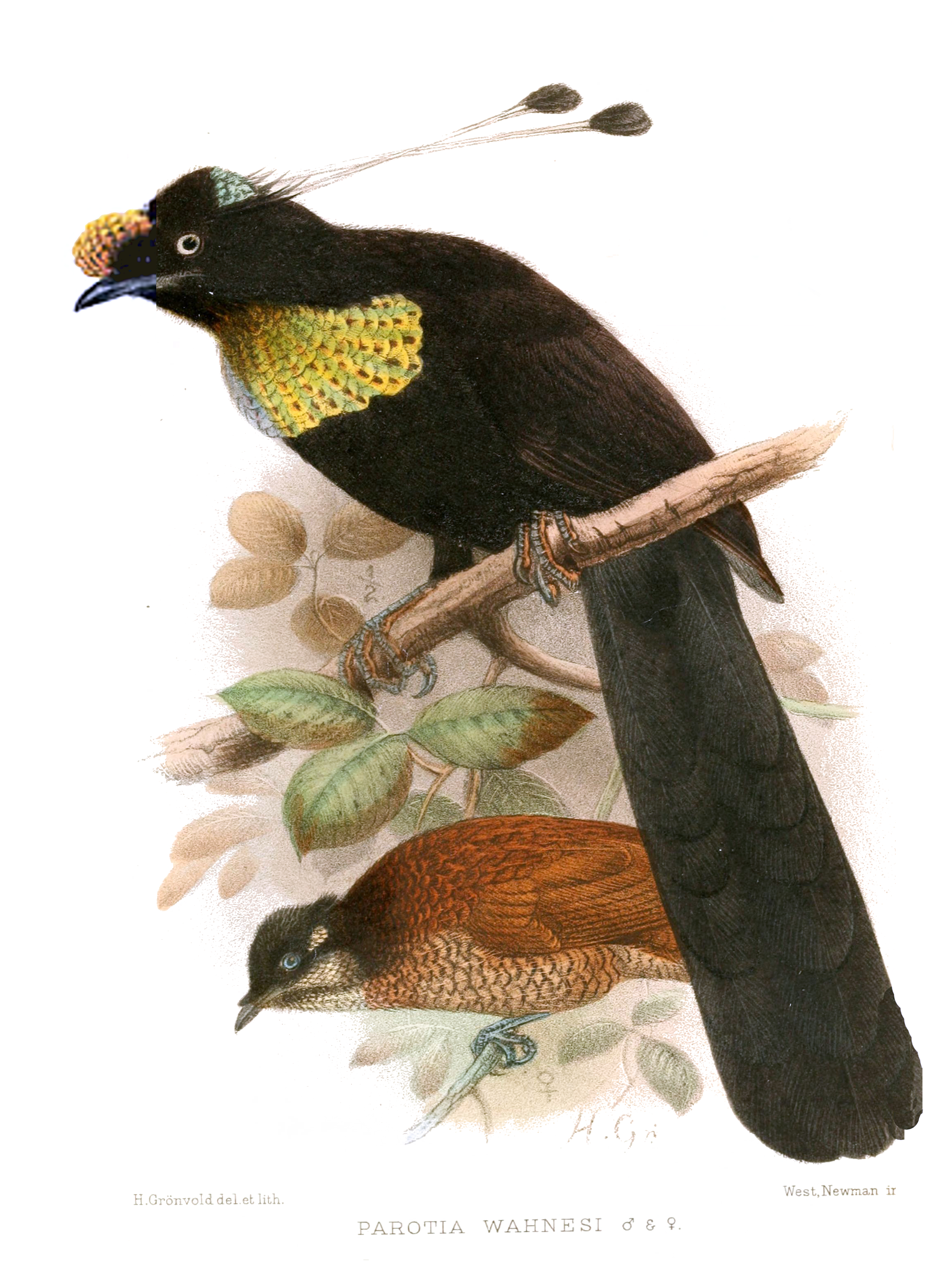
- Male, with female behind

Conservation status
- Near Threatened (IUCN 3.1)

Scientific classification
- Kingdom: Animalia
- Phylum: Chordata
- Class: Aves
- Order: Passeriformes
- Family: Paradisaeidae
- Genus: Parotia
- Species: P. wahnesi

Binomial name
- Parotia wahnesi Rothschild, 1906

= Wahnes's parotia =

Species of bird

Female in Morobe, Papua New Guinea

Wahnes's parotia (Parotia wahnesi) is a medium-sized passerine of the bird-of-paradise family (Paradisaeidae). This species is distributed and endemic to the mountain forests of Huon Peninsula and Adelbert Mountains, northeast Papua New Guinea. The diet consists mainly of fruits and arthropods.

The name honors the German naturalist Carl Wahnes, who collected in New Guinea.

Wahnes's parotia is evaluated as Near Threatened on the IUCN Red List of Threatened Species. It is listed on Appendix II of CITES; its threat classification is C2a(1). As of 2022, there were an estimated 5,000 – 15,000 mature individuals, and the population is believed to be decreasing.

== Description ==
The male has an iridescent yellow-green breast shield, elongated black plumes, three erectile spatule head wires behind each eye, coppery-bronzed nasal tuft feathers and long, wedge-shaped tail feathers. The female is a rich brown bird with blackish head. It is approximately 43 cm long.

== Breeding ==
Little is known about its life and habits. The male is polygamous and performs a spectacular courtship dance in the forest ground.

The clutch probably contains 1, maybe 2 eggs. These are about 40 x 26 mm and have a pale cream base color. They have a varying pattern of streaks and dots, dense at the large end and very sparse on the other, and consisting of a lower gray and an upper tan layer with some overlap.(Mackay 1990)
