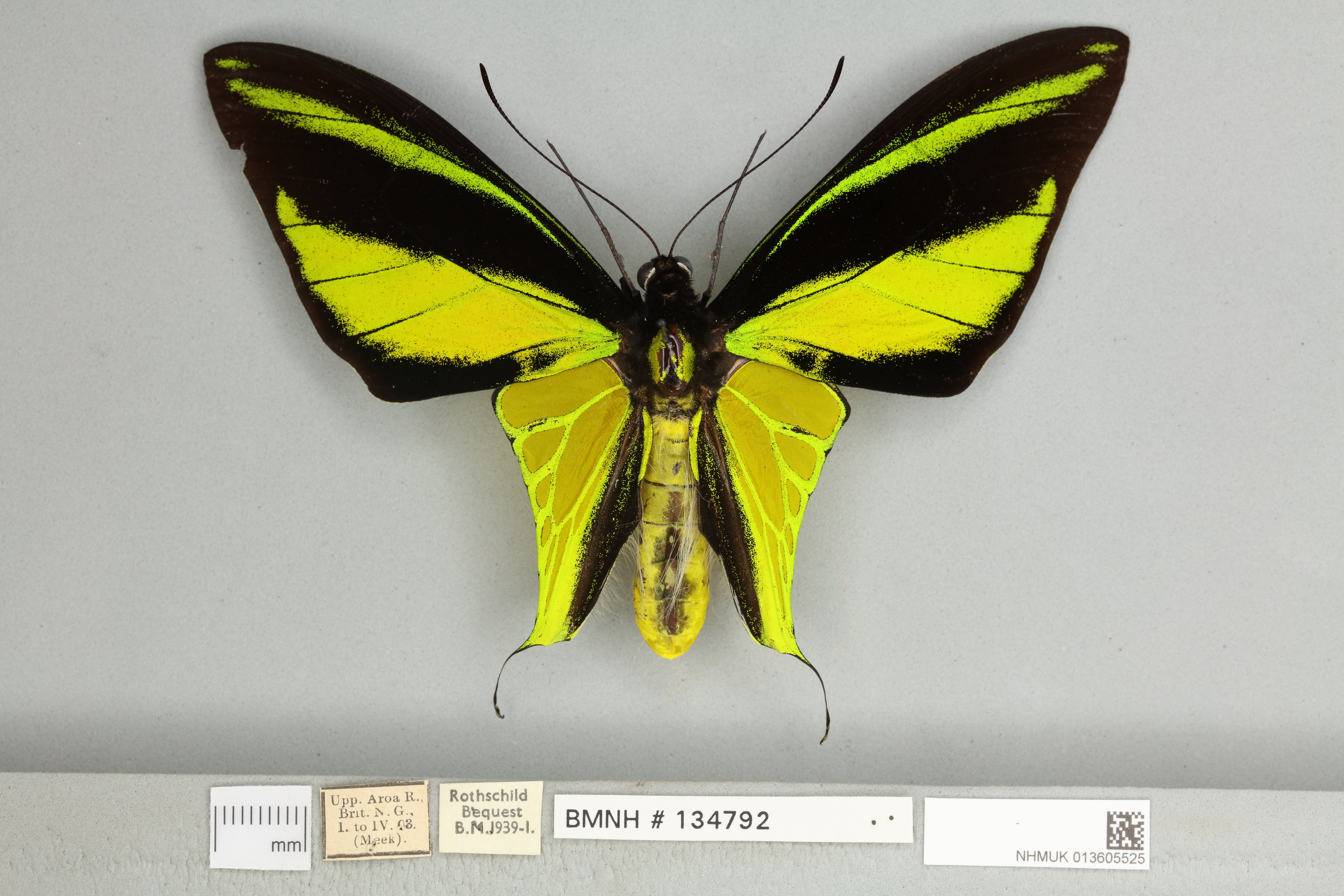
- Male, upperside
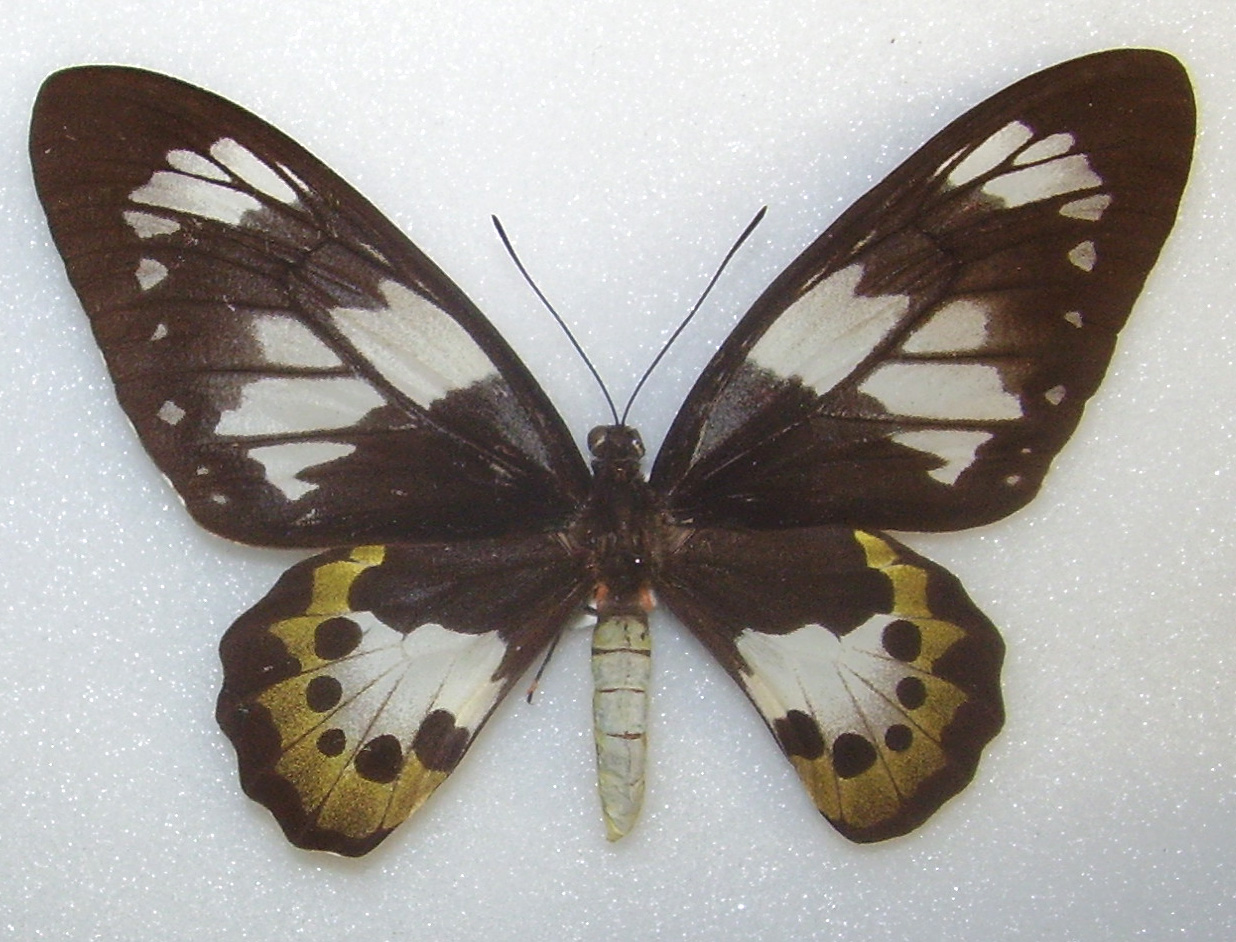
- Female, upperside

Conservation status
- Near Threatened (IUCN 3.1)
- CITES Appendix II

Scientific classification
- Kingdom: Animalia
- Phylum: Arthropoda
- Clade: Pancrustacea
- Class: Insecta
- Order: Lepidoptera
- Family: Papilionidae
- Genus: Ornithoptera
- Species: O. meridionalis

Binomial name
- Ornithoptera meridionalis (Rothschild, 1897)

Synonyms
- Troides meridionalis Rothschild, 1897

= Ornithoptera meridionalis =

Southern tailed birdwing

Species of birdwing butterfly

Ornithoptera meridionalis, the southern tailed birdwing, is the smallest species of the genus Ornithoptera. It is known from a handful of localities in southeast Papua New Guinea (O. meridionalis meridionalis) and several localities along the south coast of Irian Jaya (O. meridionalis tarunggarensis).

The specific ephiphet meridionalis, means southern.

== History ==
O. meridionalis was first collected by Albert Stewart Meek near Samarai, Milne Bay Province, Papua New Guinea. The holotype is a female held in the British Museum (Natural History) collection. Meek was funded in his expeditions by the scientific author of this species, Lord Walter Rothschild.

== Distribution and habitat ==
It is strictly a lowland species, favouring primary rainforest. A very few specimens have also been collected at altitude in Irian Jaya by Jan Pasternak, however these specimens were reared from immature stages and emerged crippled (Deslisle, 2004), suggesting that high altitude forests are not favoured habitats. O. meridionalis has also recently been found in close promimity to its sister species, Ornithoptera paradisea, near Timika in Irian Jaya (Gotts, 2003). Host plants for this species are all vines of the genus Pararistolochia (Aristolochiaceae), including the species P. meridionalis in Papua New Guinea. Larvae typically ringbark the host before pupating on nearby plants.

O. meridionalis is classified as Near Threatened in Threatened Swallowtail Butterflies of the World: The IUCN Red Data Book and is threatened by habitat loss (rainforest clearing), especially in parts of Papua New Guinea. For example, a well known locality at the Brown River has now been destroyed by logging. There are a few villages farming this species in Papua New Guinea. Most commercially available specimens are now sourced from Irian Jaya and are extremely valuable (prices may exceed US$1000 per pair). Collecting has a negligible effect on population sizes provided the original habitat is left undisturbed.

== Description ==
Males of O. meridionalis are remarkable in that they have an extremely small amount of wing area relative to its rather bulky body. In particular, the hindwings are very reduced and tetragonal in shape, tapering into a single pair of filamentous tails that are easily broken. The only other tailed Ornithoptera is Ornithoptera paradisea. Specimens of this sex are weak fliers and tend to spend most of the day resting. Females are more normally proportioned and have a flight characteristic more typical of the genus Ornithoptera. Both sexes have been recorded feeding at flowers in numbers early in the morning.

== Description in Rhopalocera Exotica ==
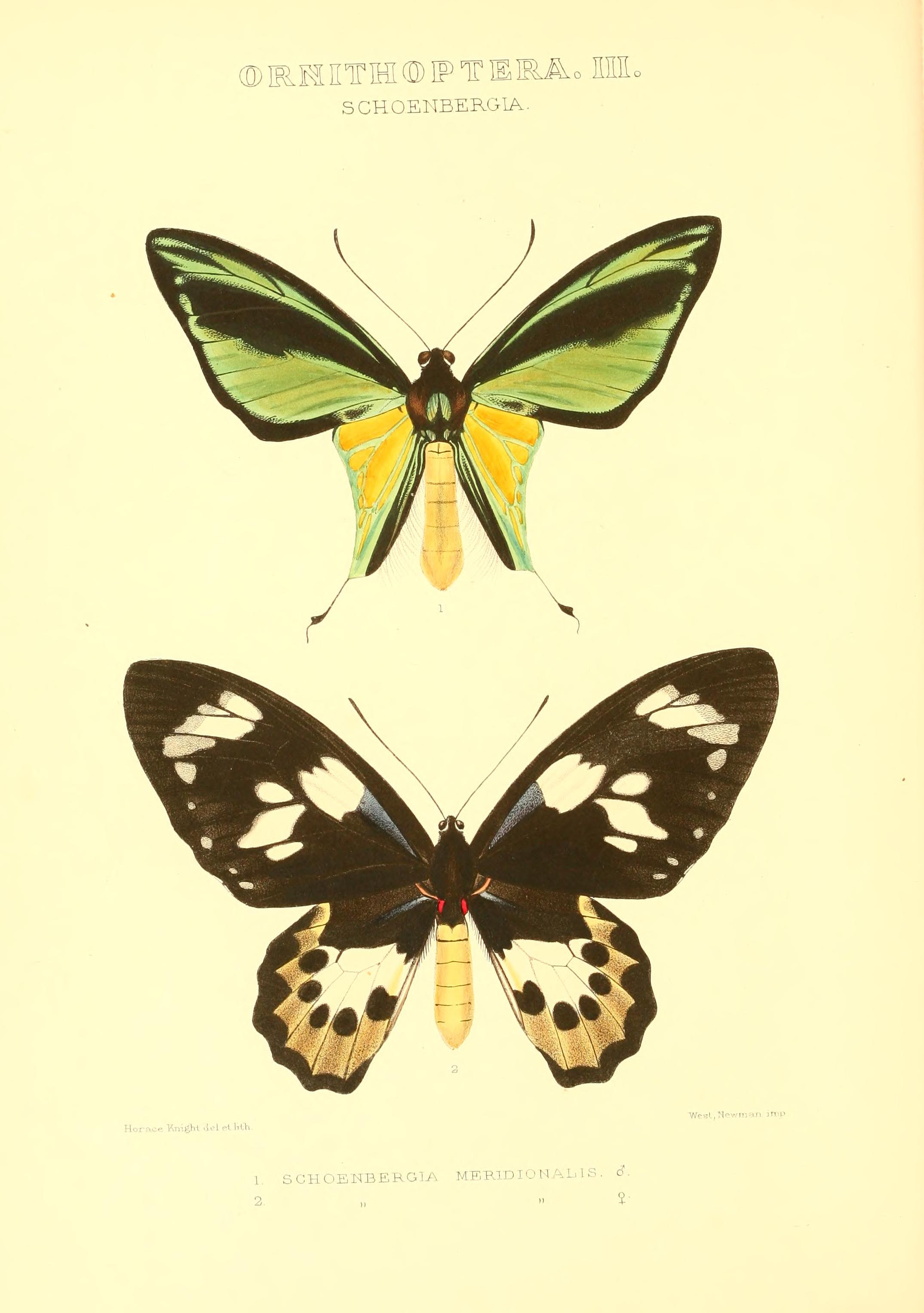
Plate from Rhopalocera Exotica

Troides Paradiseus Meridionalis, Rothschild, " Novitates Zoologicie," Vol. IV., p. 180, female . "Novitates Zoologicae," Vol. VI., p. 429, male. Exp. male . 4 and 1/2 inches, female. 5 inches.

Male. Upperside. "The forewing is narrower than in S. Paradiseus, Staudinger, its distal margin nearly straight; the anterior green streak is narrower, the posterior one wider, entering the cell and distally running up to the anterior one. On the underside the forewing has a broad black band, beginning at the costal margin before the middle of the cell, running to upper angle of cell and thence to the disc, being distally limited by veins R1 and R3; the yellowish green scaling between these veins reduced to two small submarginal spots; the yellowish streaks between the subcostal also reduced, the apex of the wing being black, with an ill-defined green streak of dispersed scales between SC3 and SC4 and a few more green scales behind SC4. "The hind wing of Meridionalis is more reduced in size than that of Paradiseus, narrower, the distal margin is gently concave, the tail is shorter, not gradually narrowing to the tip, but dilated before the apex, the anal angle is not produced; the fringe of hairs upon the abdominal fold is much longer and not so dense. In neuration, the cell is much narrower in Meridionalis, R3 and M1 come from the cell, while in Paradiseus they are stalked together. The pattern of the wing is also very peculiar. The black distal border of Paradiseus is in Meridionalis indicated only at the extreme edge of the wing; veins all yellowish-green, a narrow outer border to wing and a broader streak from near base to tail in front of submedian fold also yellowish-green; abdominal area up to submedian fold black, with a yellowish-green streak at basal edge, and another, more distal, streak of dispersed scales gradually disappearing distally; the golden yellow area divided by the green veins; cell all golden yellow."Femora as in female not striated with yellow, tibia broader than in Paradiseus"

"Female. The markings on the disc of both wings purer white, being less dusted over with black scales than in Paradiseus Paradiseus. The patch in the cell of forewing is nearly straight at the basal side, its basal edge being very feebly dentate, while at the apical side it bears one deep triangular notch. There are three discal patches.The light area of the hind wing is much extended, the apex of the cell bearing a large white patch which is obliquely cut off. The portion of the light area outside the diseal black spots is brighter yellow than in Paradiseus, and so is the upperside of the abdomen."

Hab. British New Guinea. The male and one female were captured by Mr. A. S. Meek at Milne Bay, and the type female by Mr. Anthony in the Mailu district. In the Collection of the Hon. Walter Rothschild. 1 am indebted to Mr. Rothschild for the privilege of publishing the Figures of this very remarkable aud beautiful species, and also for the above extract from his descriptions of both sexes.

== Gallery ==
Selection of museum specimens of Ornithoptera meridionalis
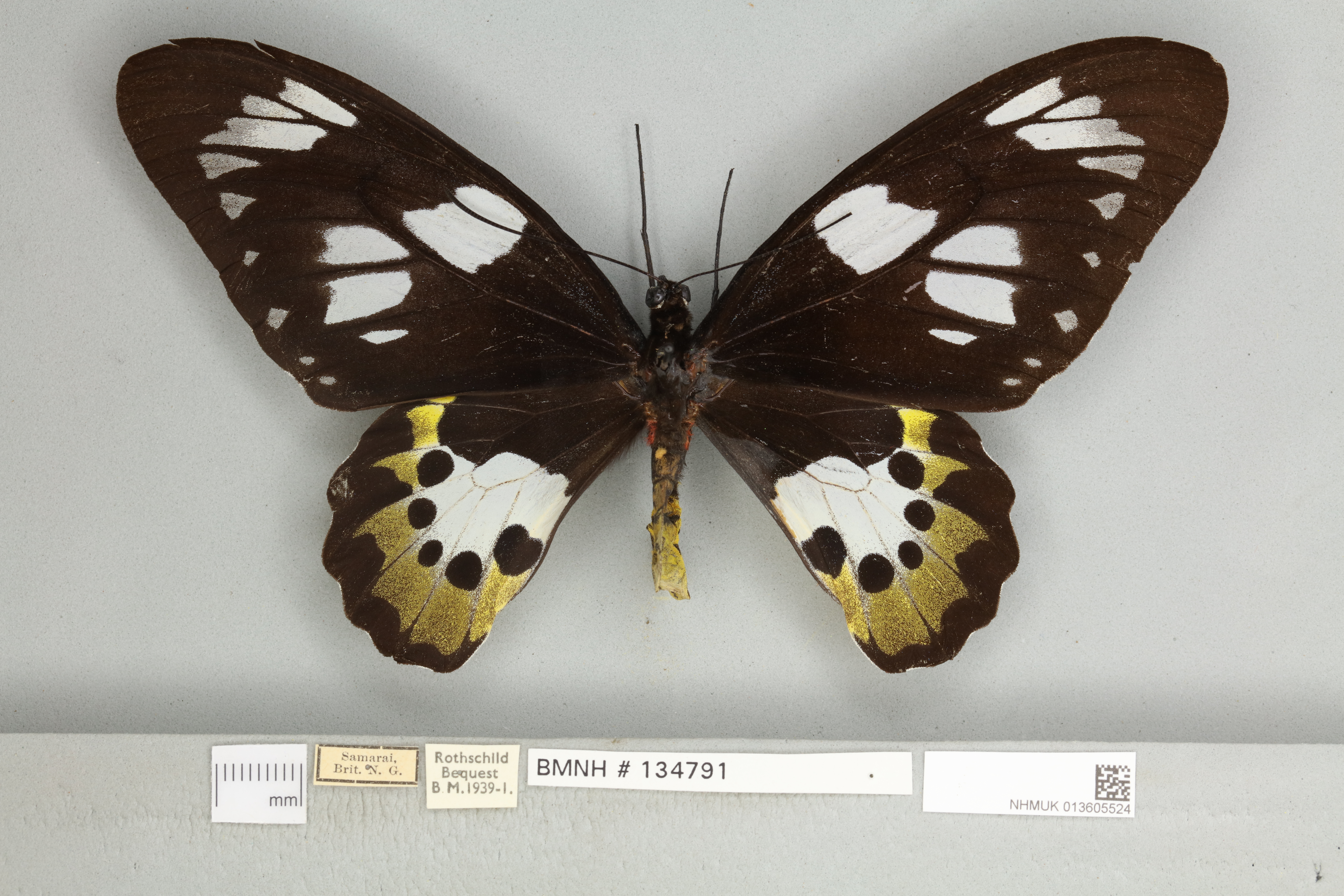
Ornithoptera meridionalis female, dorsal view

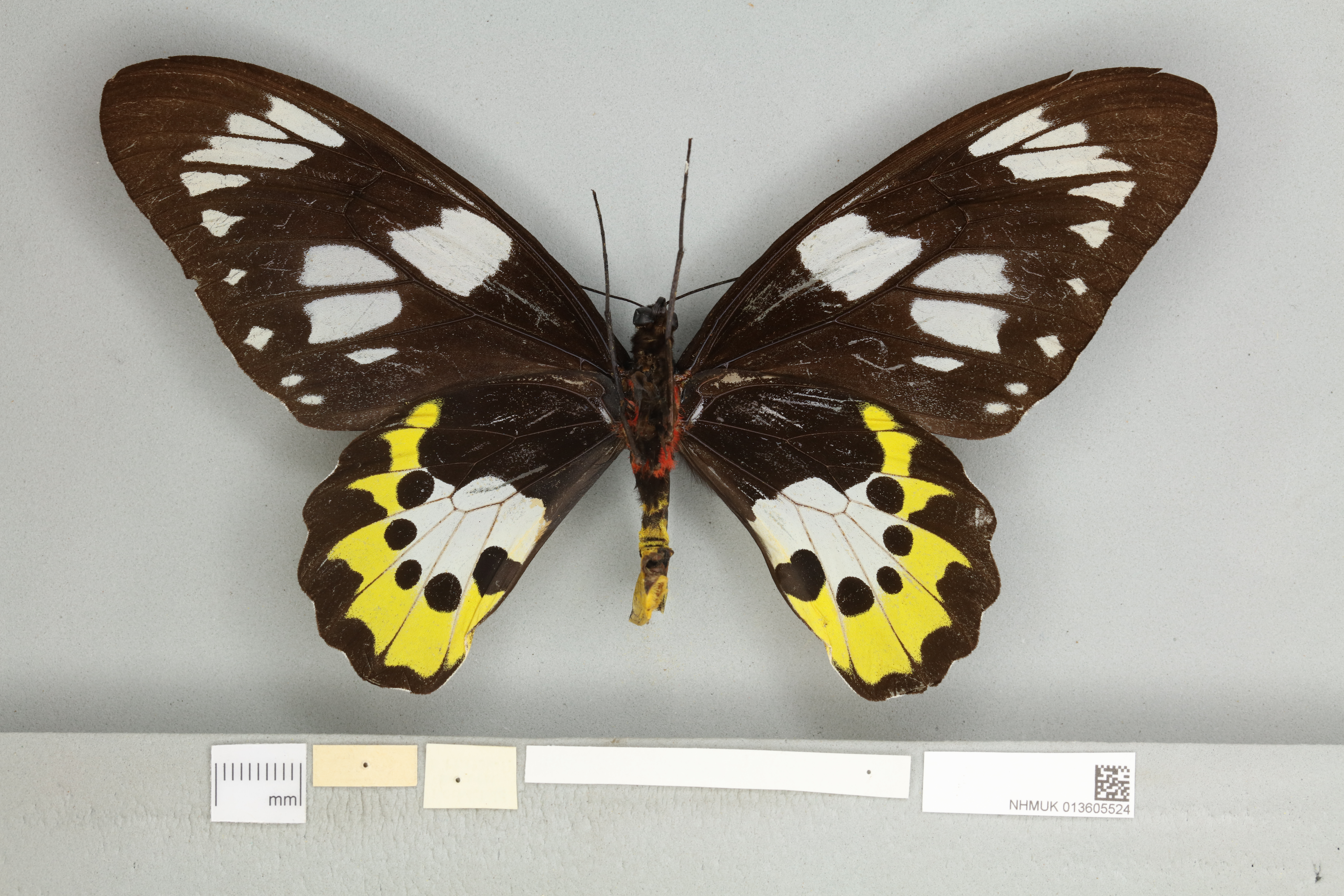
Ornithoptera meridionalis female, ventral view

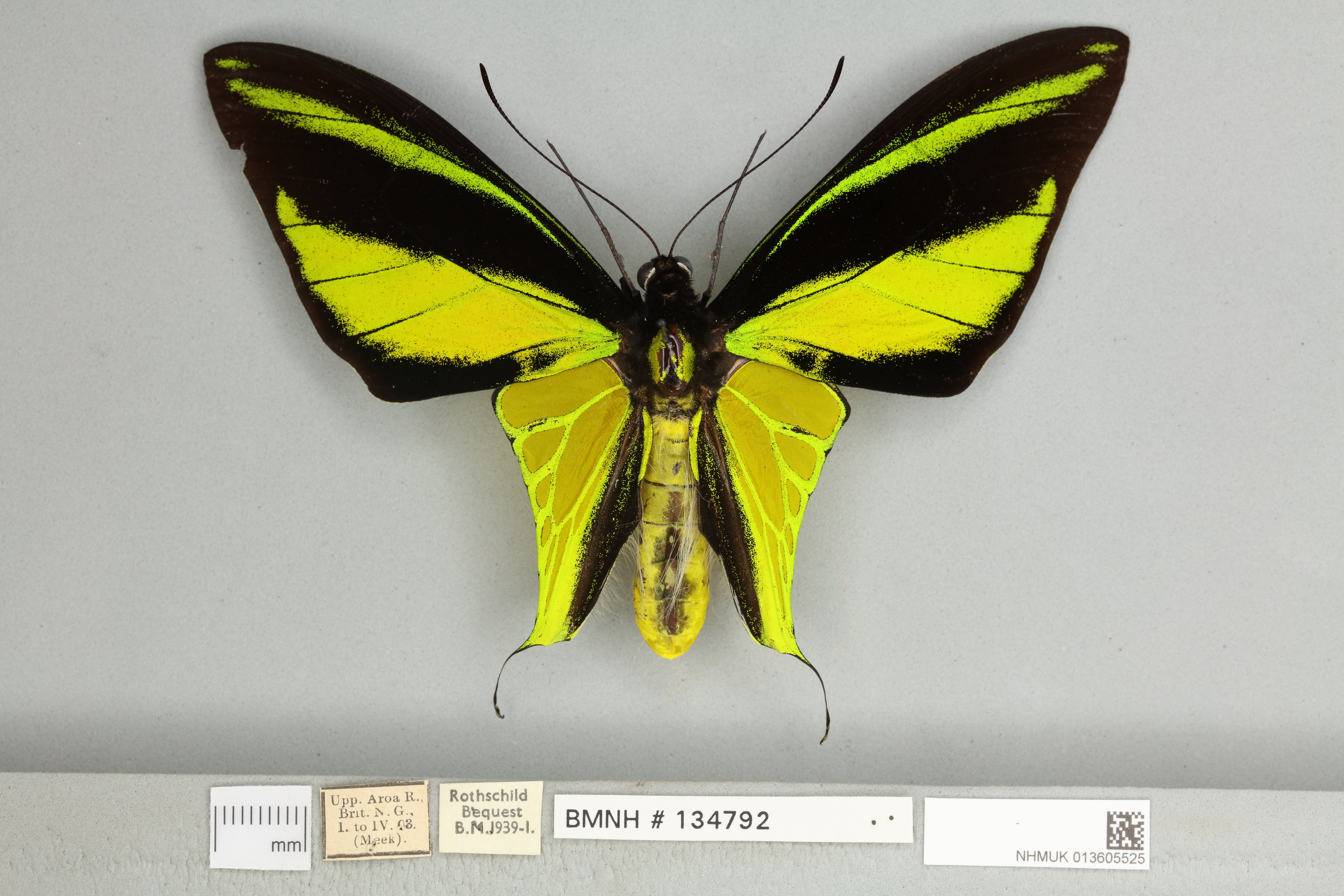
Ornithoptera meridionalis male, dorsal view

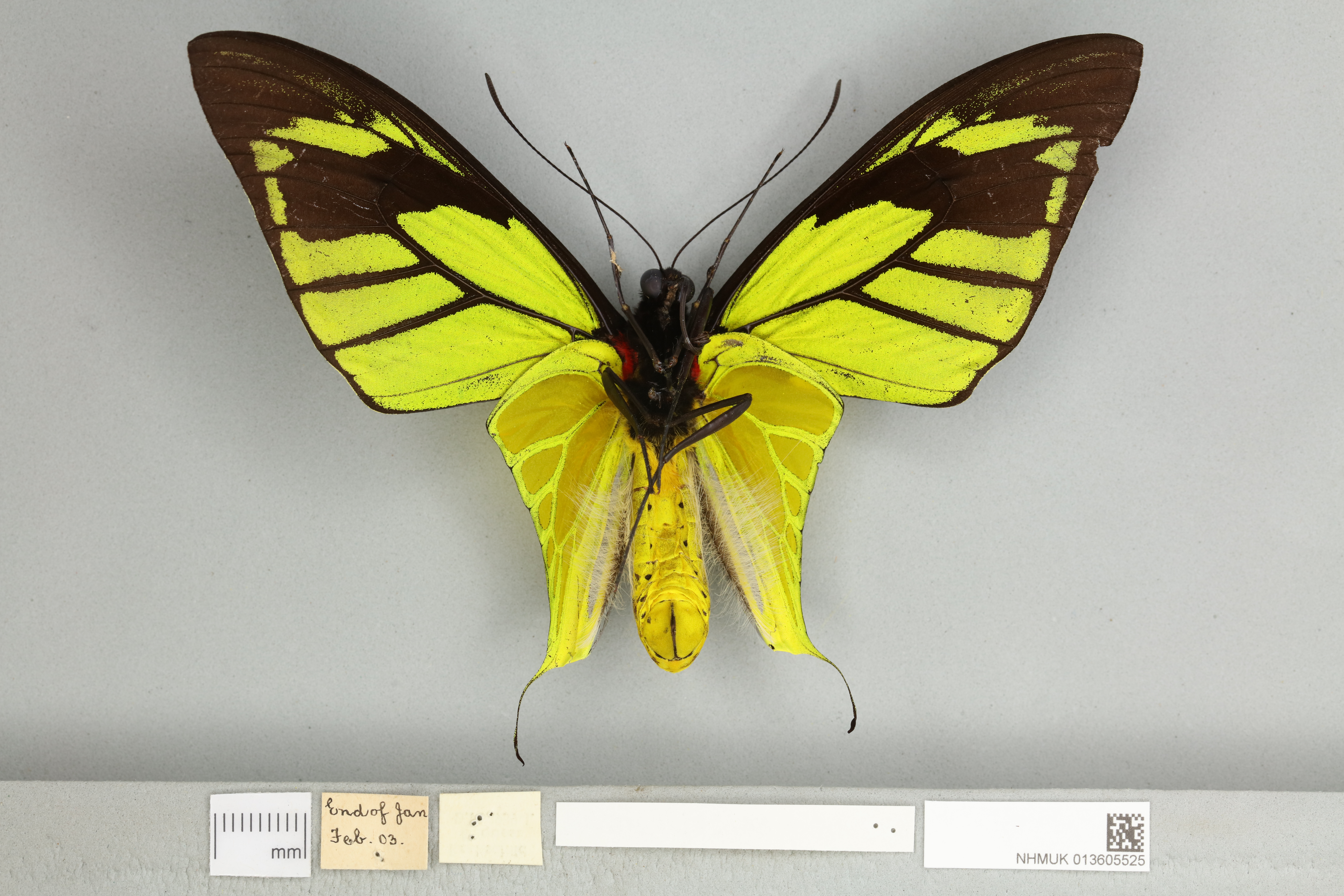
Ornithoptera meridionalis male, ventral view

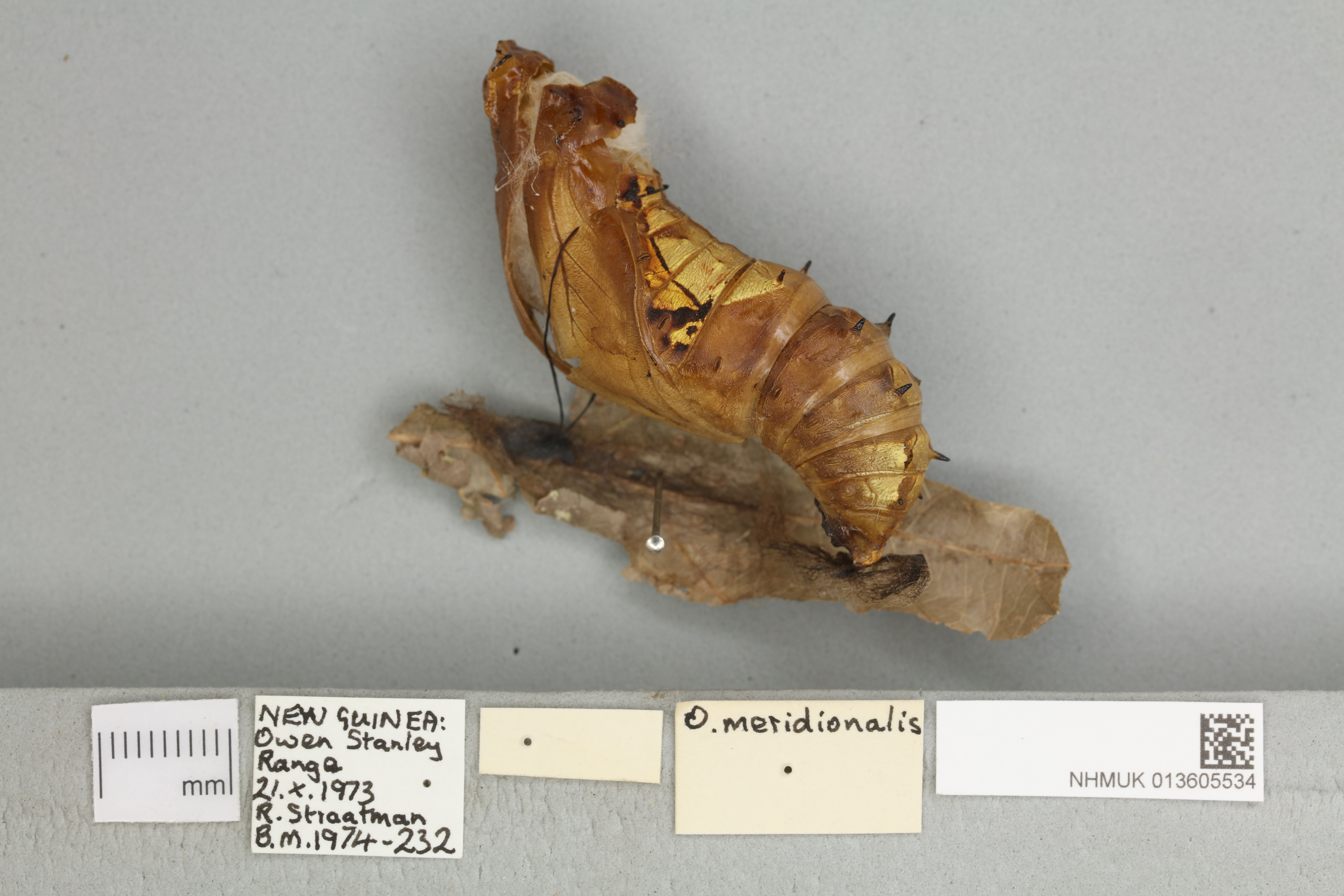
Ornithoptera meridionalis pupa, lateral view

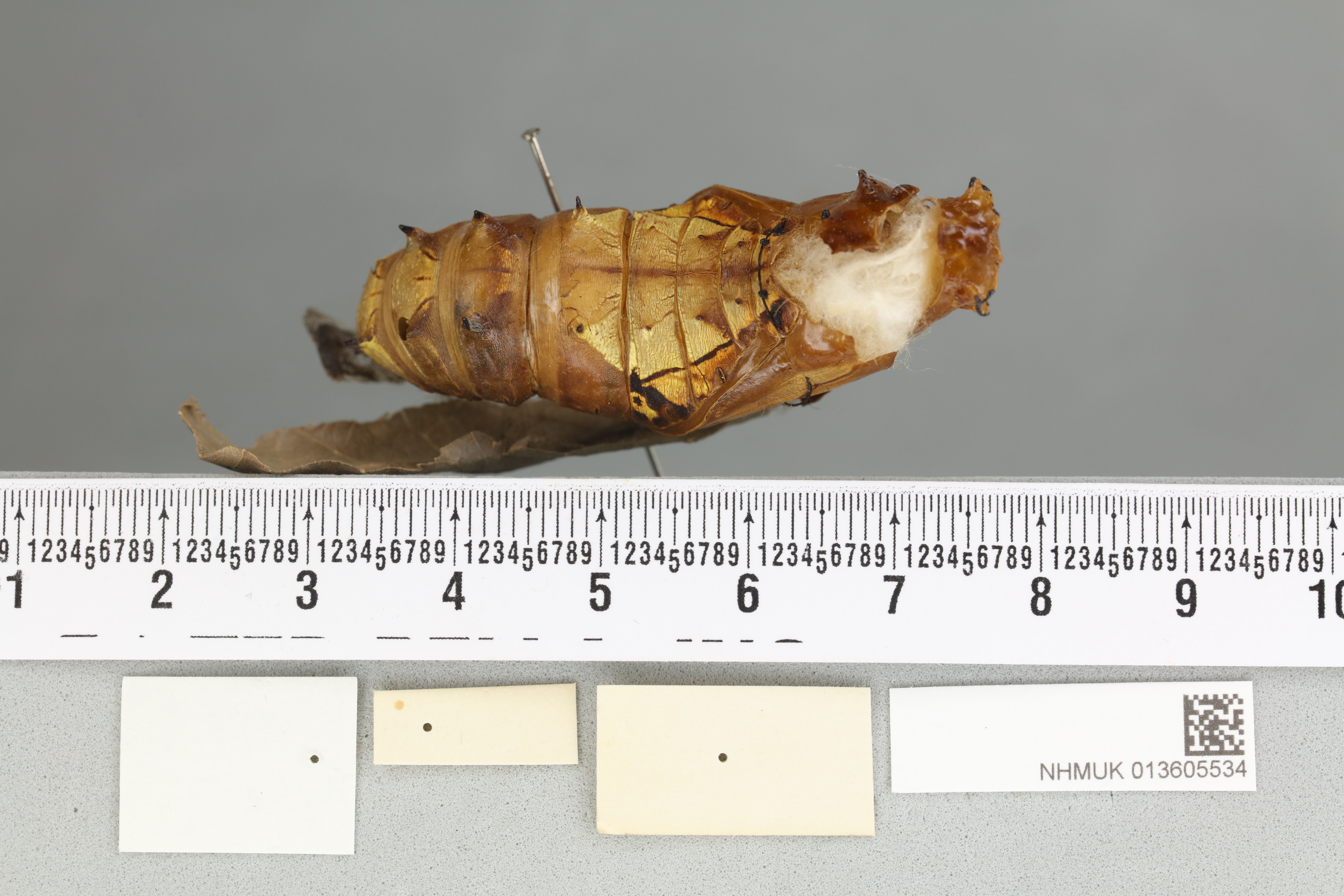
Ornithoptera meridionalis pupa, dorsal view
