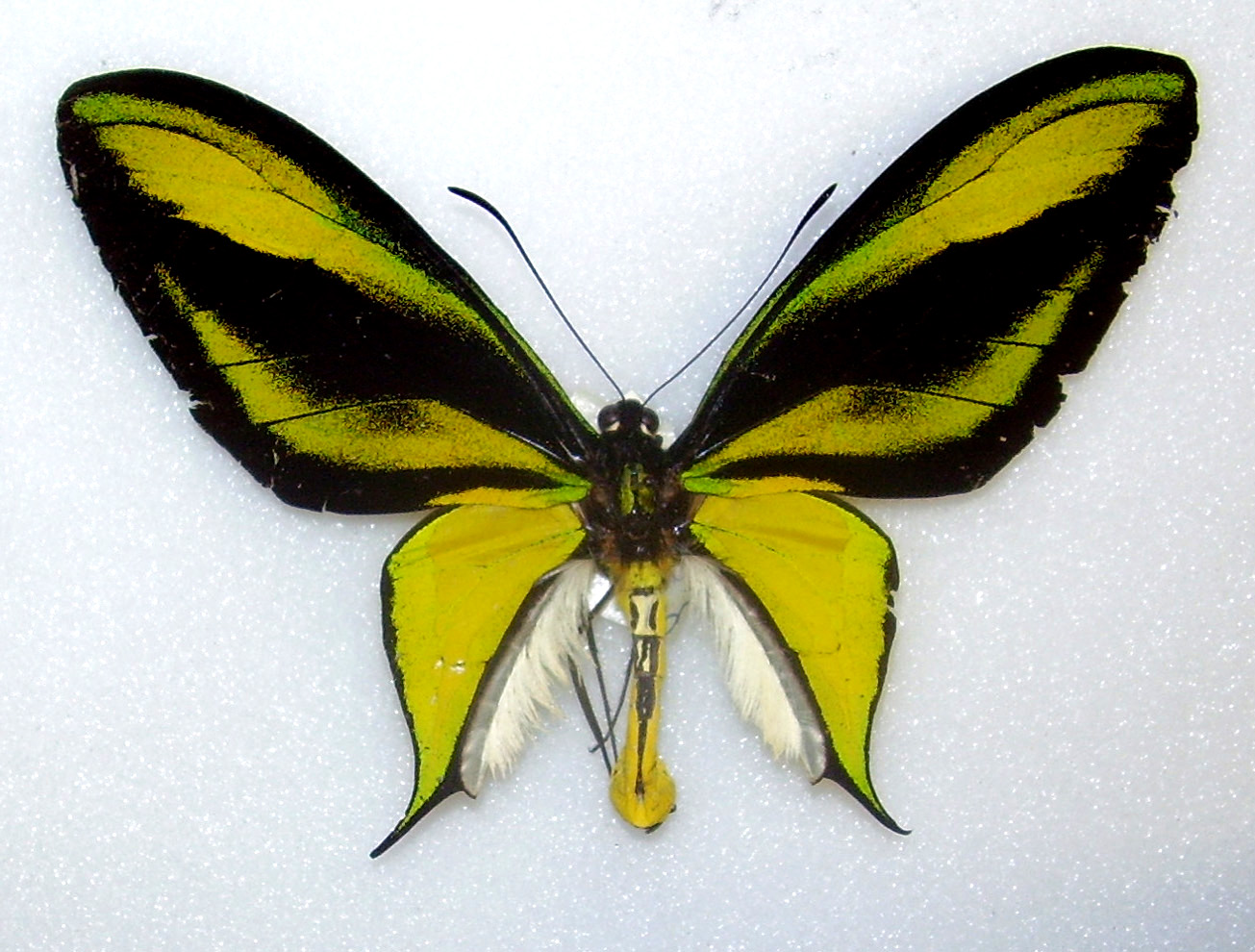
- Ornithoptera paradisea, male, dorsal
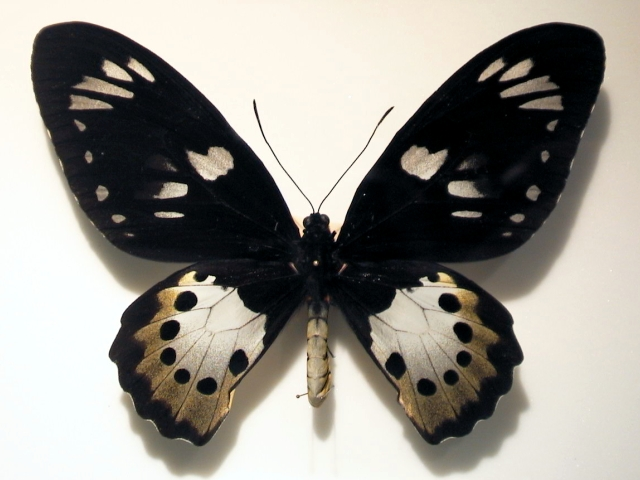
- Ornithoptera paradisea, female, dorsal

Conservation status
- Near Threatened (IUCN 3.1)
- CITES Appendix II

Scientific classification
- Kingdom: Animalia
- Phylum: Arthropoda
- Clade: Pancrustacea
- Class: Insecta
- Order: Lepidoptera
- Family: Papilionidae
- Genus: Ornithoptera
- Species: O. paradisea

Binomial name
- Ornithoptera paradisea Staudinger 1893

= Ornithoptera paradisea =

Paradise birdwing

Species of birdwing butterfly

Ornithoptera paradisea, the paradise birdwing, is a species of birdwing butterfly found in New Guinea.

== History ==
Arnold Pagenstecher and Staudinger both described this butterfly, under different names and the first description by Staudinger was based on a manuscript sent to him by Pagenstecher who possessed specimens from the collection of D. Wolf von Schönberg in Naumburg who had acquired them from a colonist, Karl Wahnes in the then German New Guinea. Pagenstecher's name is Schoenbergia schoenbergi and the year of publication also 1893. Robert Henry Fernando Rippon in his illustrated monograph Icones Ornithopterorum (1898 to 1906) attributes the name paradisea to both entomologists i.e. as Ornithoptera paradisea Pagenstecher and Staudinger.

The holotype is held by Zoologische Staatssammlung München. which also holds the type of Ornithoptera schoenbergi Pagenstecher. The type locality is the Finisterre Range, New Guinea.

The specific epithet paradisea, is the Persian word for paradise.

== Description ==
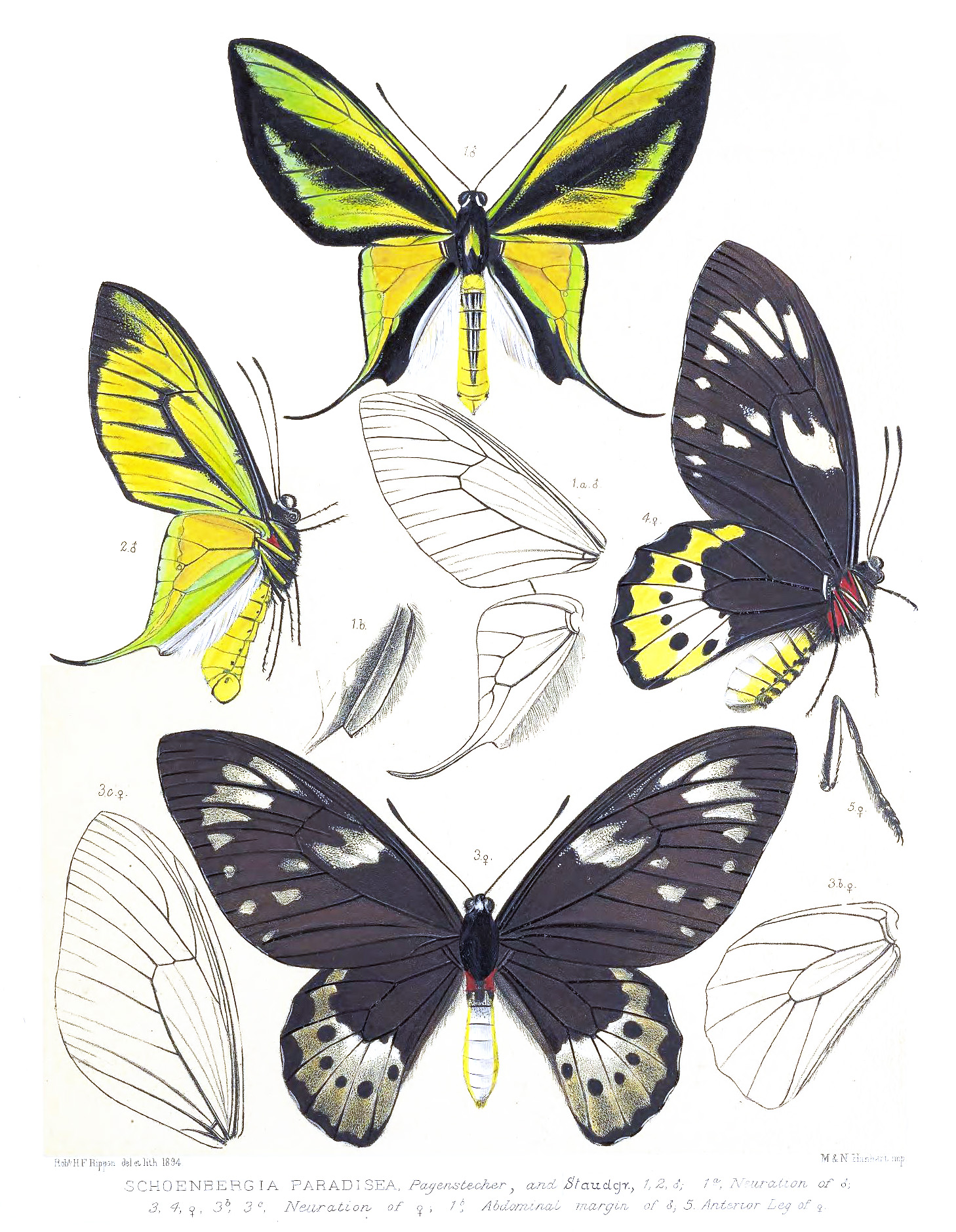
Illustration of both males and females

Ornithoptera paradisea is a large butterfly with a wingspan ranging from 135 mm to 190 mm. As they are sexually dimorphic, males and females differ in the size, shape and colour of the wings.

Male: Males have black forewings. The costal edge is black and there are two large, yellow gold and green bands. The underside of the male forewing is green with black veins and at the apex there is a black area. The hindwings are tiny triangles, golden and with thin tails. The inner edge of the hindwing is black and there is usually a green stripe between the golden area and the inner edge. The outer edge of the hindwing is usually green. The underside is very similar to the upperside but the inner edge is green and hairy. The hindwings have tails of uncertain selective origin. The only other tailed Ornithoptera is Ornithoptera meridionalis.

The abdomen is yellow, the head and thorax are black and green.

Female: O. paradisea is strongly sexually dimorphic and the significantly larger female covers the upper range of the wingspan. The basic colour is dark-brown. Two groups of white spots dominate the forewing and on the hindwings there is a white area with a yellow outer edge. Between these there is a chain of black spots. The underside is very similar to the upperside, but the colours are stronger.

The abdomen is yellow, the head and thorax are black and green.

== Biology and life cycle ==
The habitat is lowland or montane primary forest. Adult males fly high around trees rarely descending to the ground. Females fly below the canopy searching for the food plant which is a species of Aristolochia with orange fruits. The male emits a pleasant scent from the fringe of white hairs along the anal vein of the hindwing.

The egg is 4 mm. in diameter and light orange. Eggs are laid singly and are attached to the ventral surface of an Aristolochia leaf or a nearby object. The first instar larva is dark red wine colour. Instars 2-5 are velvet black and bear red tubercles with long black tips. The pupa is brown with a bright yellow and orange saddlemark. It has a waxy coating and two short, sharp spurs on abdominal segments 3–6.

The eggs are parasitised by species of Chalcidoidea and the larvae are parasitised by Braconidae. Ants, lizards and birds eat the larvae and pupae and in monsoon the larvae suffer 30% mortality.

The paradise birdwing is closely related to Ornithoptera meridionalis.

== Subspecies ==
- Ornithoptera paradisea paradisea Staudinger, 1893 - Papua New Guinea
- Ornithoptera paradisea chrysanthemum (Kobayashi & Koiwaya, 1979) - Papua, Indonesia

=== Taxonomic history of subspecies ===
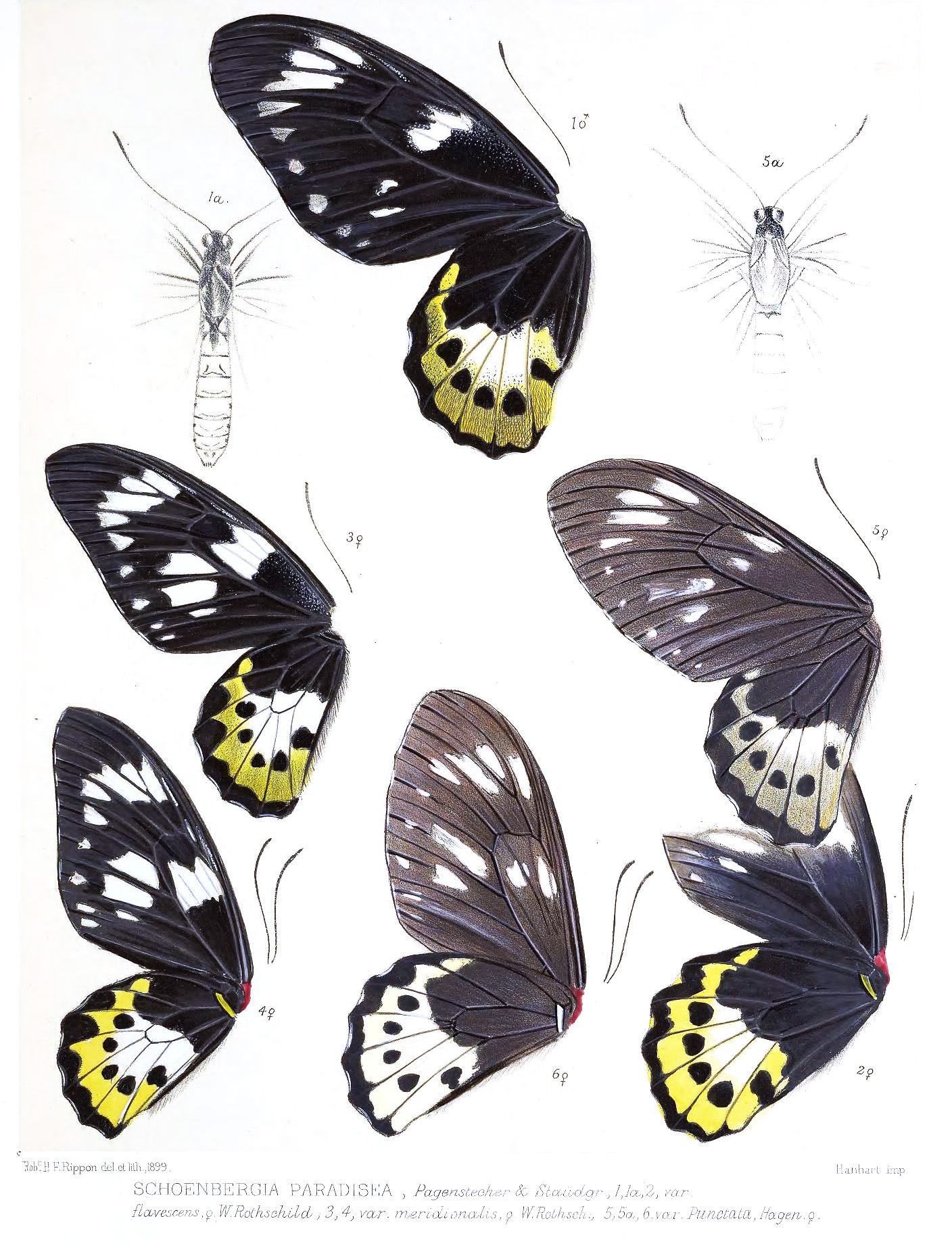
Illustration of females

Historically, 7 subspecies were recognized:

- Ornithoptera paradisea paradisea Staudinger, 1893 — Huon Peninsula to Astrolabe Bay in lowlands.
- Ornithoptera paradisea borchi (Haugum & Low, 1974) — Central parts of the Northern Ranges: Torricelli and Alexander Mountains, and at Dreikir, East Sepik district, at altitudes from 1500 feet but mostly from 2000 to 3000 feet. the male abdomen has a simple median pattern, the dorsal fringes are snow white, the outer margin of hindwing averaging and additional golden and iridescent green spots present with a larger frequency than in the nominate subspecies. Females have a modified wing-shape and pattern.
- Ornithoptera paradisea chrysanthemum (Kobayashi & Koiwaya, 1979)
- Ornithoptera paradisea demeter (So & Sato, 1998) — type locality: Papua New Guinea, Southern Highlands Province, Lake Kutubu.
- Ornithoptera paradisea detanii Schäffler, 2001 — Sudirman Range
- Ornithoptera paradisea flavescens Rothschild, 1897 — Etna Bay, probably lowland. Based on a sole female specimen and the status is doubtful. Original description
- Ornithoptera paradisea arfakensis Joicey & Noakes, 1915 — Arfak Mountains of the Vogelkop Peninsula, high altitude. A very distinct purely high-altitude subspecies, and the distribution is separated from that of the nominate subspecies. Considered a full species by some recent authors.

The 2004 revision by Gilles Delisle accepted three subspecies:

- Troides paradisea paradisea (with borchi, demeter, and flavescens as junior synonyms)
- Troides paradisea chrysanthemum
- Troides paradisea arfakensis

The 2021 study by Allio et al. recognized Ornithoptera arfakensis as a distinct species.

== Conservation ==
Supported by World Association of Zoos and Aquariums who claim that Papua New Guinea farmers achieve more income with breeding butterflies for life exhibits in zoos than with cultivation of coffee encourage support for the natural butterfly populations by cultivating food plants. Income is also made from sales to collectors. In his 1983 report to the Department of Primary Industries, Papua New Guinea, M.J. Parsons wrote that "Ironically it is now becoming an accepted fact that the very demand for Ornithoptera is one of the main assets which will ensure their future survival if they can be exploited in the correct way."

The paradise birdwing is listed on CITES appendix II, limiting the international exportation of the species to those who are granted a permit.

== Gallery ==
Selection of museum specimens of Ornithoptera paradisea
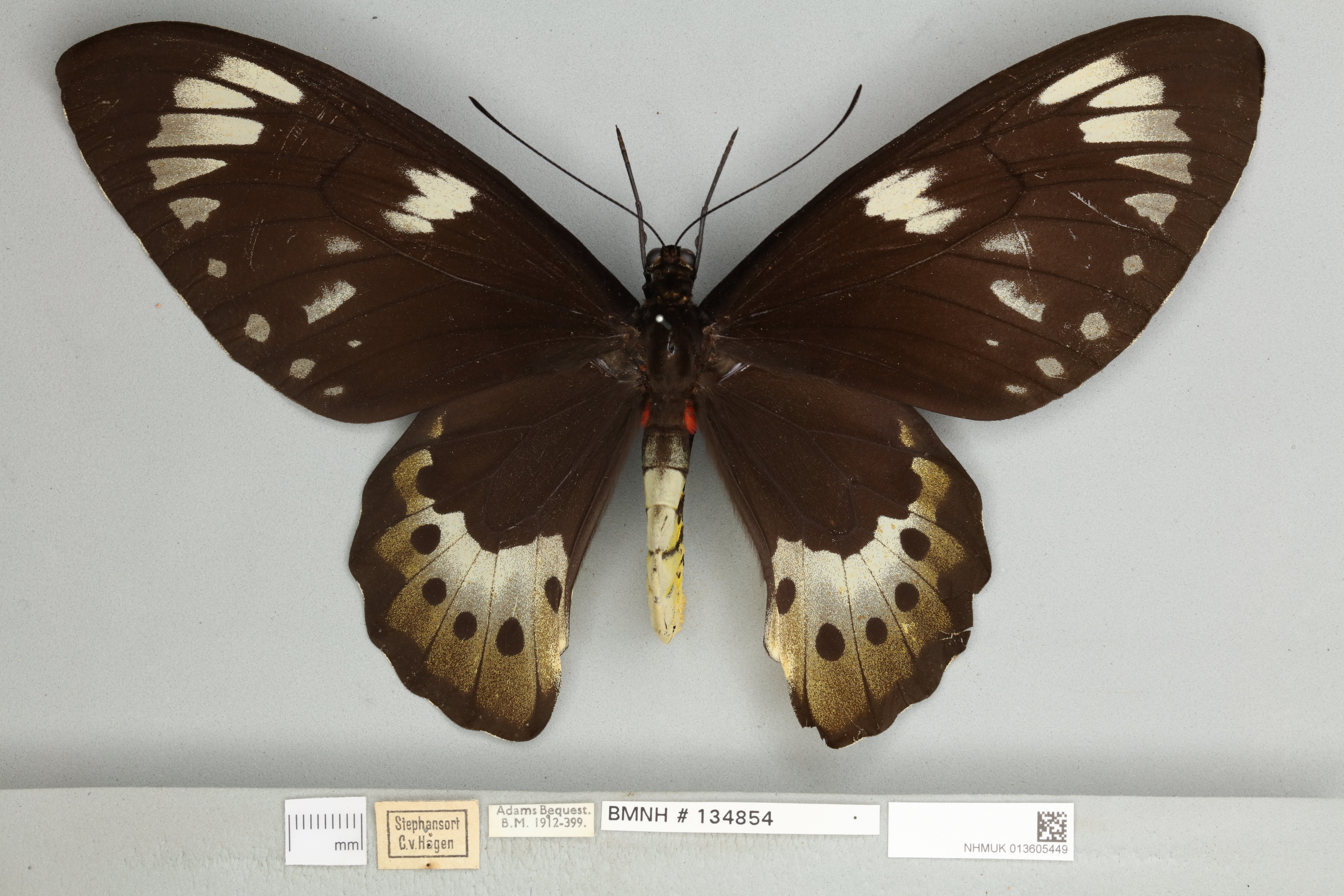
Ornithoptera paradisea female, dorsal view

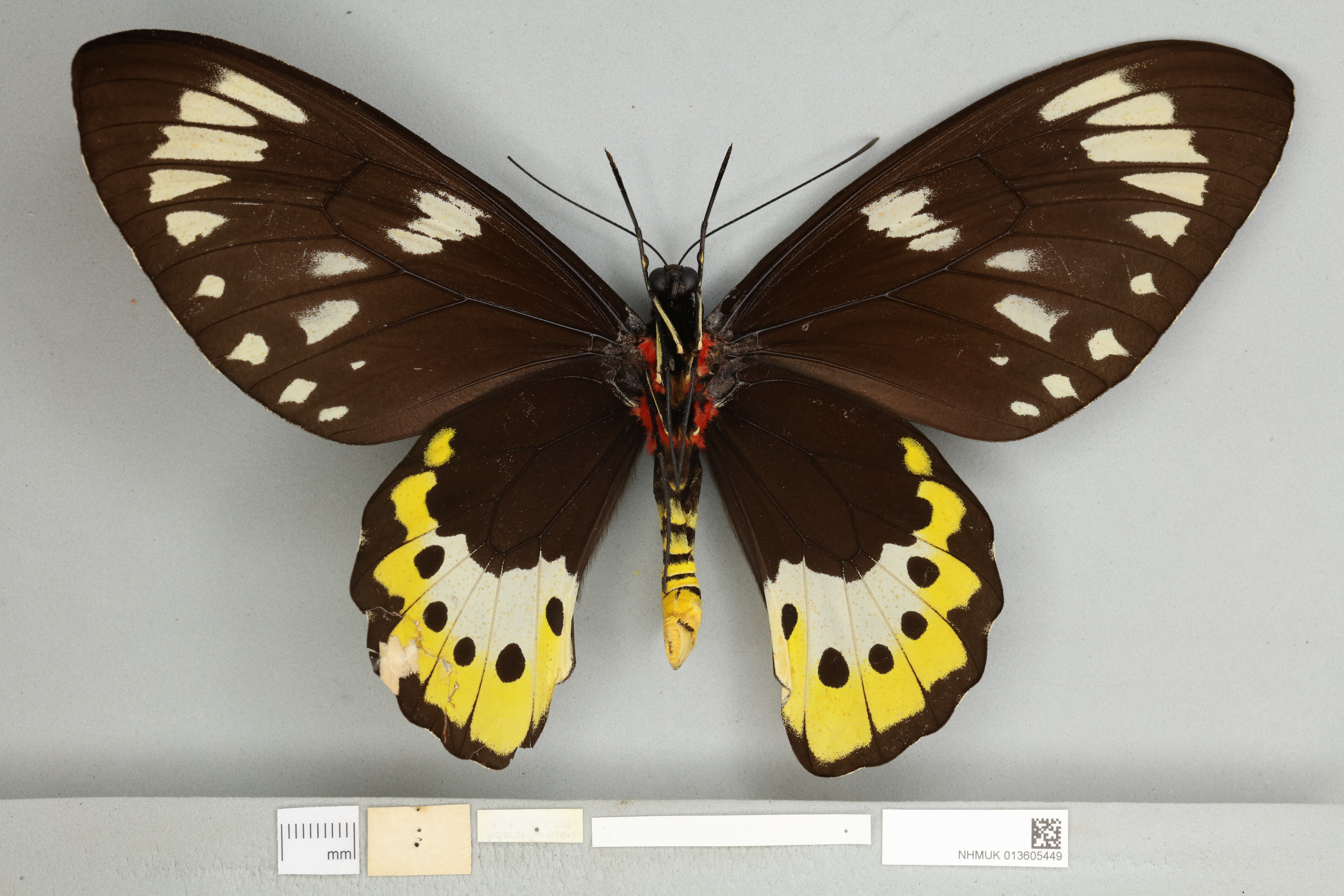
Ornithoptera paradisea female, ventral view

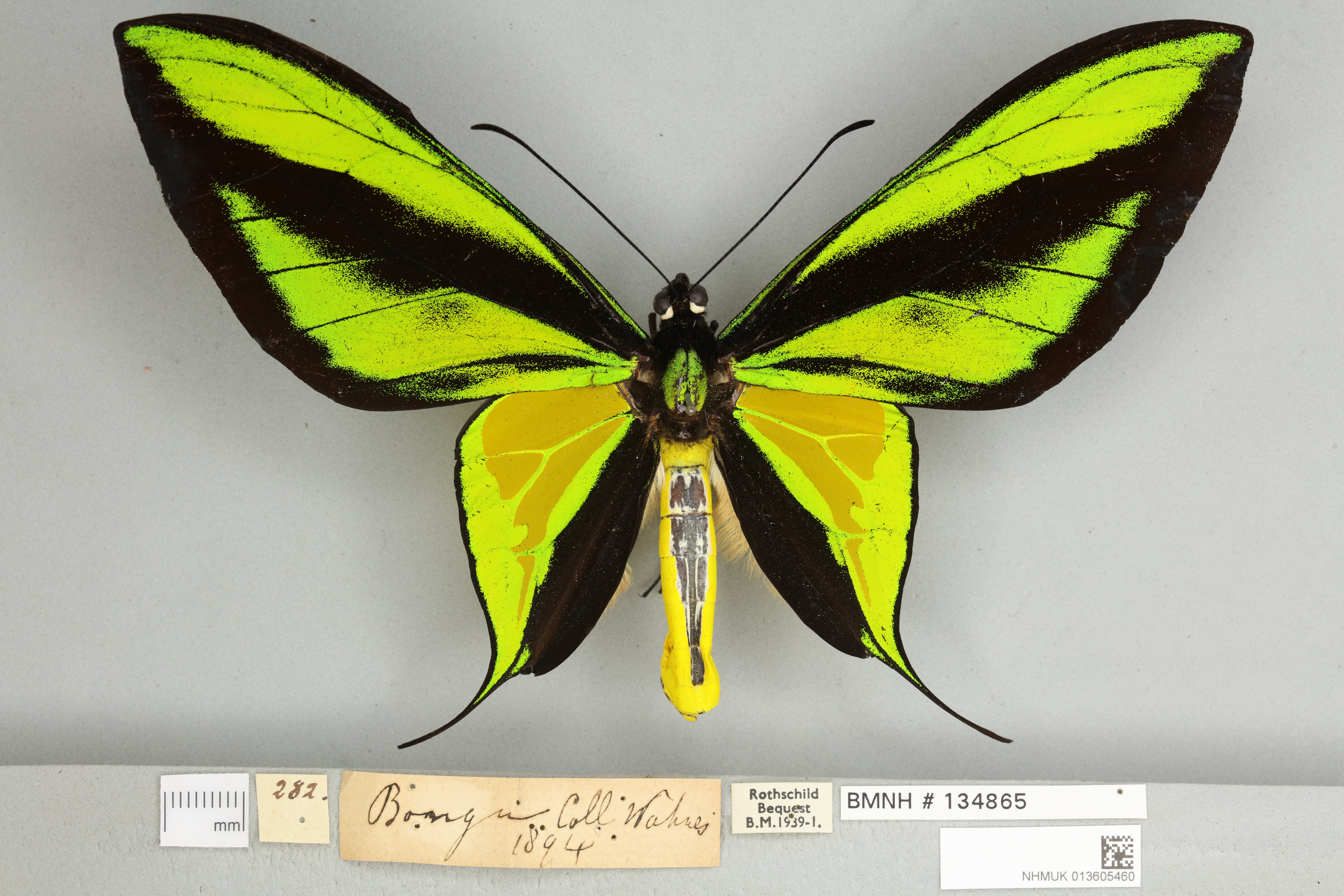
Ornithoptera paradisea male, dorsal view

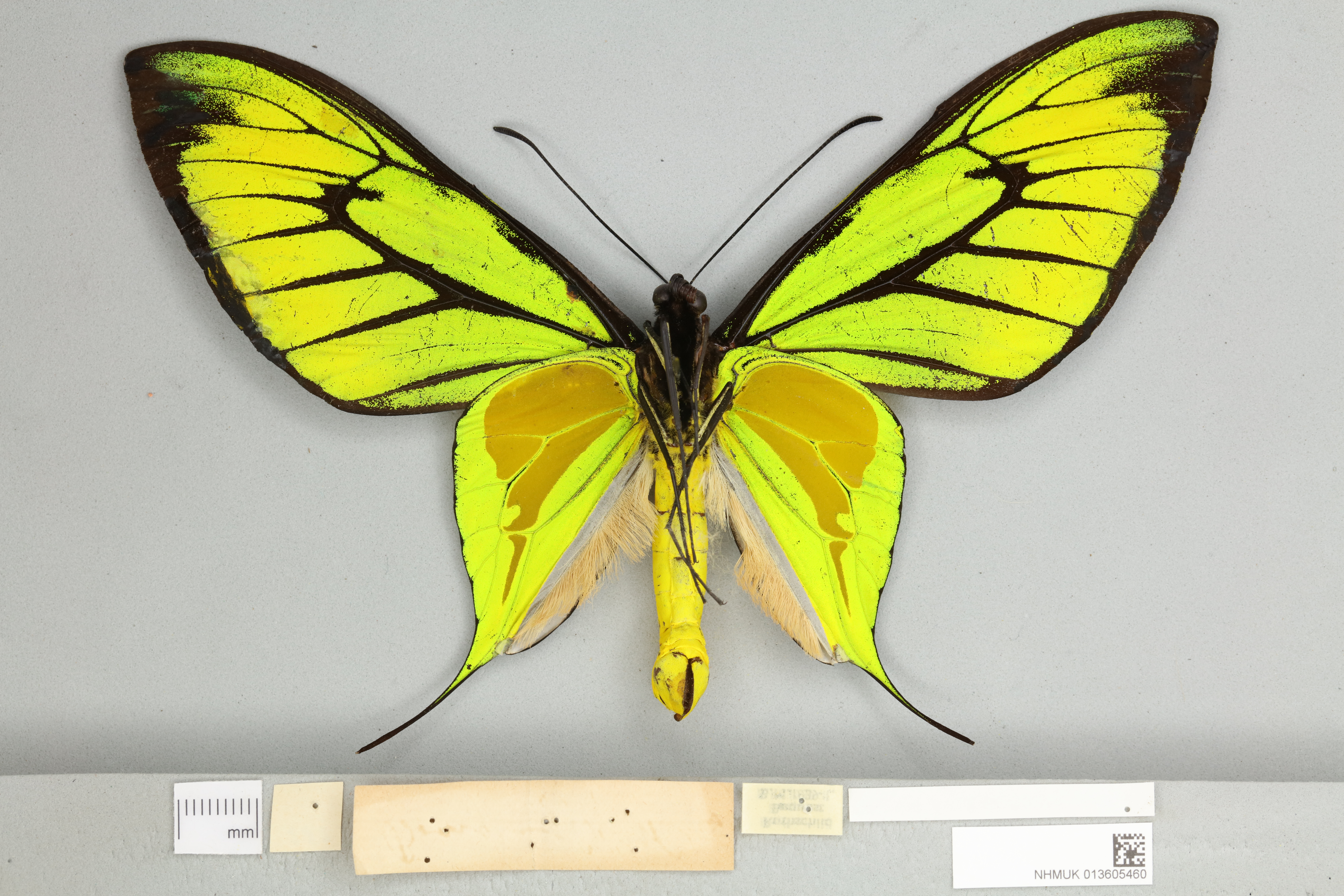
Ornithoptera paradisea male, ventral view

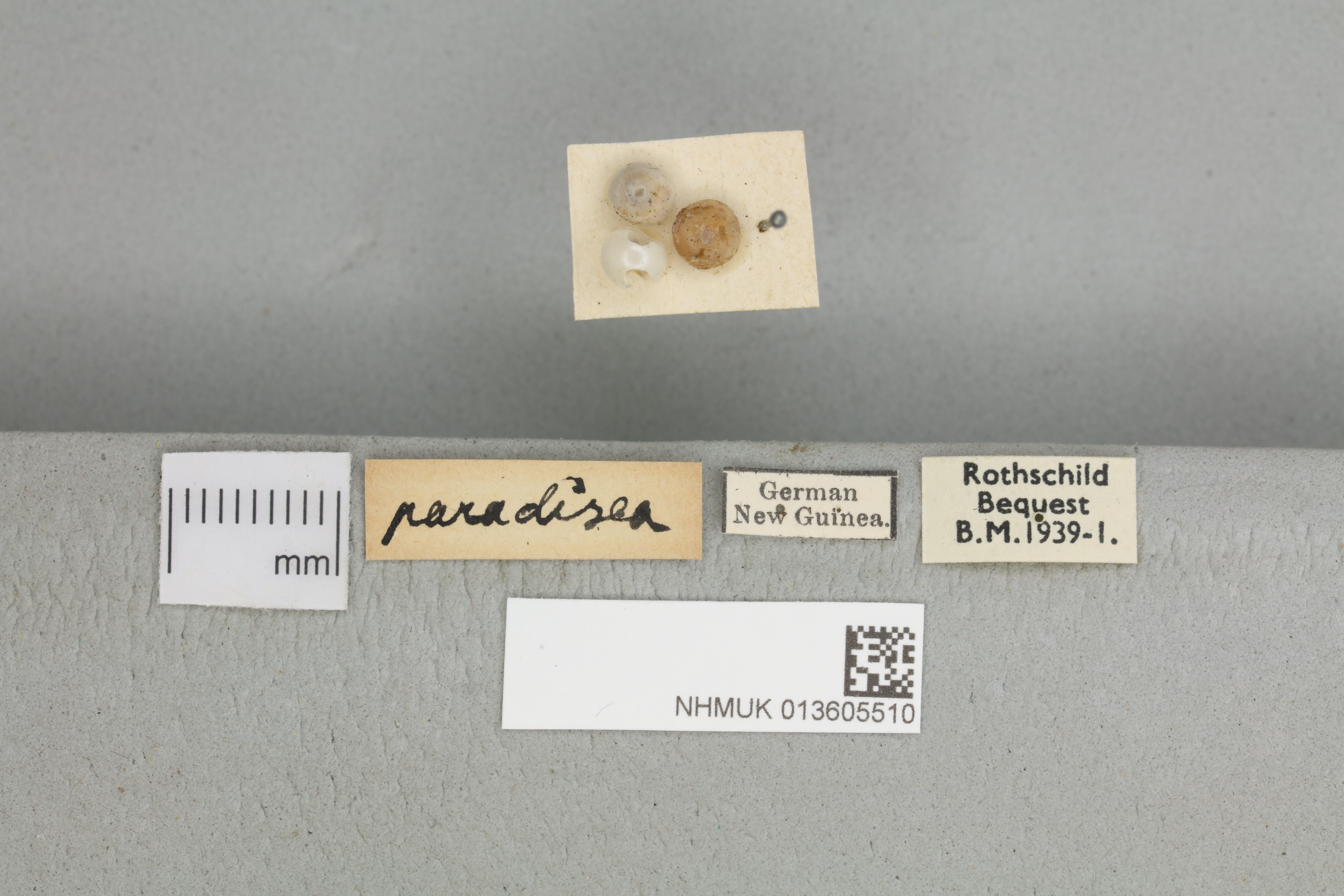
Ornithoptera paradisea, three eggs, dorsal view

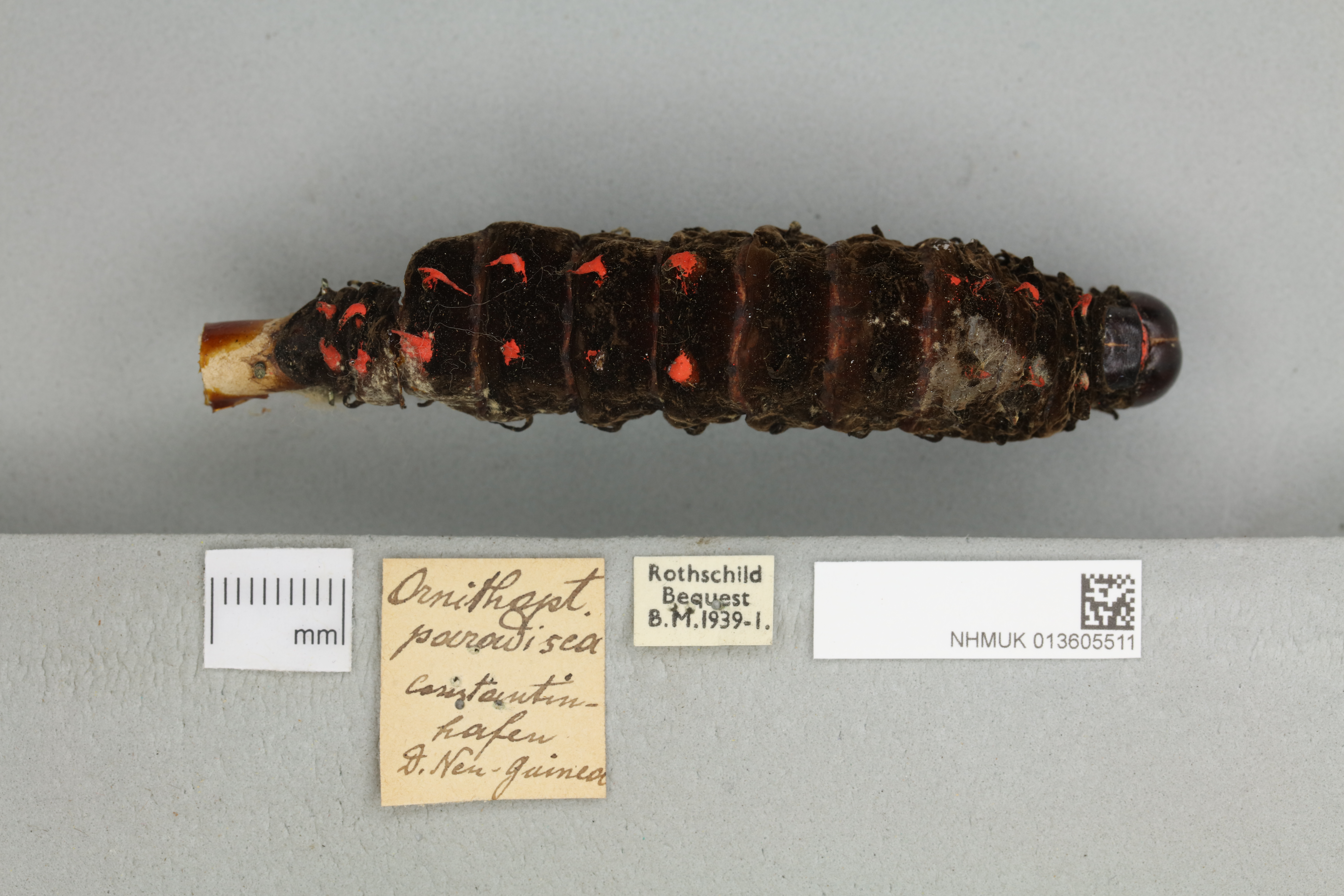
Ornithoptera paradisea larva, dorsal view

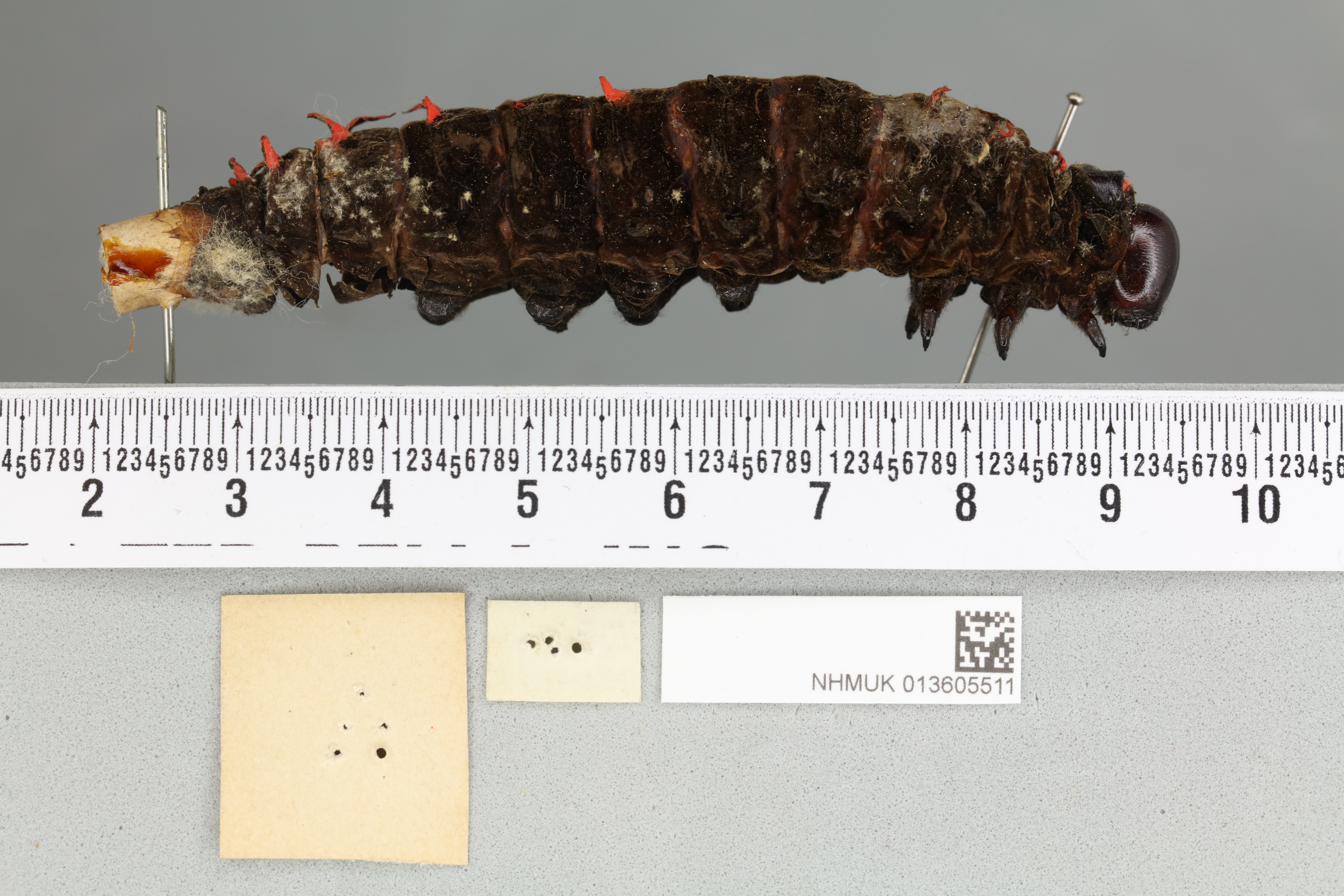
Ornithoptera paradisea larva, lateral view

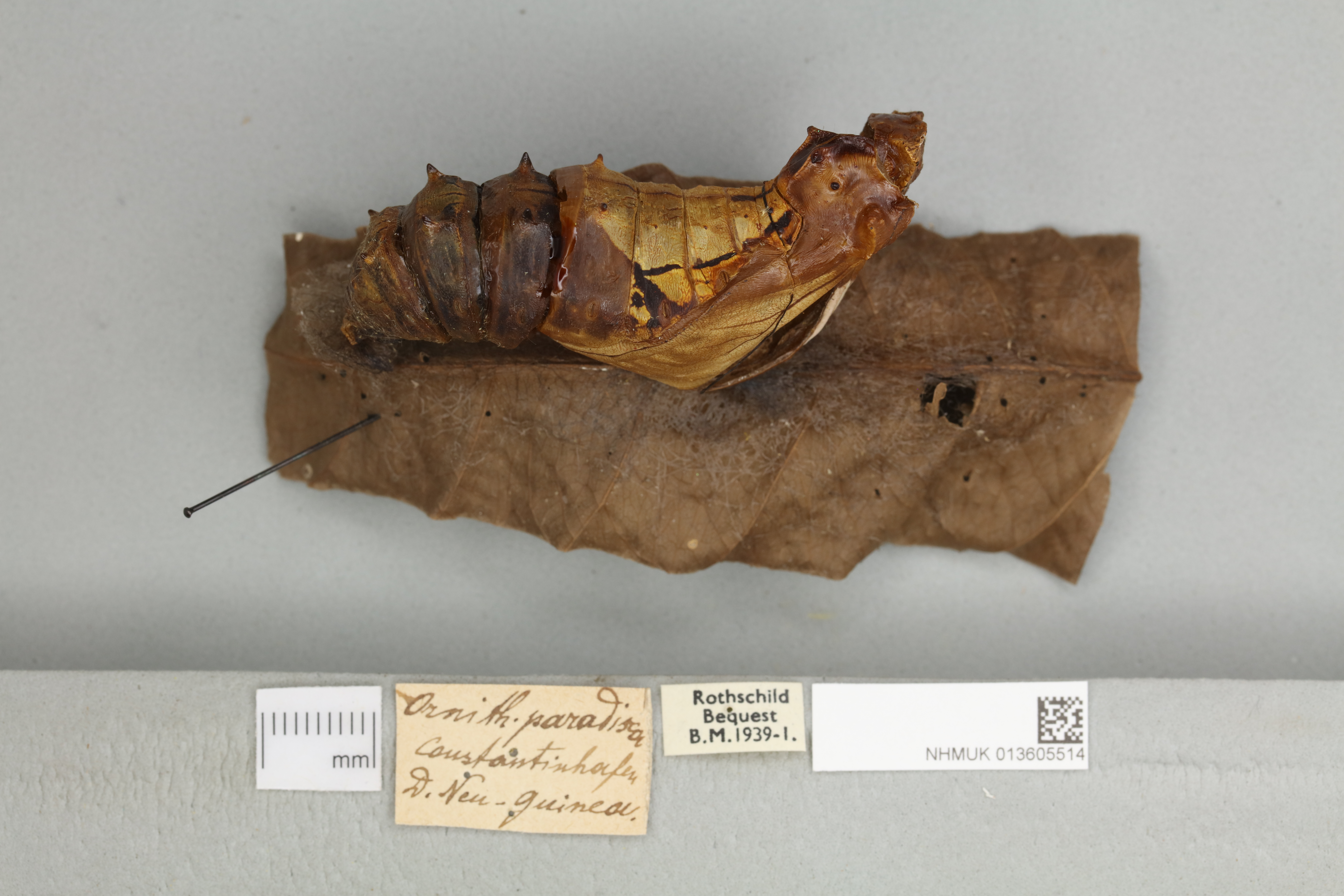
Ornithoptera paradisea pupa, lateral view

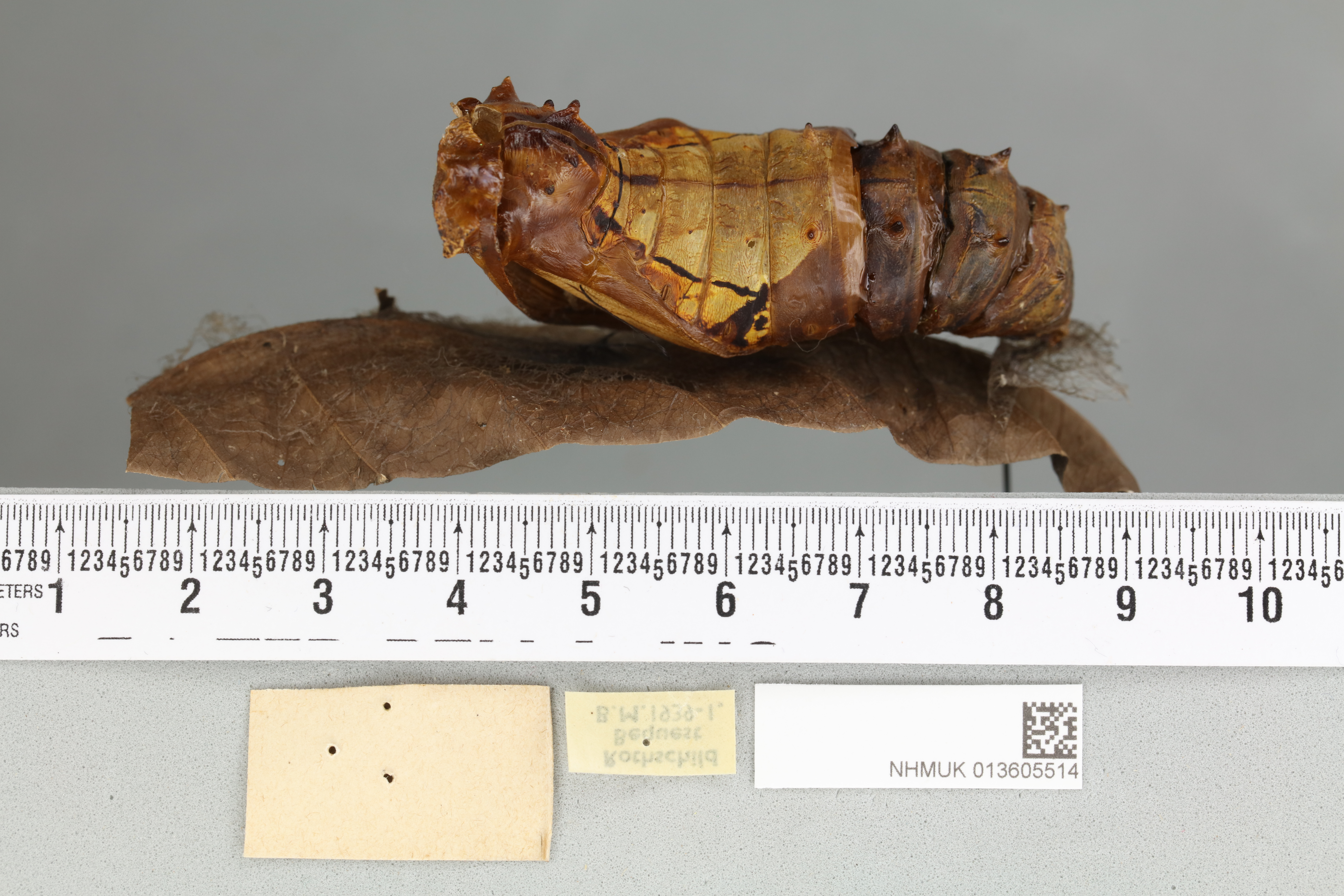
Ornithoptera paradisea pupa, dorsal view

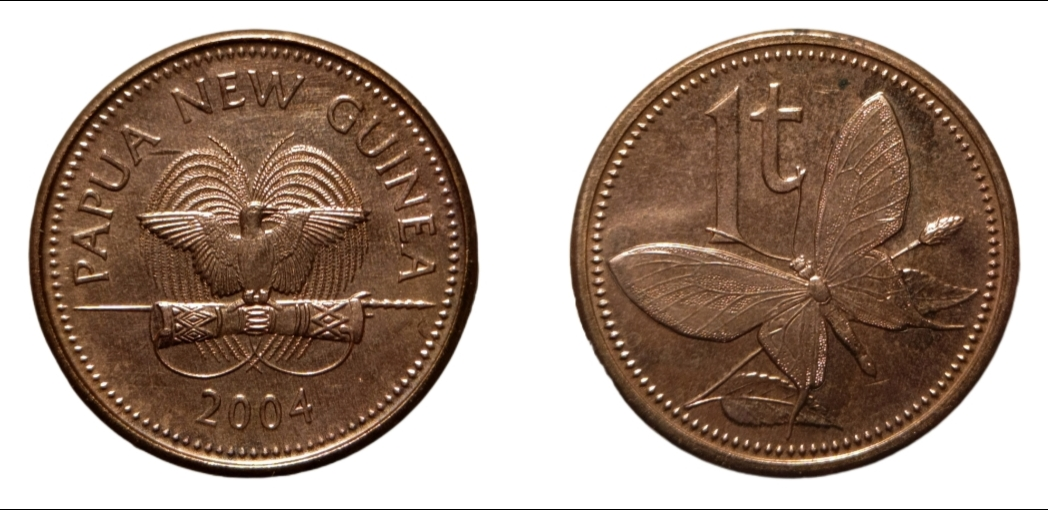
Ornithoptera paradisea on the reverse of a Papua New Guinea coin

== Other sources ==
- D'Abrera, B. (1975) Birdwing Butterflies of the World. Country Life Books, London.
- Borch, H. and Schmid. F., 1975 . The life cycle of Ornithoptera paradisea (Papilionidae). Journal of the Lepidopterists' Society 29: 1–9. 12 col figures. pdf includes colour photos of egg, larval instars and pupa.
- Haugum & Low, 1974 The sub-species and forms of the tailed Birdwing Ornithoptera paradisea Staud Entomologist's Rec. J. Var. 1974: First description of Ornithoptera (Schoenbergia) paradisea borchi
- Haugum, J. & Low, A.M. 1978–1985. A Monograph of the Birdwing Butterflies. 2 volumes. Scandinavian Press, Klampenborg; 663 pp.
- Savela, Markku. Website on Lepidoptera (accessed 14 November 2012)
- So, H. & S. Sato, 1998: A new subspecies of Ornithoptera paradisea Staudinger, 1893 (Lepidoptera, Papilionidae). Transactions of the Lepidopterological Society of Japan 49(2): 135–146. Full paper
