= Karl Wahnes =

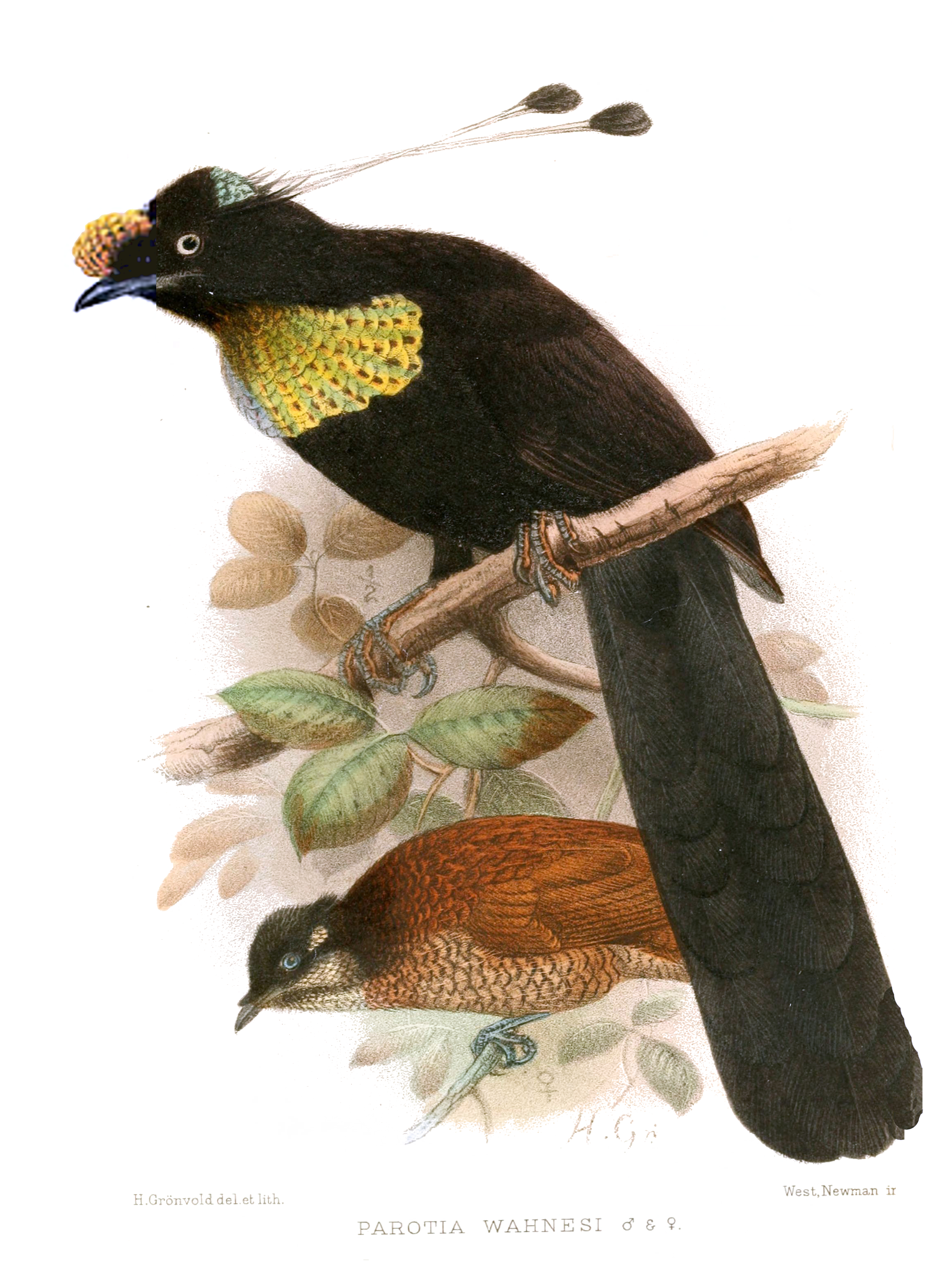
Wahnes's parotia a Bird of Paradise

Karl Wahnes or Carl (11 March 1833 Weimar - 8 March 1910 Halle (Saale)) was a German entomologist, ornithologist and collector in the East Indies and New Guinea He collected partly for Wolf von Schönberg a collector from Naumburg, partly for Staudinger & Bang-Haas, for the Natural History Museum at Tring and others in 1886/91 in South-East Borneo and 1891 to 1909 in German New Guinea (Konstantinhafen, Sattelberg, etc.) and made short detours from New Guinea e.g. in 1893 to the Solomon Islands and in 1909 to the Bismarck Archipelago).

== See also ==
- Ornithoptera paradisea
- Delias schoenbergi
