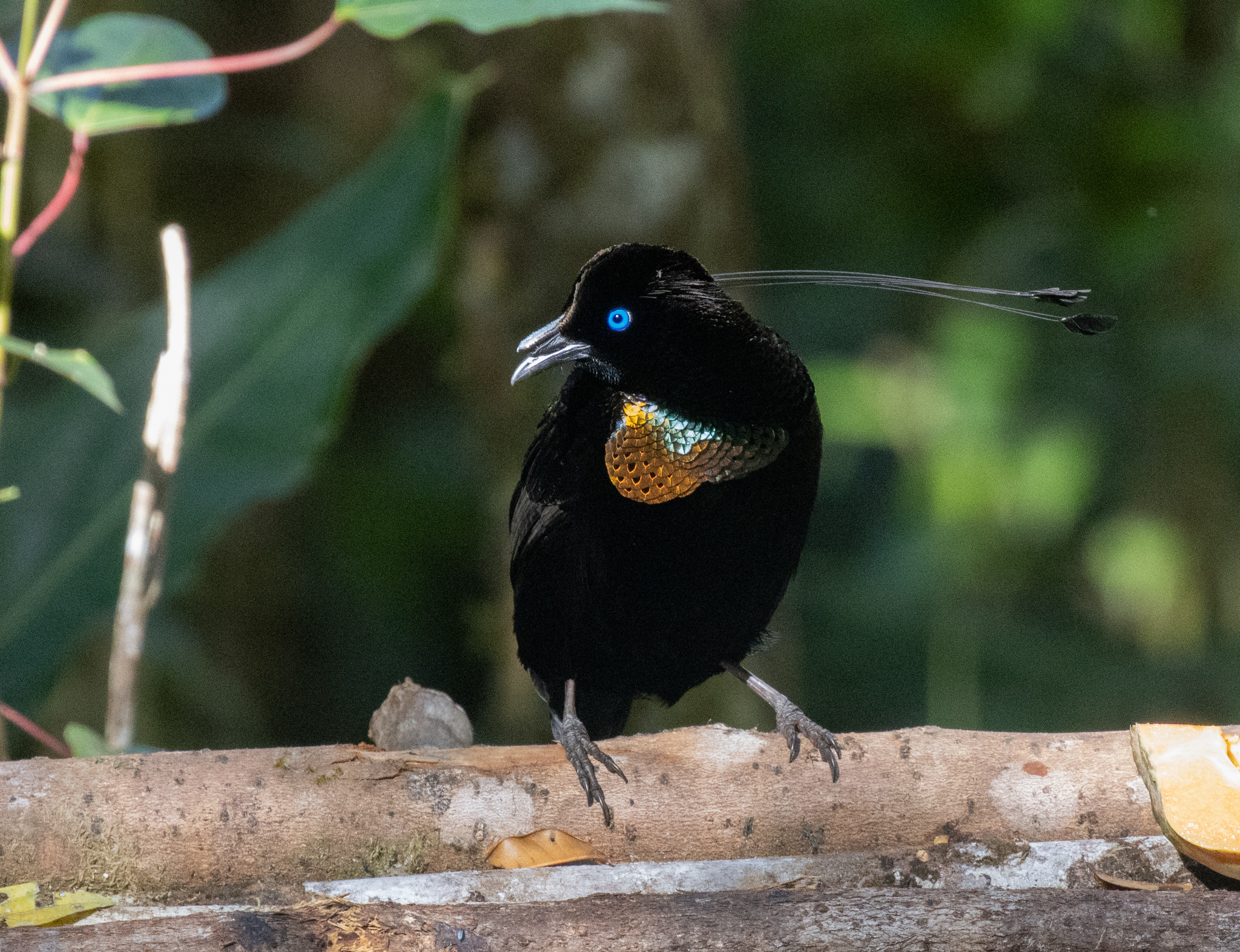
- Male
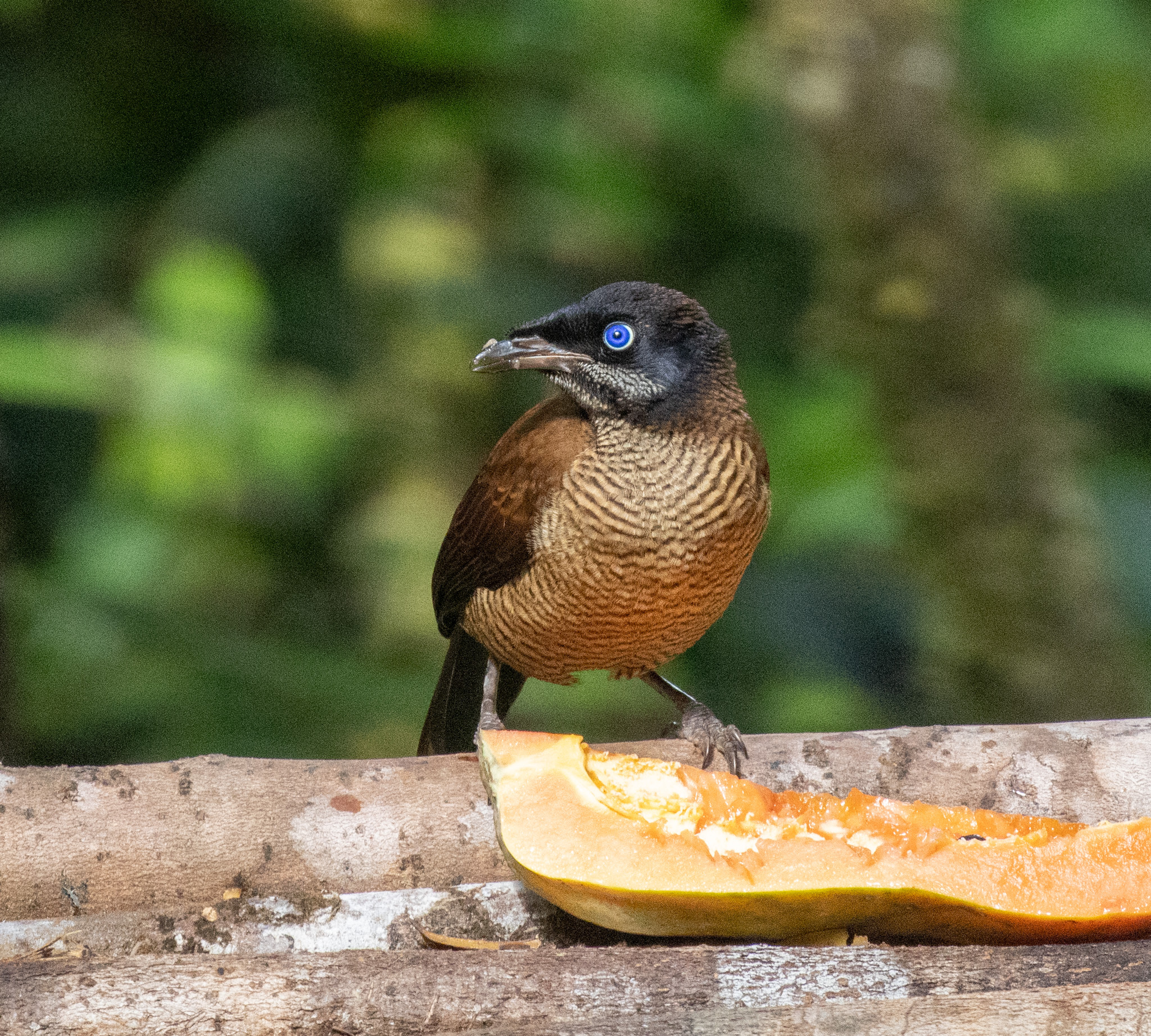
- Female

Conservation status
- Least Concern (IUCN 3.1)

Scientific classification
- Kingdom: Animalia
- Phylum: Chordata
- Class: Aves
- Order: Passeriformes
- Family: Paradisaeidae
- Genus: Parotia
- Species: P. lawesii

Binomial name
- Parotia lawesii E.P. Ramsay, 1885

= Lawes's parotia =

Species of bird

Lawes's parotia (Parotia lawesii) is a medium-sized (up to 27 cm long) passerine of the bird-of-paradise family, Paradisaeidae. It is distributed and endemic to mountain forests of southeast and eastern Papua New Guinea. Occasionally, the eastern parotia is considered a subspecies of P. lawesii. The species is similar to the western parotia (Parotia sefilata).

Like most birds of paradise, male Lawes's parotia are polygamous. The few eggs that have been studied were about 33 x 24 mm in size, but these were possibly small specimens. It eats mainly fruit, seeds and arthropods.

The bird's home was discovered by Carl Hunstein on a mountain near Port Moresby in 1884. Its name honors the New Guinea pioneer missionary Reverend William George Lawes.

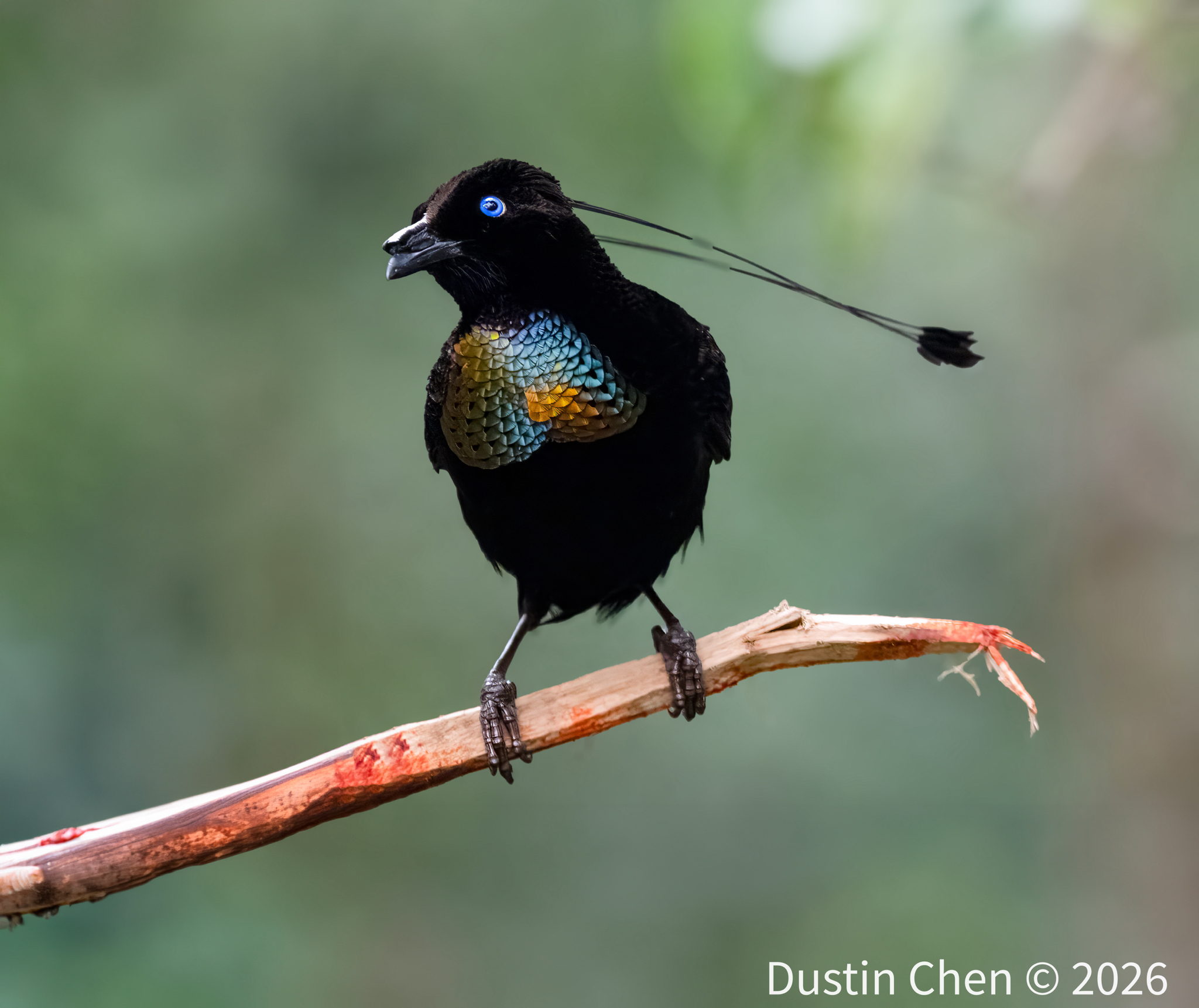
Male north of Mount Hagen

Widespread and common throughout its range, Lawes's parotia is evaluated as Least Concern on the IUCN Red List of Threatened Species. It is listed on Appendix II of CITES.

== Description ==
The male is a velvet black bird with an erectile silvery white forehead crest, iridescent purple blue nape and golden green breast plumes which are structurally colored. The breast plumes have V-shaped barbules, creating thin-film microstructures that strongly reflect two different colors, bright blue-green and orange-yellow. When the bird moves the color switches sharply between these two colors, rather than drifting iridescently. During courtship, the male bird systematically makes small movements to attract females, so the structures must have evolved through sexual selection.

The inside of its mouth is lime-colored. Adorned with three ornamental spatule head wires from behind of each eye and elongated black flank feathers, that spread skirt-like in courtship display. The female is a brown bird with dark head, yellow iris and dark-barred yellowish brown below. The iris is colored in various amounts of blue and yellow, changing according to the bird's mood.

== Sources ==
- Mackay, Margaret D. (1990): The Egg of Wahnes' Parotia Parotia wahnesi (Paradisaeidae). Emu 90(4): 269.
- Scholes III, Edwin (2008): Structure and composition of the courtship phenotype in the bird of paradise Parotia lawesii (Aves: Paradisaeidae). Zoology 111(2008):260–278. doi:10.1016/j.zool.2007.07.012
- Stavenga, Doekele G.; et al. (2010): Dramatic colour changes in a bird of paradise caused by uniquely structured breast feather barbules. Proceedings of the Royal Society B 278: 2098–2104. doi:10.1098/rspb.2010.2293
