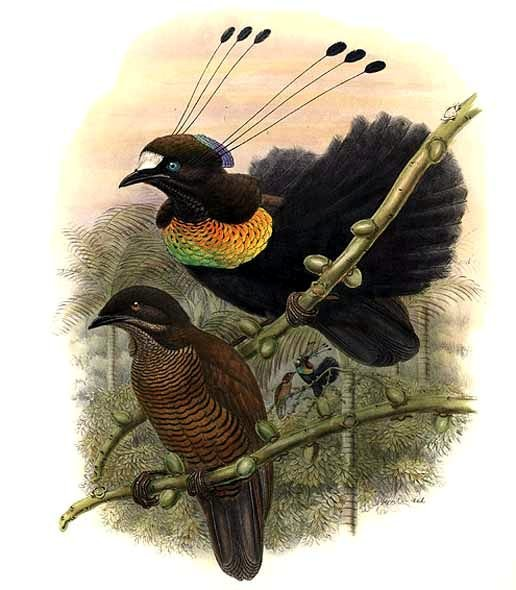
- Lawes's parotia, Parotia lawesii Male above, female below

Scientific classification
- Kingdom: Animalia
- Phylum: Chordata
- Class: Aves
- Order: Passeriformes
- Family: Paradisaeidae
- Genus: Parotia; Vieillot, 1816

Type species
- Paradisea sefilata J. R. Forster, 1781

Species
- 6; see text.

= Parotia =

Genus of birds

The parotias are a genus, Parotia, of passerine birds in the bird-of-paradise family Paradisaeidae. They are endemic to New Guinea. They are also known as six-plumed birds of paradise, due to their six head quills. These birds were featured prominently in the BBC series Planet Earth.

The males of the genus are characterized by an ornamental plumage consisting of six wired head plumes with black oval-shaped tips, a neck collar of black, decomposed feathers which can be spread into a skirt-like shape, and bright or iridescent head and throat markings. During courtship, they perform ballerina-like dances and spread out their "skirt" on a patch of forest floor they have meticulously cleaned of dead leaves and other debris. The "ballerina dances" usually consist of the male hopping from foot and bobbing their heads from side to side. The males are polygamous and do not take part in raising the young. Clutch size is somewhat uncertain; it is usually one to three eggs.

== Etymology ==
The genus name is composed of Ancient Greek παρ par, meaning "near" and ωτος ōtos for "ear", specifically meaning "curl of hair by the ear", referring to six head plumes on each side of the head, characteristic to male birds of this genus.

== Species ==
Image	Common name	Scientific name
	Western parotia	Parotia sefilata
	Carola's parotia	Parotia carolae
	Bronze parotia	Parotia berlepschi
	Lawes's parotia	Parotia lawesii
	Eastern parotia	Parotia helenae
	Wahnes's parotia	Parotia wahnesi
