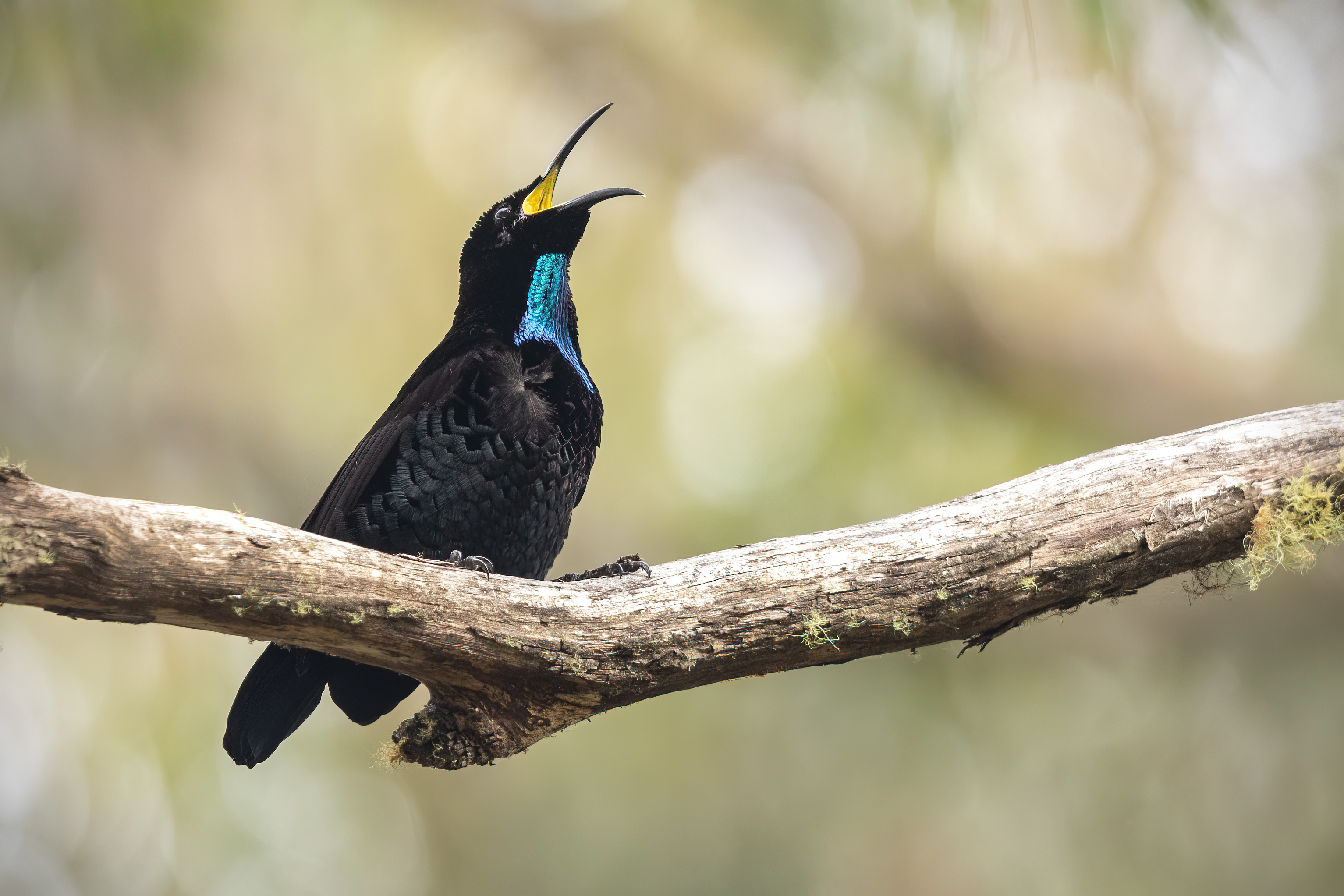

Conservation status
- Least Concern (IUCN 3.1)

Scientific classification
- Kingdom: Animalia
- Phylum: Chordata
- Class: Aves
- Order: Passeriformes
- Family: Paradisaeidae
- Genus: Ptiloris
- Species: P. paradiseus

Binomial name
- Ptiloris paradiseus Swainson, 1825
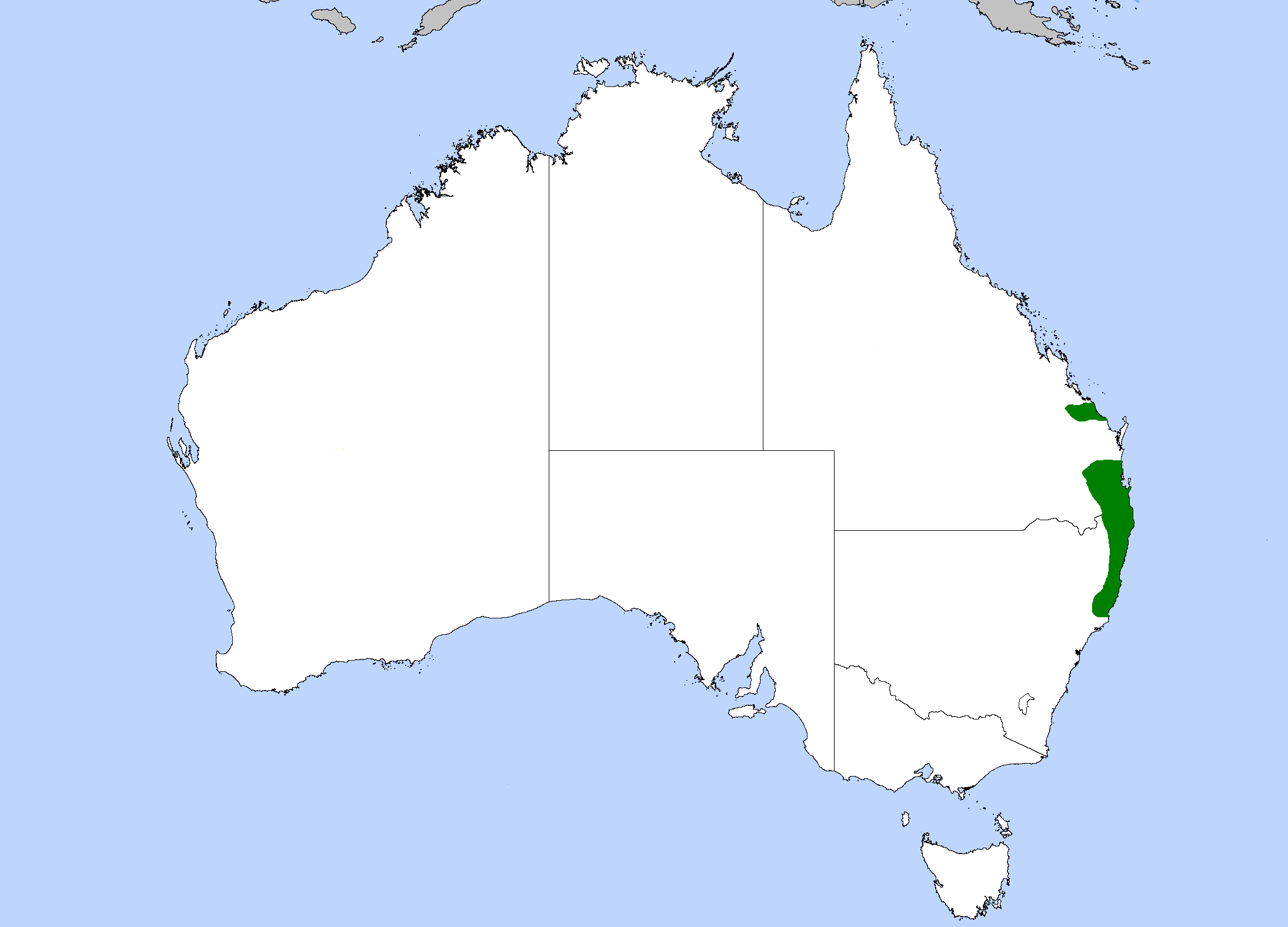
- Green indicates the range of the paradise riflebird

= Paradise riflebird =

Species of bird

The paradise riflebird (Ptiloris paradiseus) is a passerine bird of the family Paradisaeidae. It is one of four riflebird species in the genus Ptiloris. It is found in subtropical, temperate rainforests in eastern Australia. The species is sexually dimorphic; the male is black with iridescent blue-green patches, while the female is gray-brown and white.

The paradise riflebird is frugivorous and insectivorous. During breeding season, males are promiscuous and perform solitary displays for females, which involves moving rapidly from side to side with the head tilted back, showing off the neck plumage.

== Taxonomy ==
The paradise riflebird was formally described in 1825 by the English naturalist William Swainson under the current binomial name Ptiloris paradiseus. It is one of the four riflebird species that are now placed in the genus Ptiloris. The common name "riflebird" comes from the likeness of their black velvety plumage to the uniform of the British Army Rifle Brigade.

There are no recognised subspecies of the paradise riflebird. It is similar in appearance to the other riflebird species, with males having similar iridescent blue-green patches and females appearing gray-brown with barred-patterned underparts.

== Description ==
The paradise riflebird is a medium-sized bird, with males averaging about 30 cm (11.8 in) in height and weighing on average 134 to 155 g (4.7 to 5.5 oz). Females are slightly smaller, averaging at 29 cm (11.4 in) and weighing on average 86 to 112 g (3.0 to 3.9 oz). Both sexes have a long, black, decurved bill, black legs, and dark brown iris.

The species is sexually dimorphic, with few similarities in plumage between males and females. The adult male is black with an iridescent greenish blue crown, throat, and central tail feathers, as well as iridescent green on the lower breast and flank. The central tail feathers are shortened, giving an appearance of blue over black along the tail. It has been suggested that some of the male's feathers are super black feathers. These feathers have been modified so that their barbules structurally absorb light, unlike normal black feathers, which emphasizes a darker appearance. These specialized feathers are found adjacent to brightly colored patches, suggesting that they help create optical illusions during courtship displays by exaggerating the bright colors they are juxtaposed to.

The adult female is gray-brown, with rufous coloration on the primary and secondary wing feathers, save for a white streak on the supercilium, white throat, and lighter brown with a barred pattern running down the breast, flanks, and belly. Compared to the male, the adult female has a notably longer, more decurved bill.

There has been little record of juvenile appearance. Juveniles of both sexes resemble the adult female, with gray-brown feathers.

Like the Victoria's riflebird and the growling riflebird, the paradise riflebird has a growling voice. The male is known for its powerful "yaassss" call, often repeated once at a time and lasting around 2 seconds.

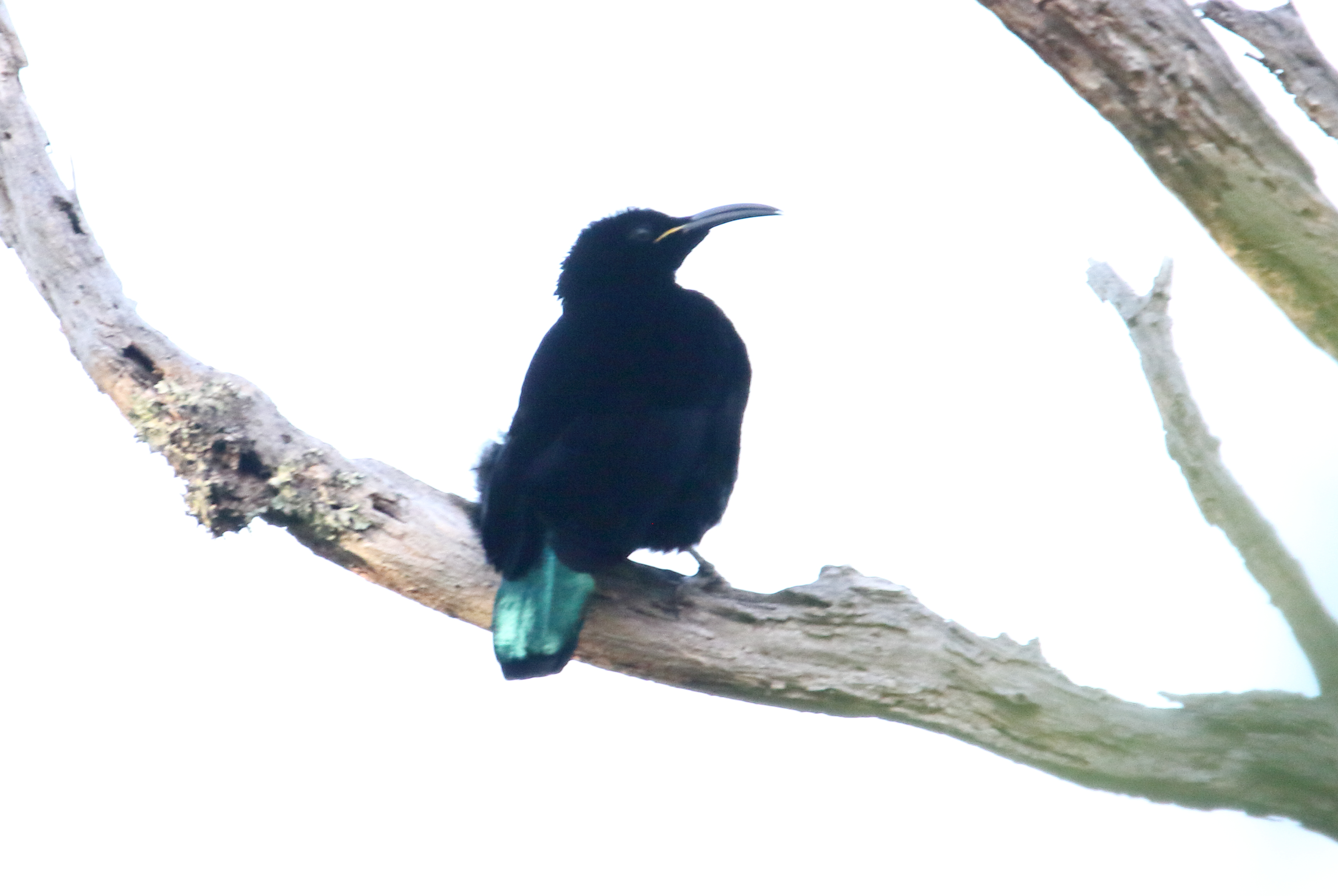
Male paradise riflebird perching

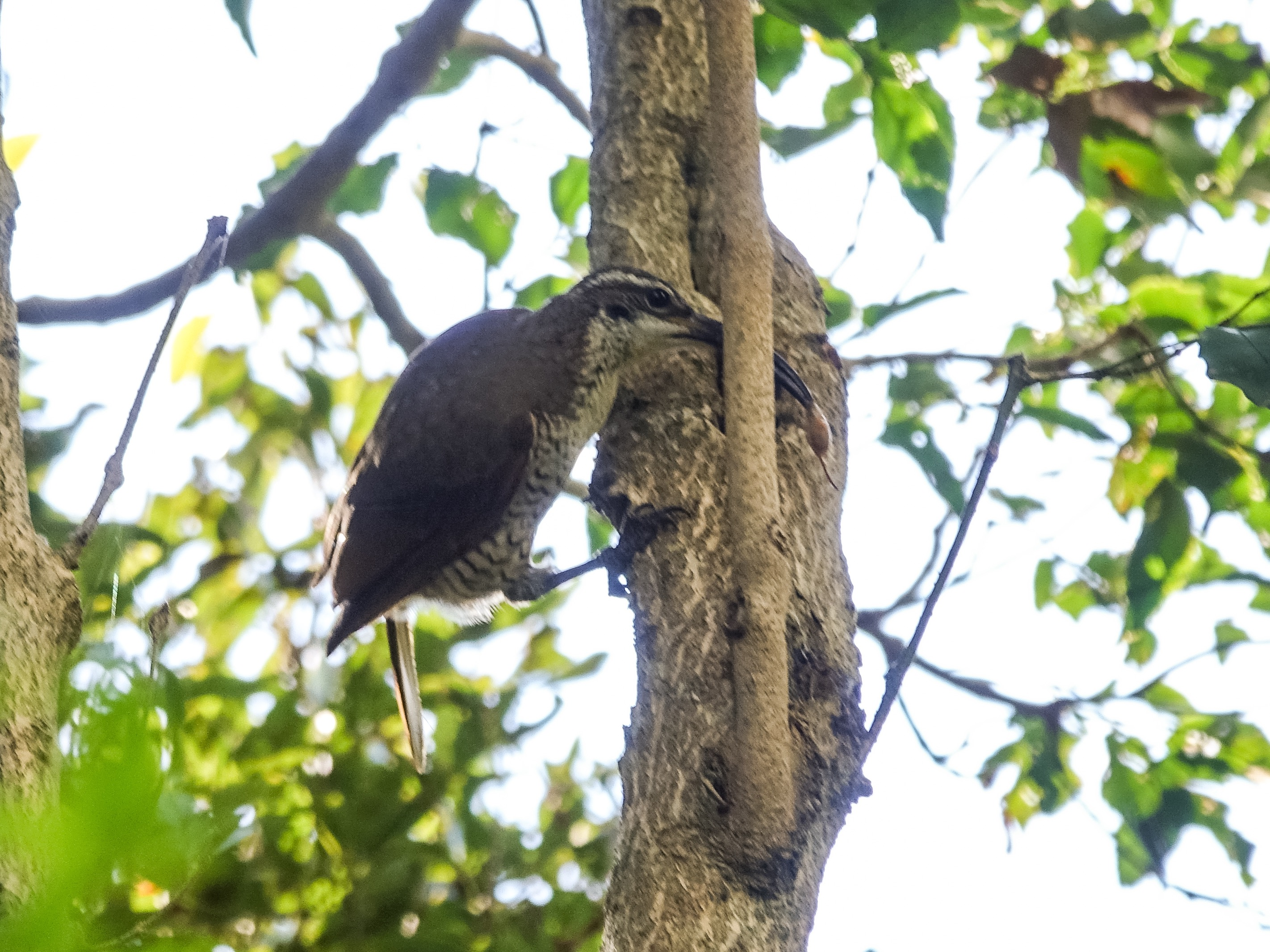
Adult female paradise riflebird in Queensland, Australia

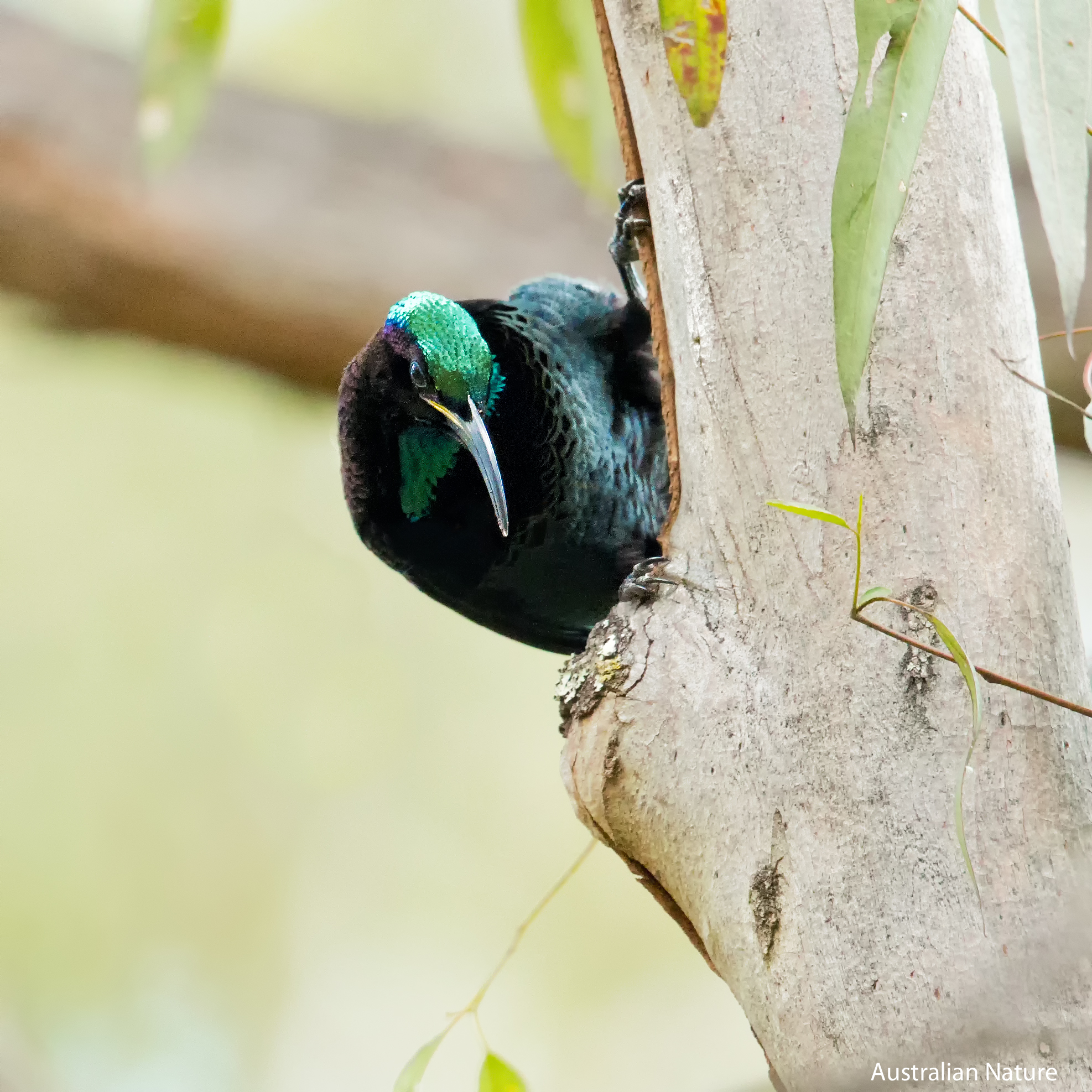
Paradise riflebird pauses for a brief moment while searching for insects

== Distribution and habitat ==
The paradise riflebird is endemic to eastern Australia, from New South Wales to Queensland, where it inhabits rainforests. It resides in the rainforest canopy, above 500 m (1,640 ft) in elevation, though has been known to move to lower elevations, sometimes below 200 m (656 ft), in winter. It is primarily a sedentary species with a low population density. However, it has been known to migrate locally, moving from wet rainforests to nearby sclerophyll forests.

== Ecology and behavior ==
The paradise riflebird mainly feeds on insects and fruit, high in the forest canopy. Occasionally, individuals may form foraging aggregations of 6-7 birds. Normally, however, it is a solitary, dispersed, non-territorial bird.

Breeding occurs from August to February, during the spring to summer months in Australia. Like other birds of paradise, the paradise riflebird is promiscuous and polygynous. The male paradise riflebird performs a solitary display to females from perches of low-hanging, exposed canopy. Although individuals of the species are generally non-territorial, males are presumed to display territorial behavior over these perches during the mating season. The courtship display is composed of rapid side-to-side movements of the wings, which are held horizontally similar to other riflebirds, and head, with a gaping mouth and the iridescent blue-green sheen on the throat exposed. It is also suggested that males have super black feathers which help to create an optical illusion during courtship that emphasizes the iridescent patches they are adjacent to.

The female paradise riflebird raises offspring alone. Paradise riflebird nests are comparable to Victoria's riflebird nests in shape, but are larger and bulkier. Clutch size, on average, is 2 eggs.

== Status and relationship to humans ==
The paradise riflebird has been hunted by humans for its plumage. It is highly vulnerable to deforestation and rainforest fragmentation due to its sedentary lifestyle and low population density, and has lost much of its original habitat. Currently, it is listed as a species of Least Concern, though its numbers are declining.

== Gallery ==
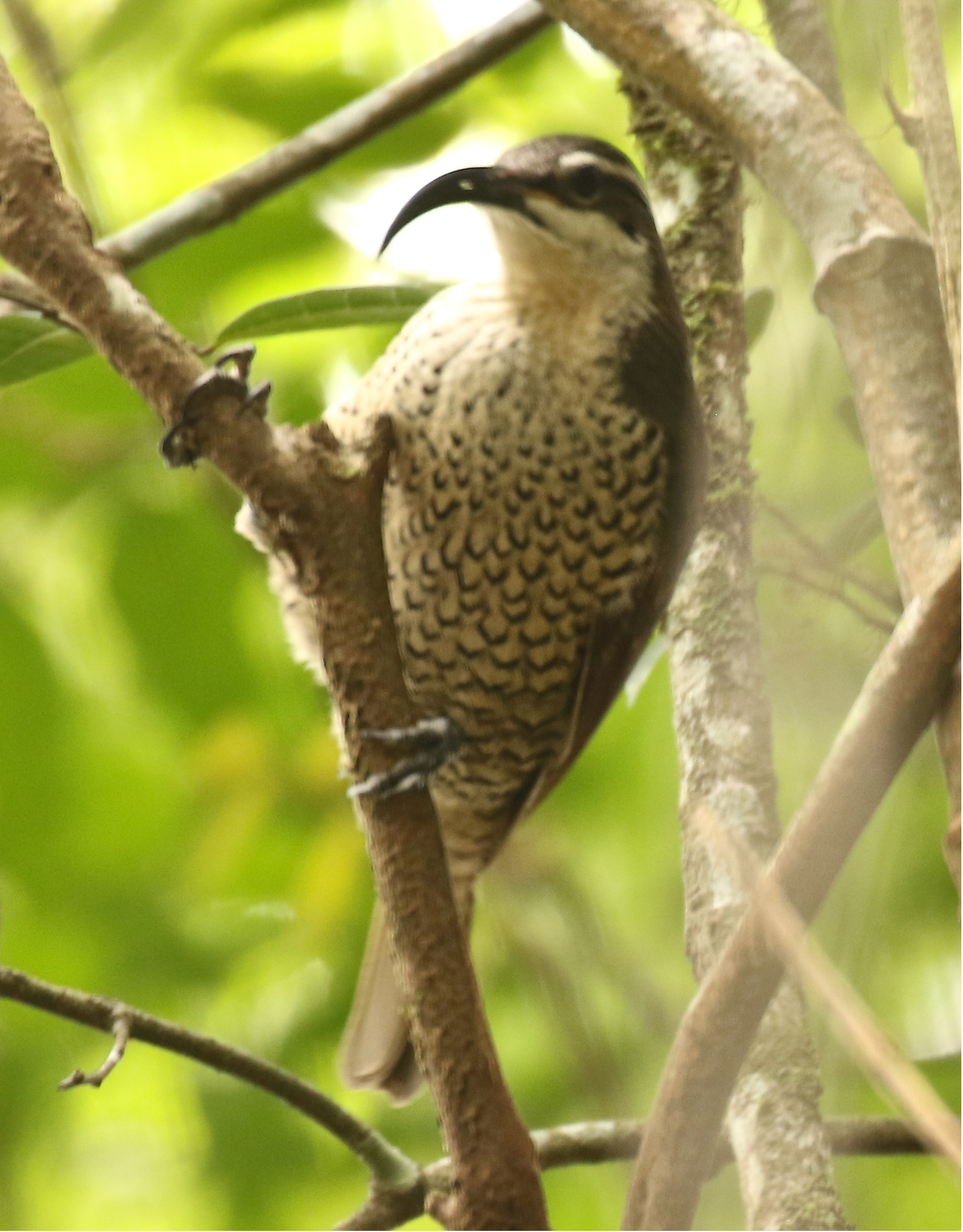
Female in Lamington National Park

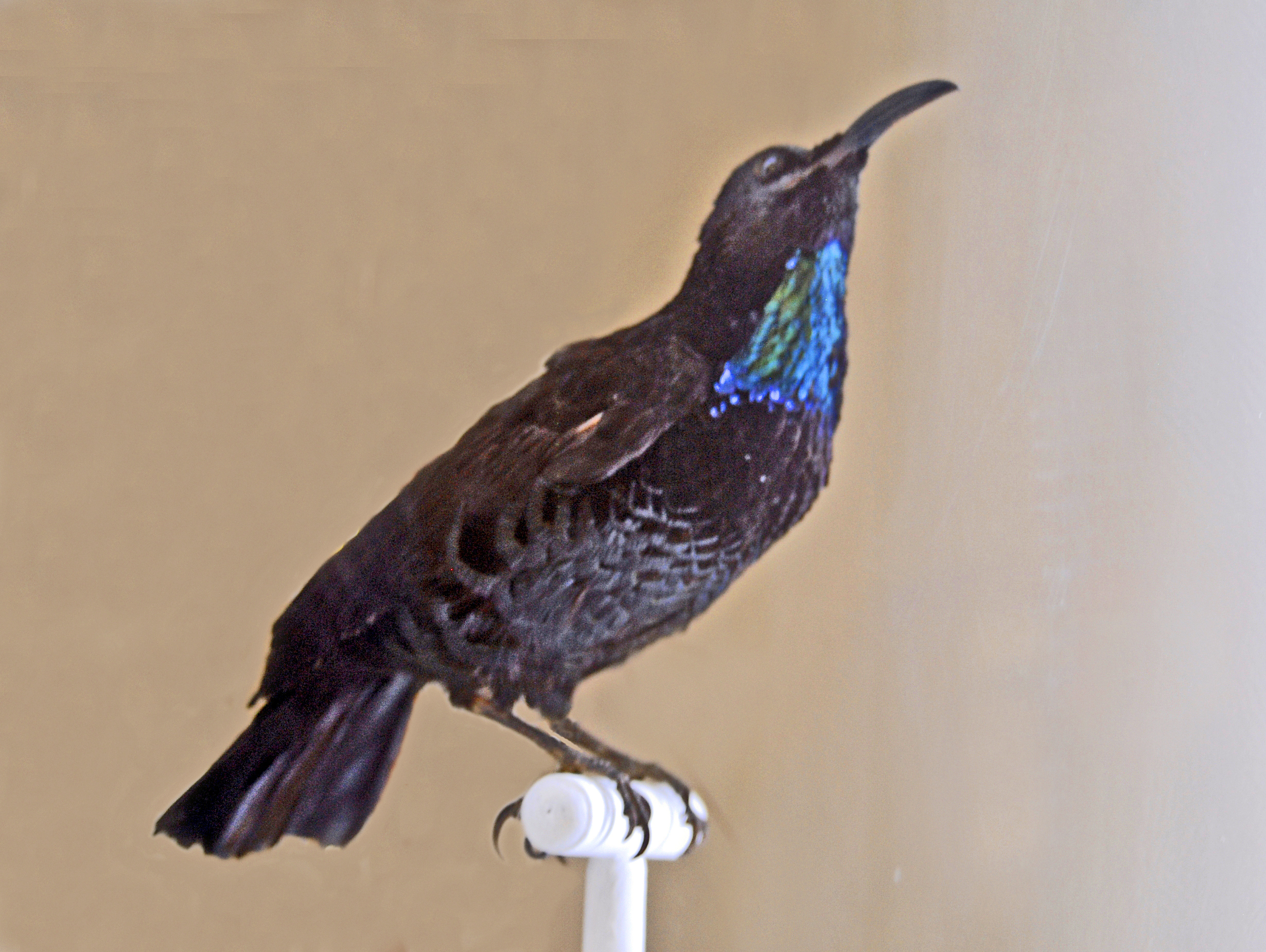
Ptiloris paradiseus. Museum specimen

Paradise Riflebird from Maleny, SE Queensland
