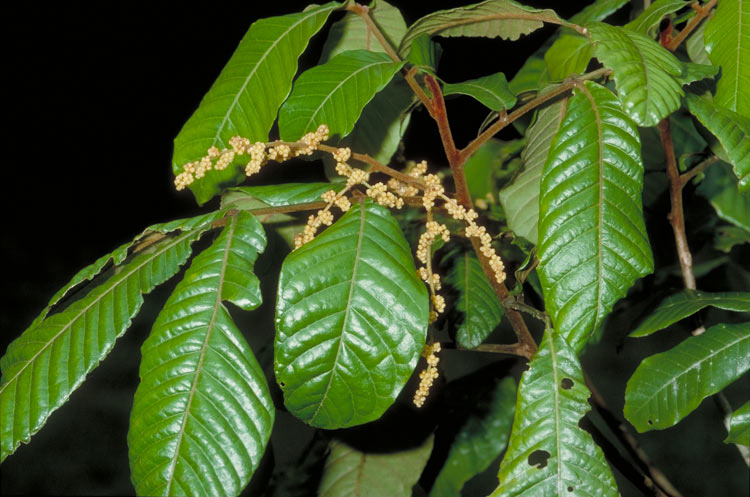
- Inflorescence and foliage

Conservation status
- Least Concern (NCA)

Scientific classification
- Kingdom: Plantae
- Clade: Tracheophytes
- Clade: Angiosperms
- Clade: Eudicots
- Clade: Rosids
- Order: Sapindales
- Family: Meliaceae
- Genus: Aglaia
- Species: A. ferruginea

Binomial name
- Aglaia ferruginea C.T. White & W.D.Francis

= Aglaia ferruginea =

Rusty amoora

Species of flowering plant

Aglaia ferruginea, commonly known as rusty boodyarra or rusty Aglaia, is a plant in the mahogany family Meliaceae that is native to northern Queensland, Australia. The name A. tomentosa has been misapplied to the species in the past.

== Description ==
Aglaia ferruginea is a small tree growing to a height of about 15 m (49 ft). Branchlets, twigs, leaf stems (petioles), midribs of the compound leaves, floral and fruiting structures, and the fruit itself are all covered in a dense indumentum of red-brown to orange-brown hairs, while other parts such as the lower leaf surfaces have a more moderate covering. The compound leaves may reach up to 60 cm (24 in) long with between 5 and 11 leaflets, each measuring up to 15 cm (5.9 in) long by 6 cm (2.4 in) wide. The leaflets may have up to 25 pairs of lateral veins and are held on very short stalks.

The inflorescences are panicles up to 18 cm (7.1 in) long, produced from the leaf axils. They carry numerous small white or yellow flowers about 4 mm (0.2 in) long. The outer surface of the calyx is hairy while the five petals are glabrous (hairless). The fruit is, in botanical terminology, a berry, yellow or orange, indehiscent, ellipsoidal, rusty-hairy, with two locules each with one or no seed.

=== Phenology ===
Flowering occurs from October to February, and fruit ripen from August to February.

== Taxonomy ==
This species was first described by the Australian botanists Cyril Tenison White and William Douglas Francis in 1924. In 1992 a paper published by the British botanist Caroline Mary Pannell reduced this species to a synonym of Aglaia tomentosa; however, a subsequent work by the same author reinstated it to species status in 2013.

=== Etymology ===
The genus is named after Aglaea (Ancient Greek: Ἀγλαΐα), one of the three Graces of Greek mythology. The species epithet ferruginea is a Latin word meaning 'rust coloured', referring to the indumentum on the branches and leaves.

== Distribution and habitat ==
This species is found from the islands of the Torres Strait to the Atherton Tableland (including the adjacent coastal area). It is an understorey tree in well developed rainforest, at altitudes up to 1,000 m (3,300 ft).

== Ecology ==
The fruit are eaten by king parrots (Alisterus scapularis) and Victoria's riflebirds (Ptiloris victoriae).

== Conservation ==
This species is listed by the Queensland Government's Department of Environment, Science and Innovation as least concern. As of 21 March 2024, it has not been assessed by the International Union for Conservation of Nature (IUCN).

== Gallery ==
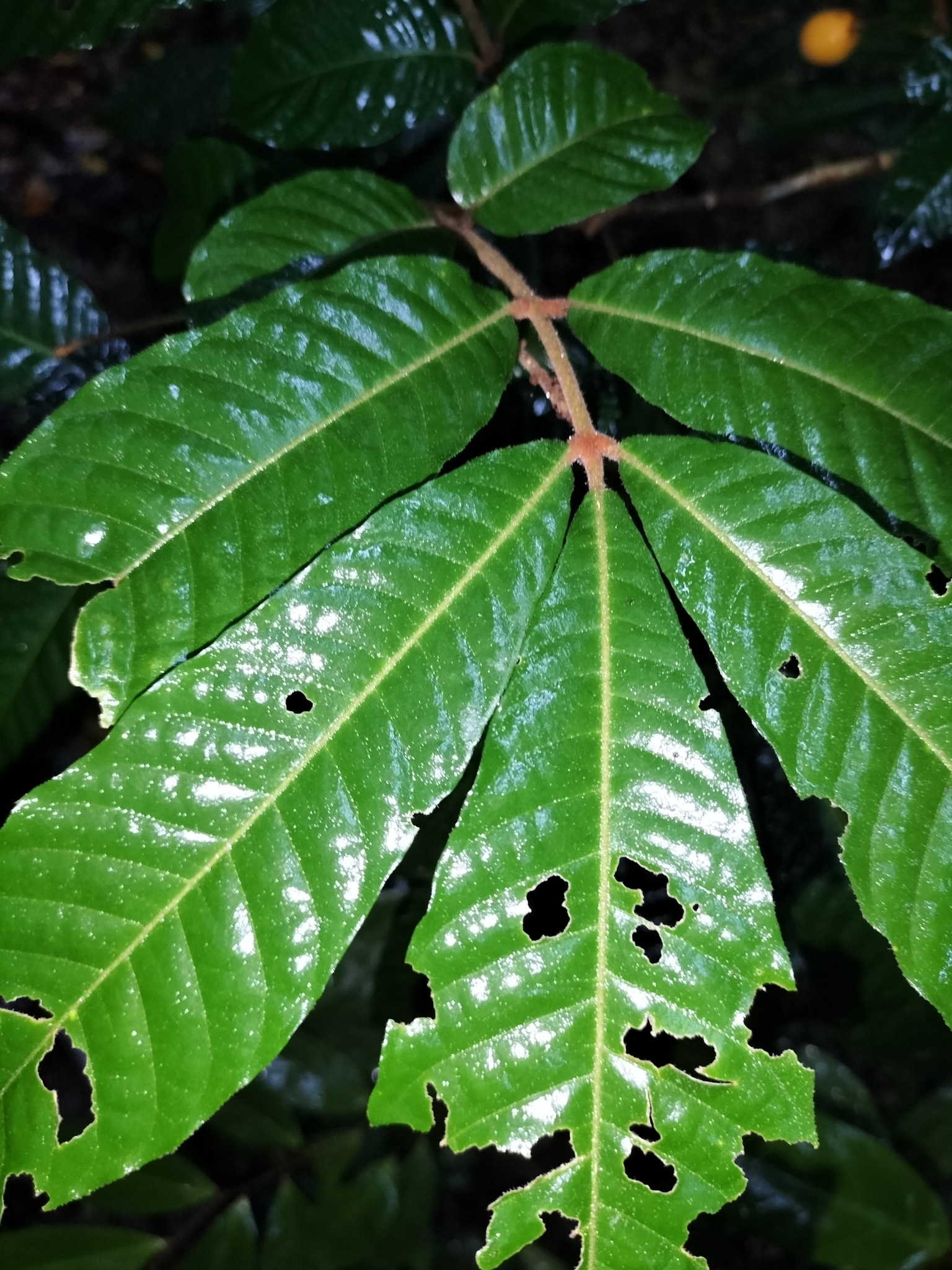
Foliage

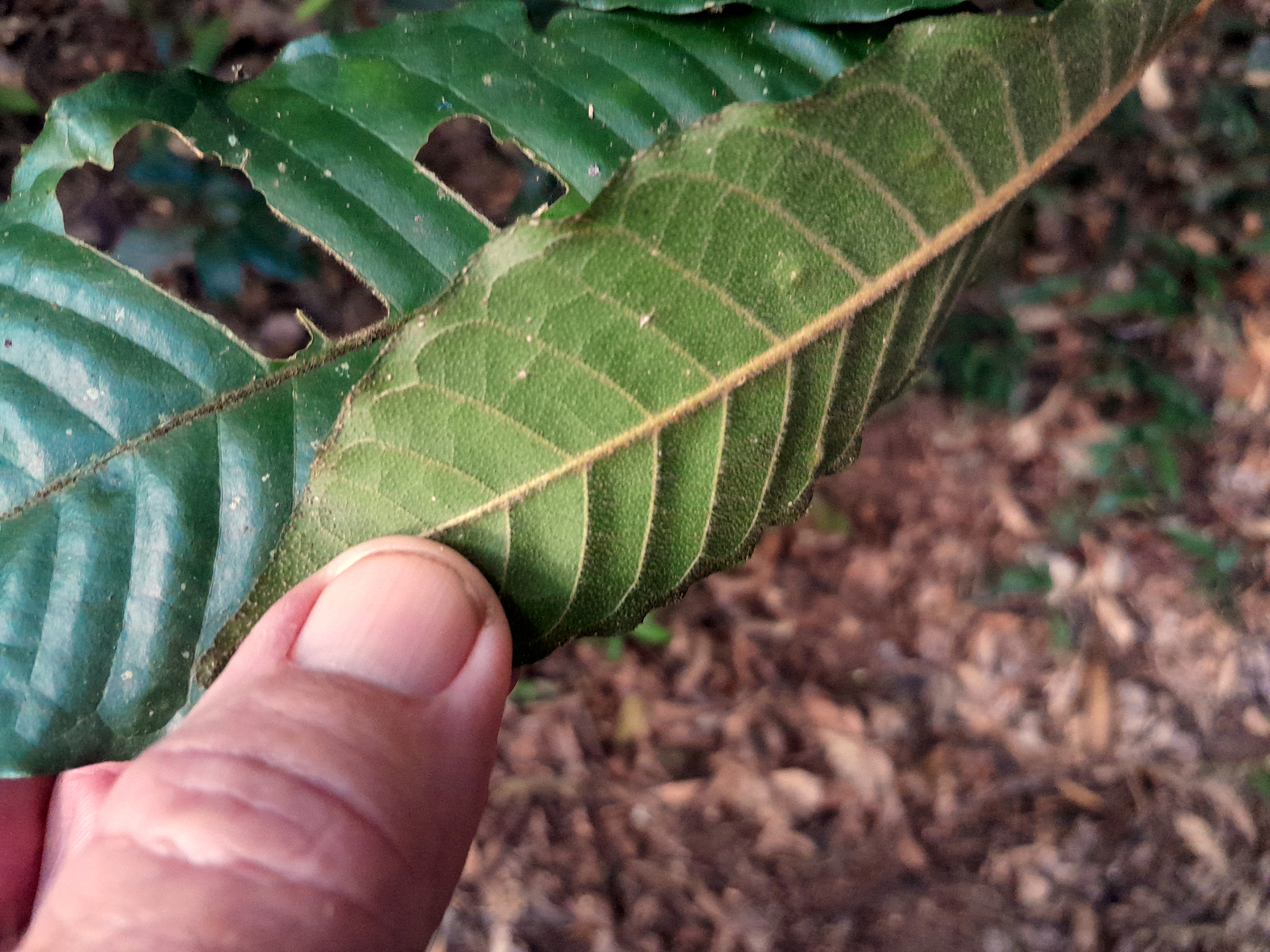
Underside of leaf

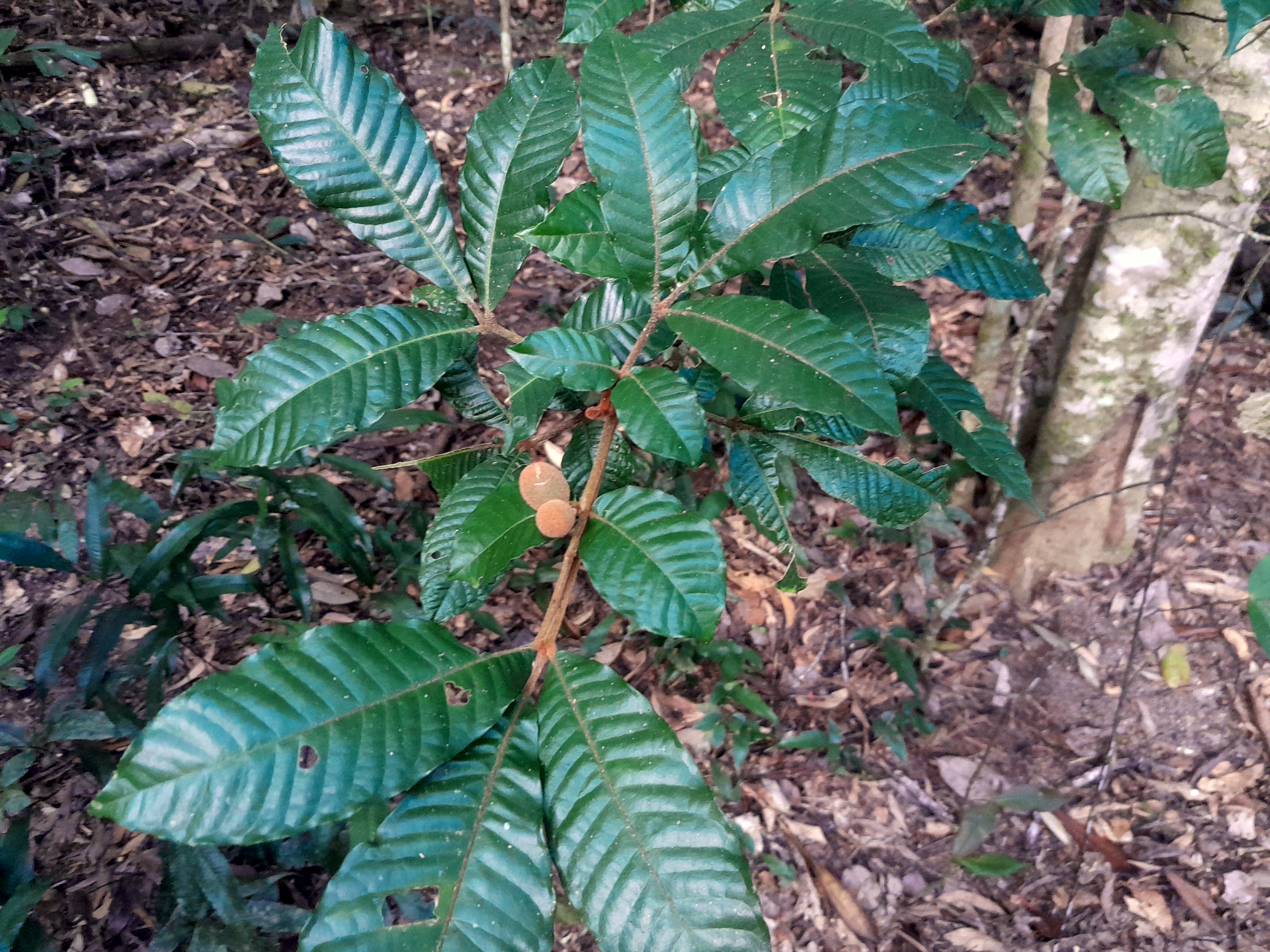
Fruit on a small tree

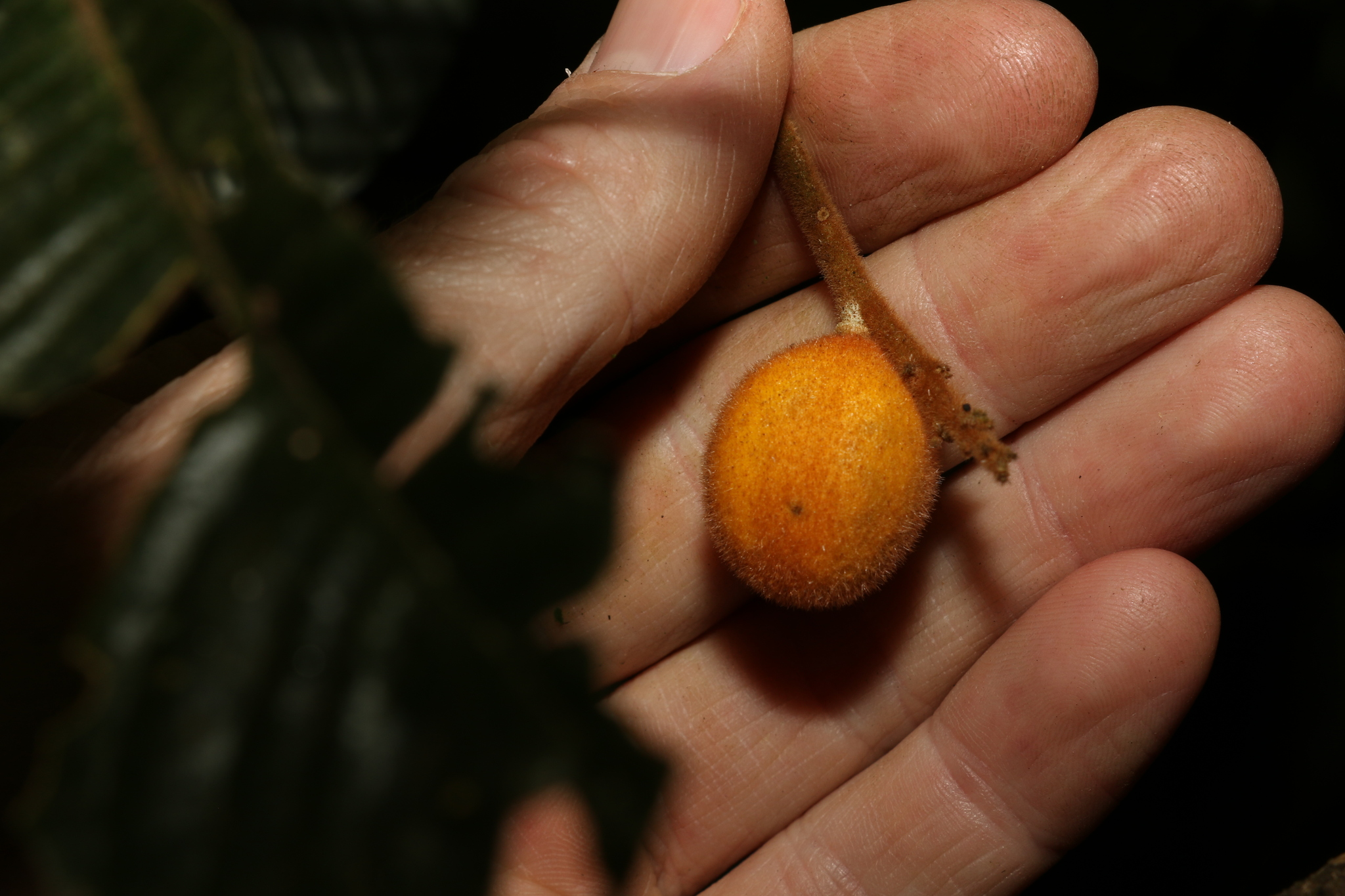
Close-up of fruit

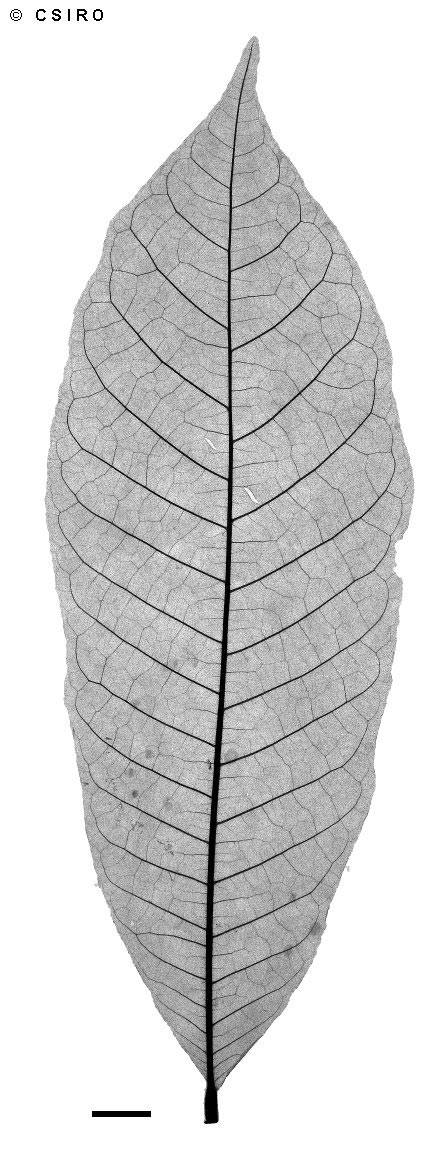
X-ray of leaf
