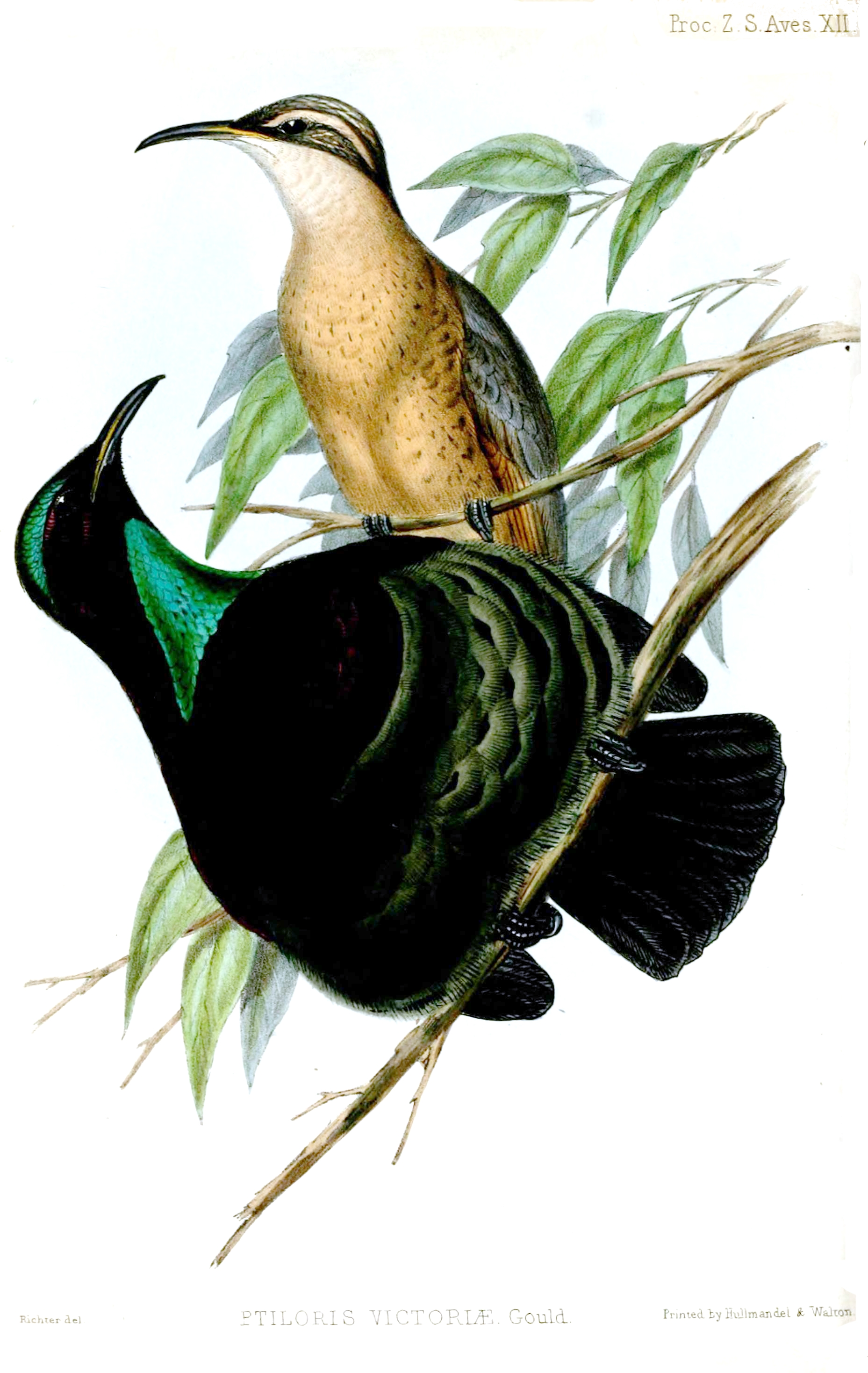
- Ptiloris victoriae

Scientific classification
- Kingdom: Animalia
- Phylum: Chordata
- Class: Aves
- Order: Passeriformes
- Family: Paradisaeidae
- Genus: Ptiloris; Swainson, 1825

Type species
- Ptiloris paradiseus (paradise riflebird) Swainson, 1825

Species
- See text

= Ptiloris =

Genus of birds

The genus Ptiloris consists of four allopatric species of birds in the family Paradisaeidae. These birds of paradise are commonly known as riflebirds, so named for the likeness of their black velvety plumage to the uniform of the Rifle Brigade. Alternatively, the bird's cry is similar to a rifle being fired and hitting its target but a call like this is not commonly reported (see Behaviour and Ecology). They are distributed in the rainforests of New Guinea and Eastern Australia.

== Taxonomy and systematics ==
The genus Ptiloris was introduced in 1825 by the English naturalist William Swainson for a single species, the paradise riflebird. This is now the type species. The genus name, Ptiloris [pronounced TI-lo-ris], means "feather nose" from the Greek ptilon (feather or down) and rhis (nostril). It refers to the frontal feathers hiding the nostrils.

The genus is part of the bird-of-paradise family, Paradisaeidae, in the order Passeriformes (songbirds). The four species are the magnificent riflebird (P. magnifica (Vieillot 1819) – magnificent or splendid), growling riflebird (P. intercedens Sharpe 1882 – referring to its distribution between the two subspecies of P. magnifica), paradise riflebird (P. paradisea, Swainson 1825 – paradise) and Victoria's riflebird (P. victoriae Gould 1849 – after Queen Victoria). Two subspecies of P. magnifica are recognised: P. m. magnifica (Vieillot 1819) and P. m. alberti Elliot 1871; the growling riflebird is often considered a subspecies of P. magnifica as well. The subspecies have been named on the basis of distribution (see Habitat and Distribution), male attention-attracting call (see Behaviour and Ecology), and cladistic analysis.

The birds of paradise are thought to have originated 24–30 million years ago and belong to the radiation of passerines that occurred in Australia during the last 60 million years. As Australia become more arid over the last several million years, the birds of paradise withdrew to the regional rainforests of New Guinea and eastern Australia. Ptiloris arose from this residual stock in Australia, from which one member (P. magnifica) has since spread to New Guinea. The separation in time of the Australian and the New Guinea P. magnifica determined genetically corresponds to the separation of Australia and New Guinea geographically (i.e. Torres Strait).

=== Species ===
Image	Common name	Scientific name	Distribution
	Magnificent riflebird	Ptiloris magnificus	western New Guinea and the northern Cape York Peninsula.
	Growling riflebird or eastern riflebird	Ptiloris intercedens	easternmost Papua New Guinea
	Paradise riflebird	Ptiloris paradiseus	New South Wales and central Queensland
	Victoria's riflebird	Ptiloris victoriae	northeastern Queensland, Australia

== Description ==
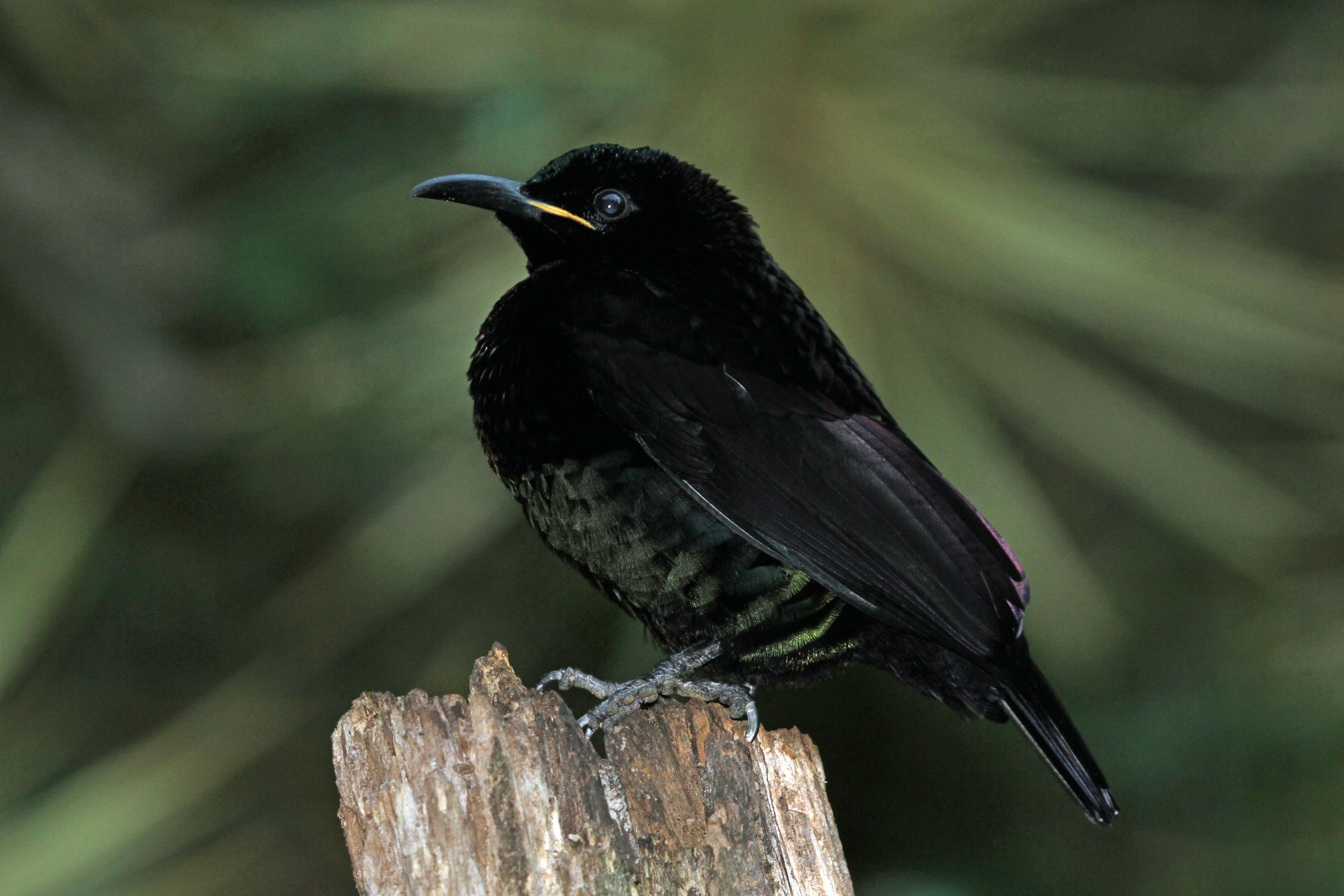
Figure 1a. Male Victoria's riflebird

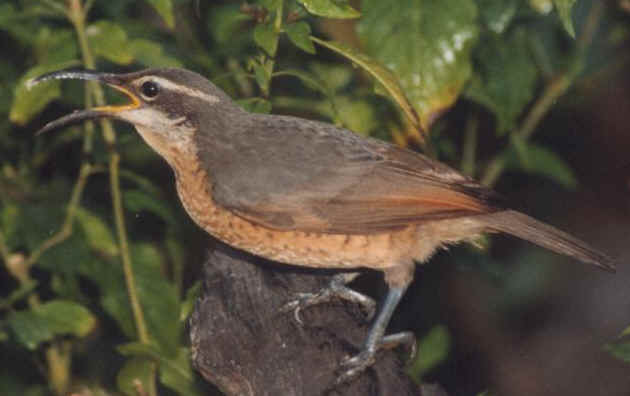
Figure 1b. Female Victoria's riflebird

Riflebirds are stocky medium-sized passerines with a small head and a characteristic long slender decurved bill. Adults have short broad wings with rounded tips, short tails, and long sturdy legs with long powerful toes and hooked claws. Like many of the birds of paradise, adult riflebirds are sexually dimorphic, with adult males being entirely velvety black and females being mostly shades of brown. Adult females are also slightly smaller and have longer bills. Adult males are larger in P. magnifica (31 cm long, 160g; P. intercedens is similarly sized), smaller in P. paradisea (28 cm, 135g), and smallest in P. victoriae (22 cm, 105g).

Adult male riflebirds of the four species are similar in appearance: all are entirely velvety black with lighter underparts, iridescence on the head, upper throat and centre of the tail, and yellow mouth and gape. The iridescence on the paradise riflebird is blue, on Victoria's riflebird blue-green, and on the magnificent and growling riflebirds are green, blue, and purple. Males of the magnificent and growling riflebirds have more prominent grey-black underparts, black and yellow bands across their mid-breast, and long thin curved plumes from the lower flanks that extend to the end of the tail in P. magnifica or just short in P. intercedens.

Adult female riflebirds of the four species are also similar in appearance: all are largely brown above, have a prominent cream supercilium, and are whitish to buff with dark markings underneath. Female magnificent and growling riflebirds have thin blackish barring underneath, while paradise and Victoria's riflebirds have brown chevrons. Immature riflebirds resemble adult female birds and males do not achieve their full adult plumage until they are four to five years old.

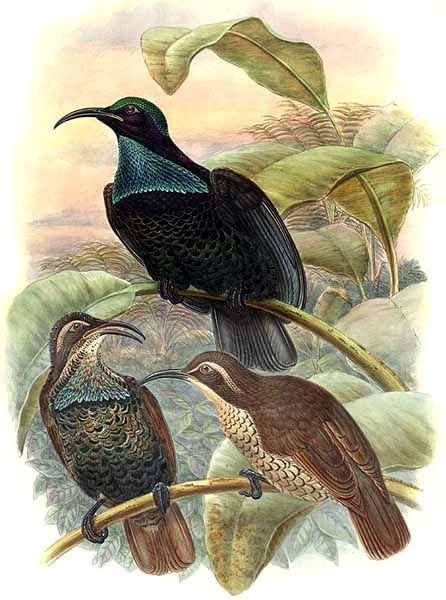
Paradise riflebird male and female

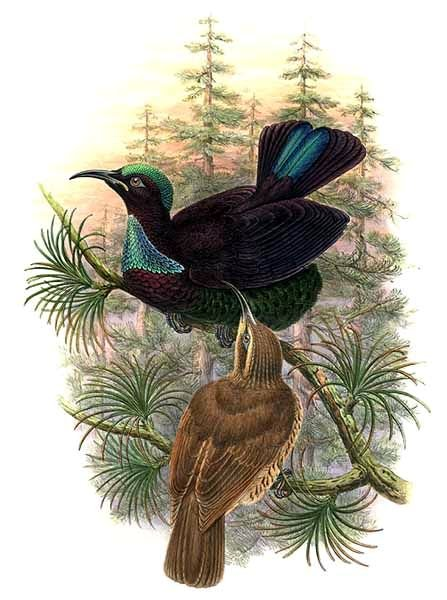
Victoria's riflebird male and female

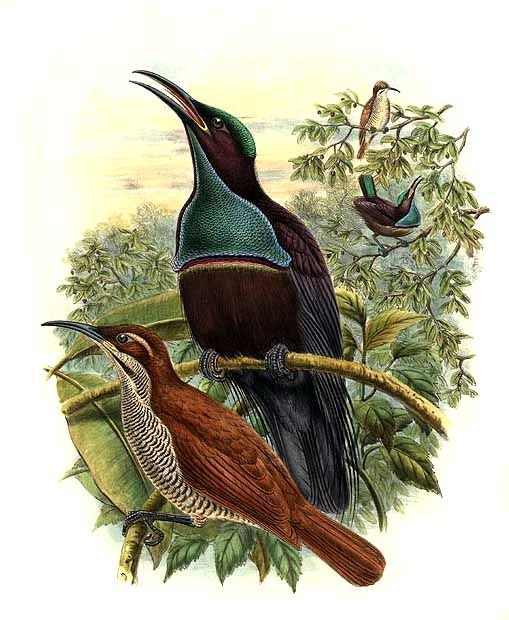
Magnificent riflebird male and female

== Distribution and habitat ==
Riflebirds are found in rainforests of eastern Australia and New Guinea up to 1500m above sea level. They also inhabit adjacent moist dense forests. Victoria's riflebird has been recorded in eucalypt and melaleuca-dominated wet sclerophyll forests and woodlands, the landward edges of mangroves and swamp woodlands, and occasionally the temperate Nothofagus forests.

The four riflebird species are separated geographically, an easy characteristic for field identification. Magnificent riflebirds are found on the Cape York Peninsula in Queensland, Australia (P. m. alberti) and the lowlands and foothills of western New Guinea (P. m. magnifica), while growling riflebirds are found in the lowlands and foothills of eastern New Guinea. Both species are largely absent from the highlands of New Guinea. Victoria's riflebirds are found on the Atherton Tablelands of Queensland, Australia, from just south of Cooktown to just south of Townsville. Paradise riflebirds are found in southeast Queensland and northeast New South Wales, Australia. Riflebirds are widespread throughout their ranges.

== Behavior and ecology ==
=== Diet and feeding ===
The few published studies on the diet of riflebirds indicate that riflebirds are predominantly insectivorous but will take fruit and seeds when available. Riflebirds are mostly arboreal with a preference for lower strata but will forage on or close to the ground. They climb up and down tree trunks and hop along horizontal branches searching for insects and their larvae, which they extract from under the bark, in crevices, and epiphytes using their chisel-like bills. Riflebirds will swallow fruit whole or hold fruit between their foot and a branch and tear pieces off with their bill. While riflebirds are mostly solitary, small flocks can be seen on fruiting trees when in season. Victoria's riflebird has been reported to feed on 19 species of fruiting trees and vines. Only one reference has been made to riflebirds (P. magnifica) as a seed disperser of rainforest plants including Ficus spp. and Podocarpus spp.

When feeding their young, female riflebirds will catch proportionally more arthropods than fruit to supply their growing young with foods rich in proteins and lipids. This has also been suggested as the reason for female riflebirds having larger bills than males. Nestlings have been reported as being fed crickets, grasshoppers, spiders, cockroaches, centipedes, cicadas, woodlice, beetles, and insect larvae. Males may take proportionally more easily obtained and energy-rich fruit to allow them to display for longer.

=== Breeding ===
Like most other birds of paradise, riflebirds are polygynous, with promiscuous males displaying to and mating with several different females. Birds of paradise are well known for their elaborate courtship displays. Unlike some however, male riflebirds display alone and have been seen during the breeding season to territorially defend displaying sites. Otherwise, male riflebirds are generally tolerant of other riflebirds. The breeding season for riflebirds is generally considered to be from June to February. During the breeding season, male Victoria's riflebirds have been reported to have home ranges of 0.6 to 2.8 ha, containing up to 5 display posts. Paradise and Victoria's riflebirds select the top of a broken-off vertical tree or tree fern 10–20 cm in diameter and 10–20 metres high to display on while magnificent and growling riflebirds display on a horizontal tree branch or bough. Males can use the same display sites for many successive years.

Male riflebirds appear to rigidly follow a progression of vocalisations, postures, and movements when displaying to females. The first stage is to call from the display perch and expose their yellow gape to attract attention. Male paradise and Victoria's riflebirds make a sound like "yass," male magnificent riflebirds produce a series of low whistles, and male growling riflebirds make a growling sound (hence the name). Once a female arrives at the display site, the second stage involves the male turning to face the female, raising his wings above his head to form a circle, again exposing his gape, and raising and lowering his body on his legs. If a female approaches, the male begins the third display stage directly in front of the female described as an "alternate wing clap", lowering one wing and hiding his head behind the other and then switching from side to side in quick succession. At this stage, male magnificent and growling riflebirds may start hopping sideways along the display branch. A female riflebird signals her receptiveness by briefly fluttering her wings and the male hops onto her back before copulation. Immature males may attempt to display during the breeding season as well but they appear clumsy and uncoordinated, like they need to learn to display correctly.

Female riflebirds are solely responsible for nest construction, incubation, and feeding nestlings. They have also been observed defending their nests. The nests of Victoria's riflebirds may be parasitised by the Pacific koel (Eudynamys orientalis). The nest is a well-concealed open cup structure of leaves and twigs, at least 100mm internal diameter, and lined with leaves, plant fibres, and rootlets. Victoria's riflebird usually lays two eggs each weighing approximately 10g on consecutive days, incubates the eggs for 18 to 19 days, and broods and feeds the nestlings for 13 to 15 days. Little is known about the incubation and nestling of paradise, magnificent, and growling riflebirds. Nestlings hatch naked with their eyes closed and stay on the nest until fledging (nidicolous). Victoria's riflebird nestlings are brooded for the first six to seven days until they open their eyes and can thermoregulate and they achieve pin-break on their primary and secondary feathers by day twelve. Nestlings are fed two to three times an hour, with the female away from the nest for longer with two nestlings. Victoria's riflebird fledglings become independent from their parent after 74 days, while this period is unknown for the other species.

== Relationship with humans ==
Like most birds of paradise, riflebirds have been hunted for their plumage in the past, including for millinery. More recently, they have occasionally been considered pests for damaging cultivated fruit. While riflebirds have been shown to use habitats adjacent to rainforests, their reliance on rainforests leaves them vulnerable to forest clearing. The four species of riflebird are classified as being of "Least Concern" according to the IUCN Red List of Threatened Species. The population trends for P. paradisea and victoriae are reported as declining but not approaching the threshold for vulnerable status.
