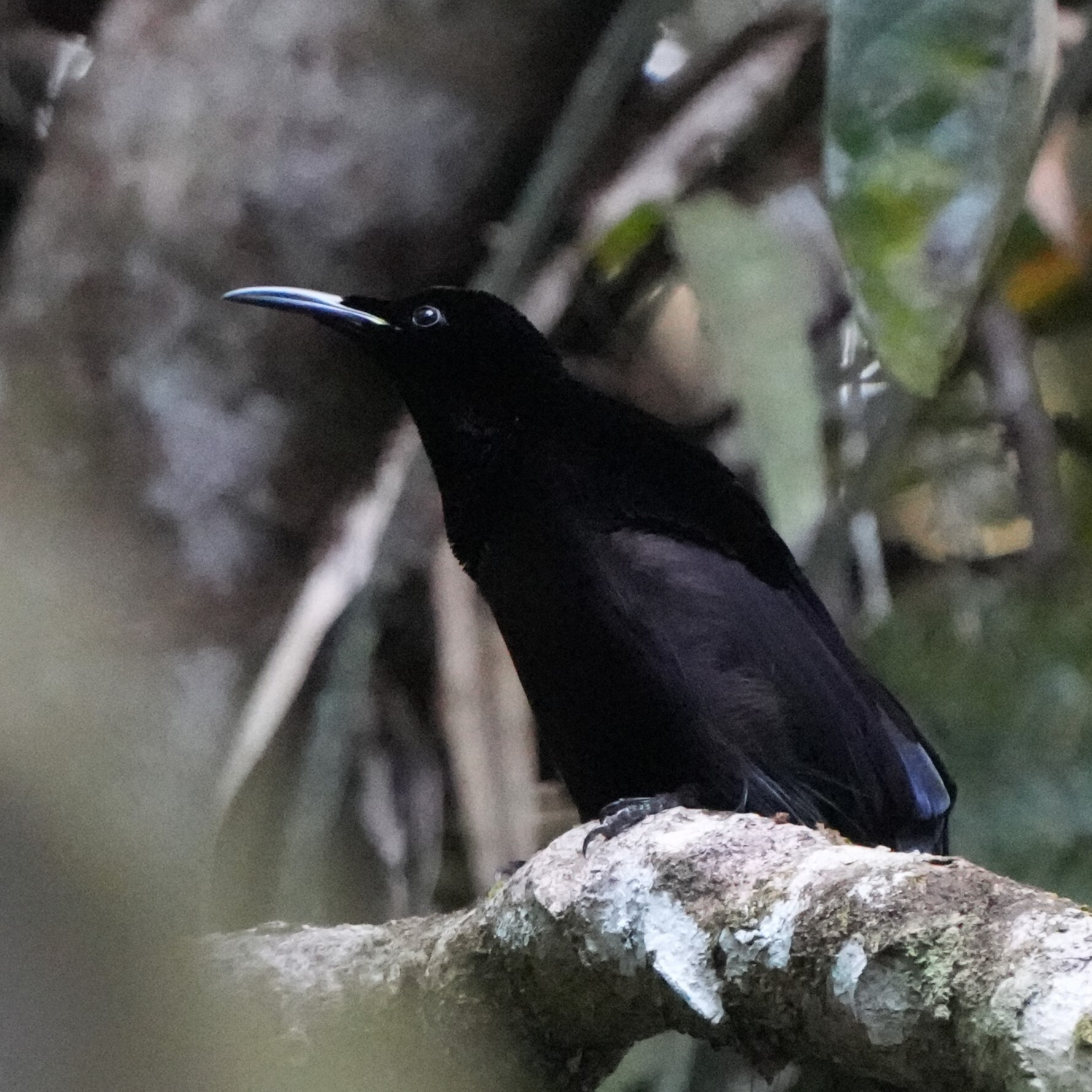
- Male
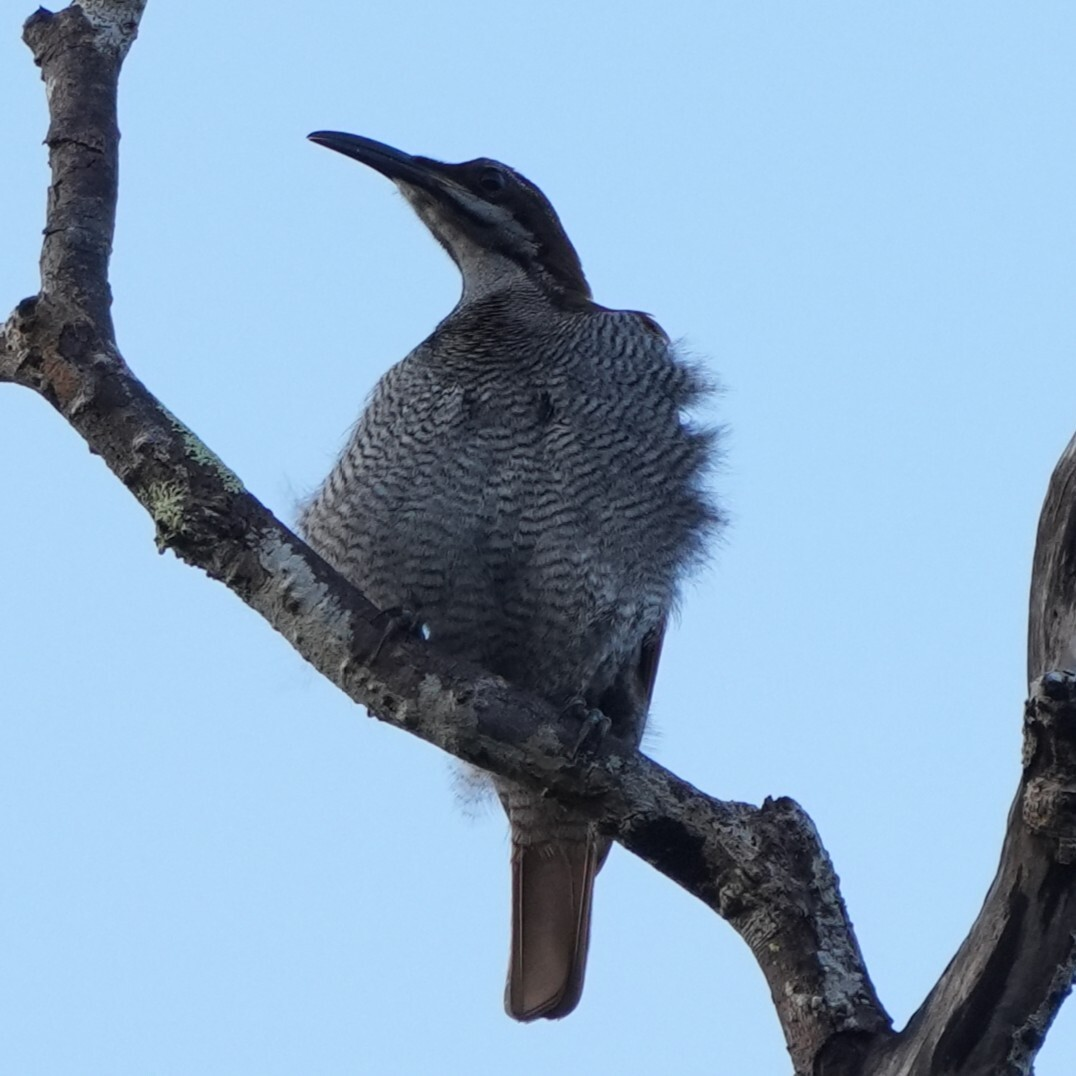
- Female

Conservation status
- Least Concern (IUCN 3.1)

Scientific classification
- Kingdom: Animalia
- Phylum: Chordata
- Class: Aves
- Order: Passeriformes
- Family: Paradisaeidae
- Genus: Ptiloris
- Species: P. intercedens

Binomial name
- Ptiloris intercedens Sharpe, 1882

Synonyms
- Lophorina intercedens; Ptiloris magnificus intercedens

= Growling riflebird =

Species of bird

The growling riflebird (Ptiloris intercedens), also known as the eastern riflebird, is a medium-sized passerine bird of the family Paradisaeidae.

The growling riflebird is endemic to the lowlands of easternmost Papua New Guinea. The male is polygamous and performs its courtship display solitarily. The diet consists mainly of fruits and arthropods.

A common species throughout its range, the growling riflebird is evaluated as being of least concern on the IUCN Red List of Threatened Species. It is listed on Appendix II of CITES.

The common name "riflebird" comes from the likeness of their black velvety plumage to the uniform of the British Army Rifle Brigade.

== Description ==
The male is a velvet black and green bird-of-paradise with black flank plumes, black curved bill, yellow mouth, blackish feet and dark brown iris. It has an iridescent greenish blue on its crown, throat, breast shield and central tail feathers. The female is a rufous brown bird with barred buff below.

Its appearance resembles, and it is sometimes considered to be a subspecies of the magnificent riflebird. It is differentiated by the lower breast and abdomen coloration, the male's distinctive growling song, and feathered culmen base.
