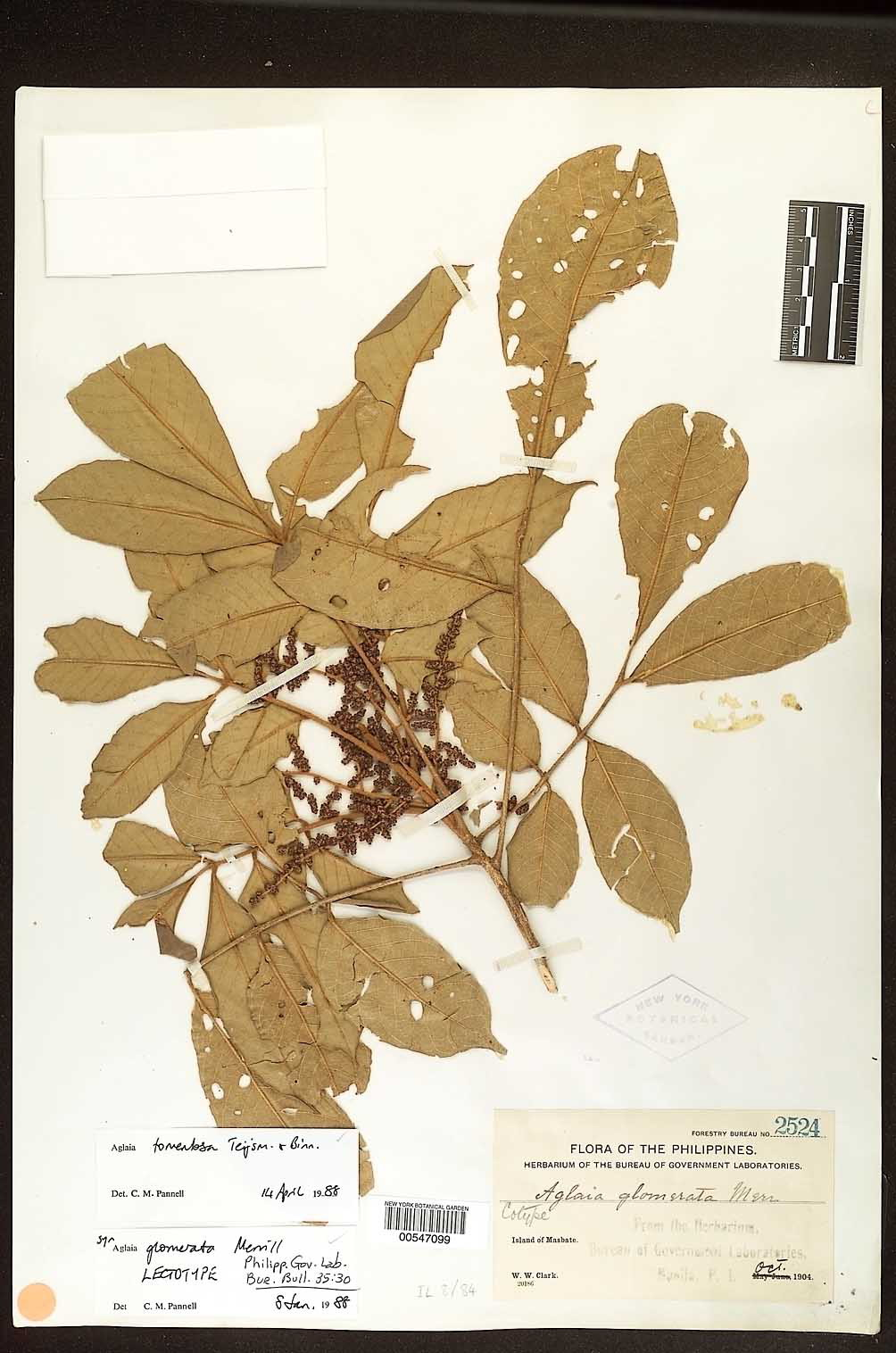
- Herbarium specimen of Aglaia tomentosa

Conservation status
- Least Concern (IUCN 2.3)

Scientific classification
- Kingdom: Plantae
- Clade: Tracheophytes
- Clade: Angiosperms
- Clade: Eudicots
- Clade: Rosids
- Order: Sapindales
- Family: Meliaceae
- Genus: Aglaia
- Species: A. tomentosa

Binomial name
- Aglaia tomentosa Teijsm.& Binn.

= Aglaia tomentosa =

Species of flowering plant

Aglaia tomentosa is a species of plant in the mahogany family Meliaceae. It is found in Brunei, India, Indonesia, Laos, Malaysia, the Philippines, Singapore, and Vietnam.
