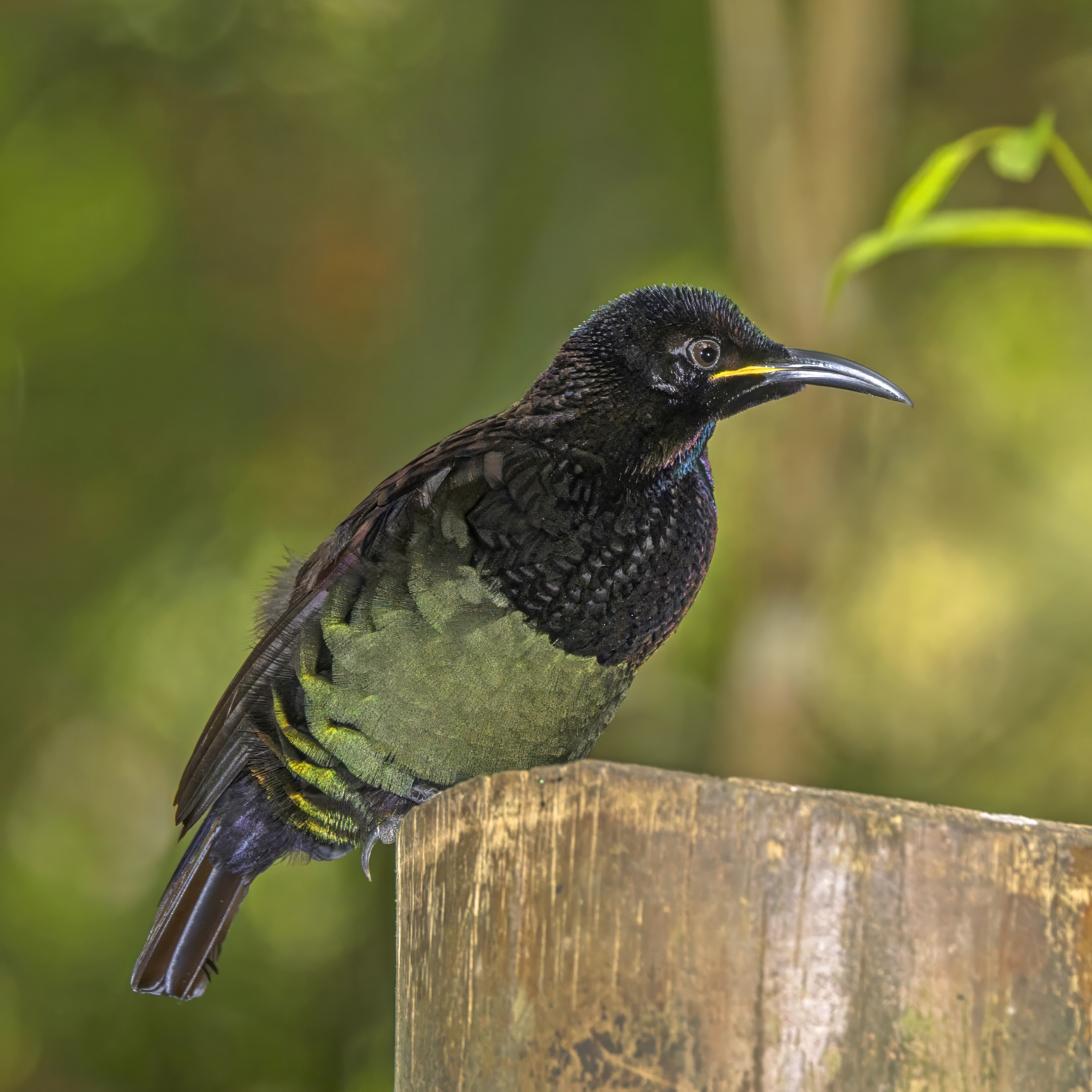
- Male
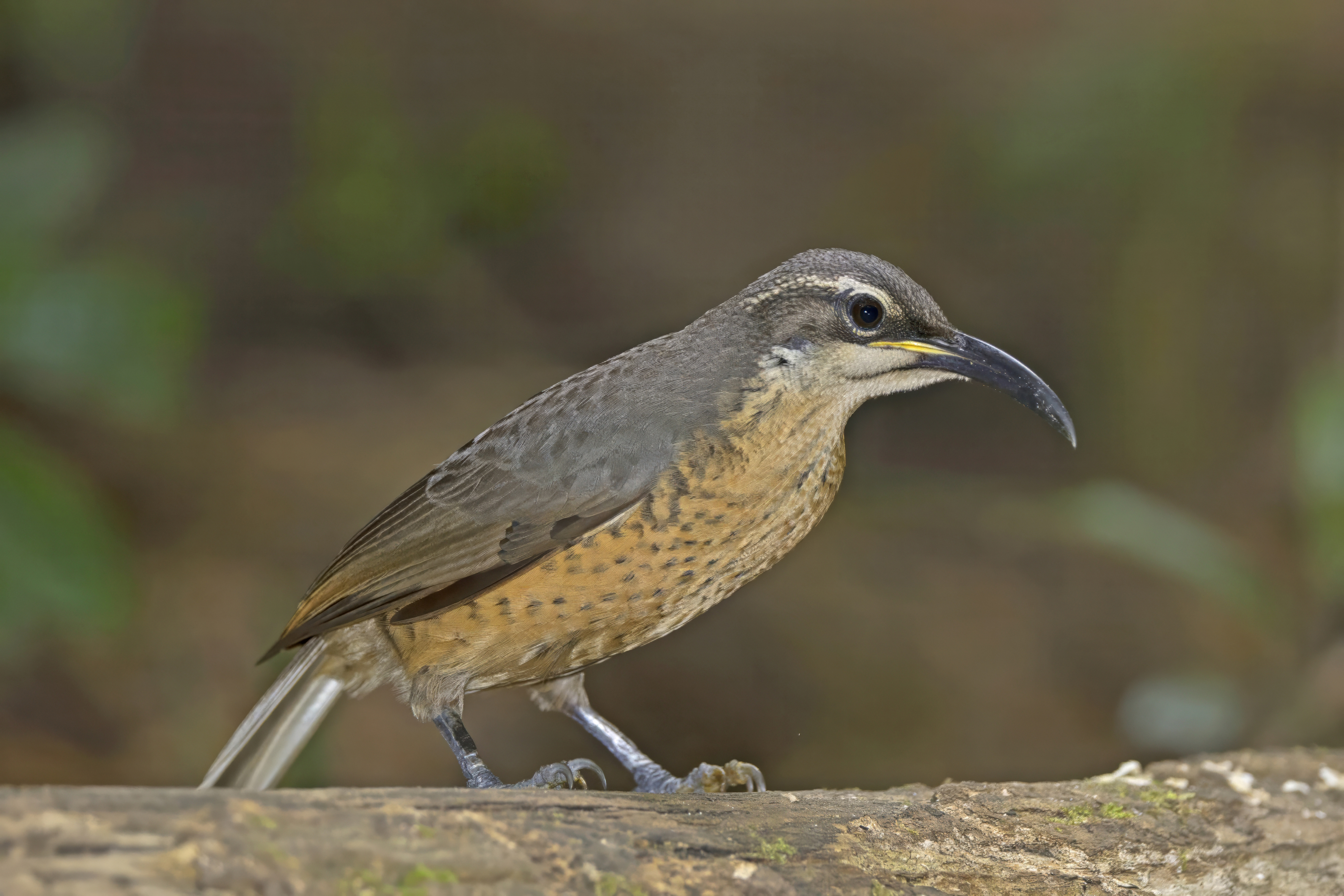
- Female; Atherton Tableland, Queensland

Conservation status
- Vulnerable (IUCN 3.1)

Scientific classification
- Kingdom: Animalia
- Phylum: Chordata
- Class: Aves
- Order: Passeriformes
- Family: Paradisaeidae
- Genus: Ptiloris
- Species: P. victoriae

Binomial name
- Ptiloris victoriae Gould, 1850
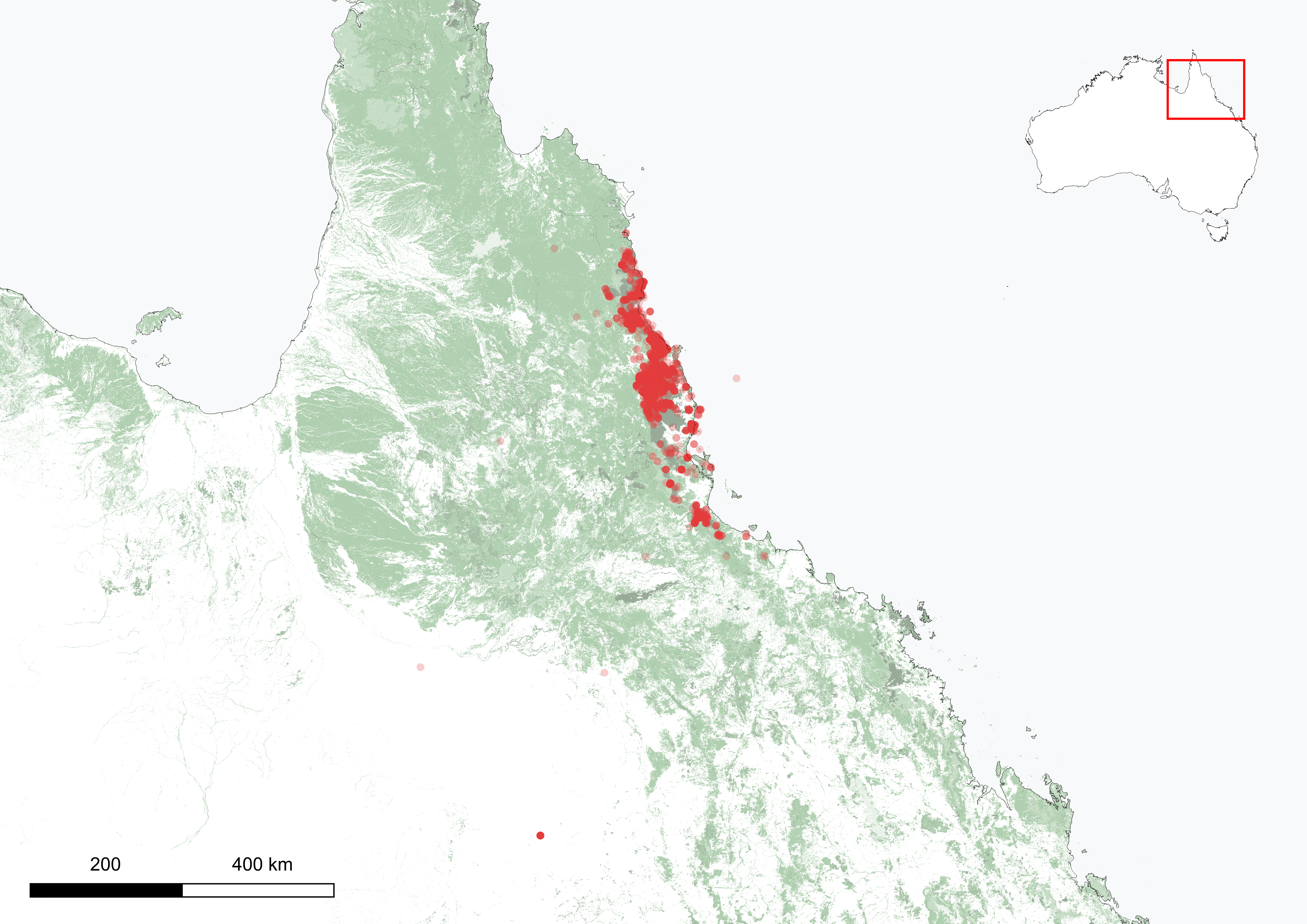
- Species distribution in North Queensland

Synonyms
- Lophorina victoriae

= Victoria's riflebird =

Species of bird

Victoria's riflebird (Ptiloris victoriae), also known as the lesser riflebird, Queen Victoria riflebird, Queen Victoria's riflebird, or Victoria riflebird, is a bird-of-paradise endemic to the Atherton Tableland region of northeastern Queensland, Australia where it resides year-round.

== Taxonomy and systematics ==
The Victoria's riflebird was discovered by John Macgillivray for John Gould in 1848 and is named after Queen Victoria of the United Kingdom. The common name "riflebird" comes from the likeness of their black velvety plumage to the uniform of the British Army Rifle Brigade.

== Description ==
The smallest riflebird, it measures between 23–25 cm. Males have an iridescent purple sheen plumage, which becomes more blue-green on the head and more bronze on the lower breast. The throat is velvety black with a metallic green and blue triangular patch in the center. Females have a pale eyebrow, and the buff underparts are faintly barred with brown.

== Behavior ==
=== Breeding ===
When the male begins to display, he erects the feathers of his throat and sides to accentuate the bright colours of his plumage in the shafts of sunlight that pierce the dimness of the rainforest. He curves his rounded wings above his body and tilts his head back to expose his chin and throat to the light, and then moves from side to side in a fashion that looks almost mechanical.

The female is attracted to the male's display post by his raspy 'yaars' call, which becomes softer and more tuneful during the display.

The pair then face each other closely, and each bird raises and extends its wings forward alternately in an increasingly rapid rhythm. Finally the male embraces the female with both wings, and copulation ensues.

=== Male display ===
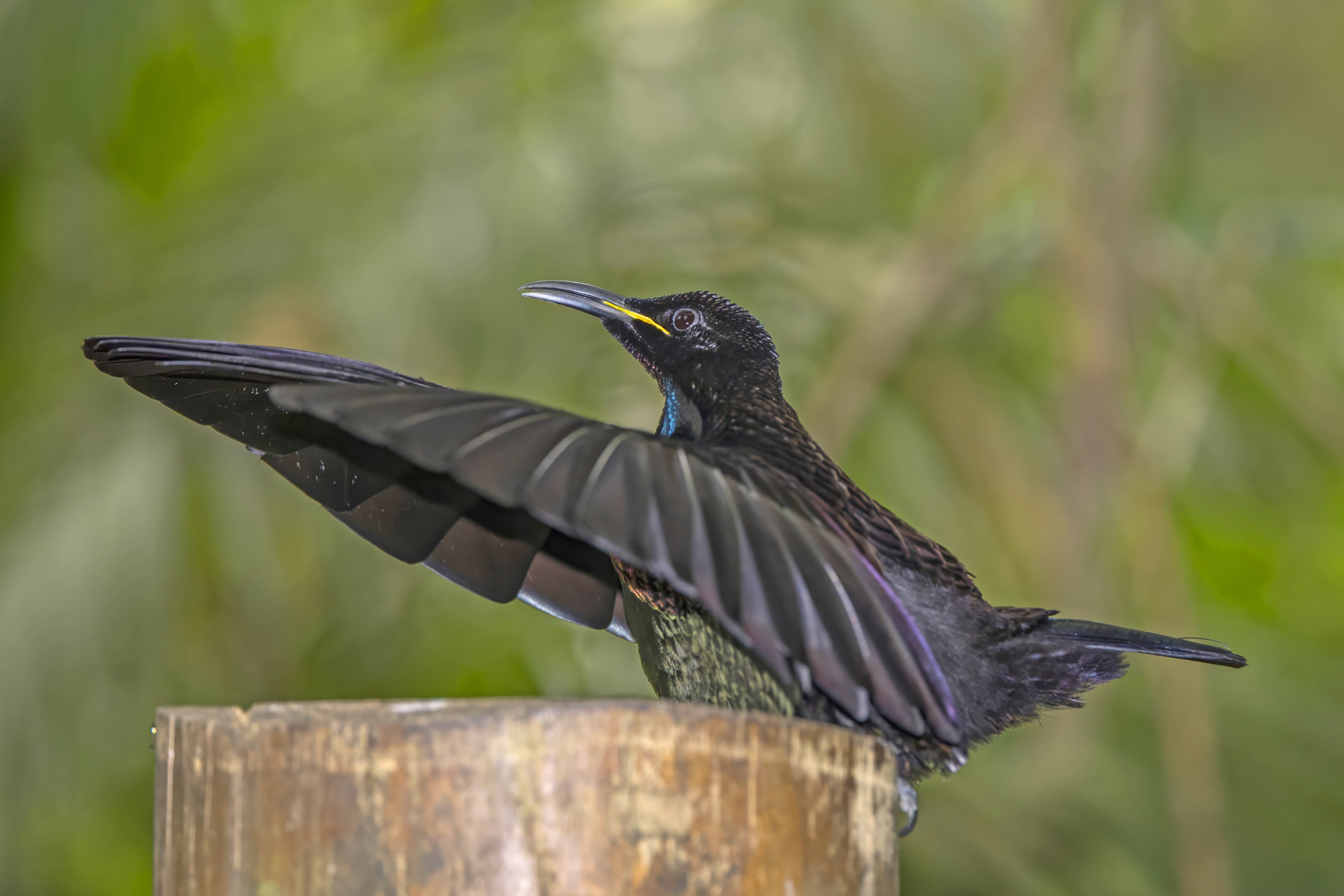

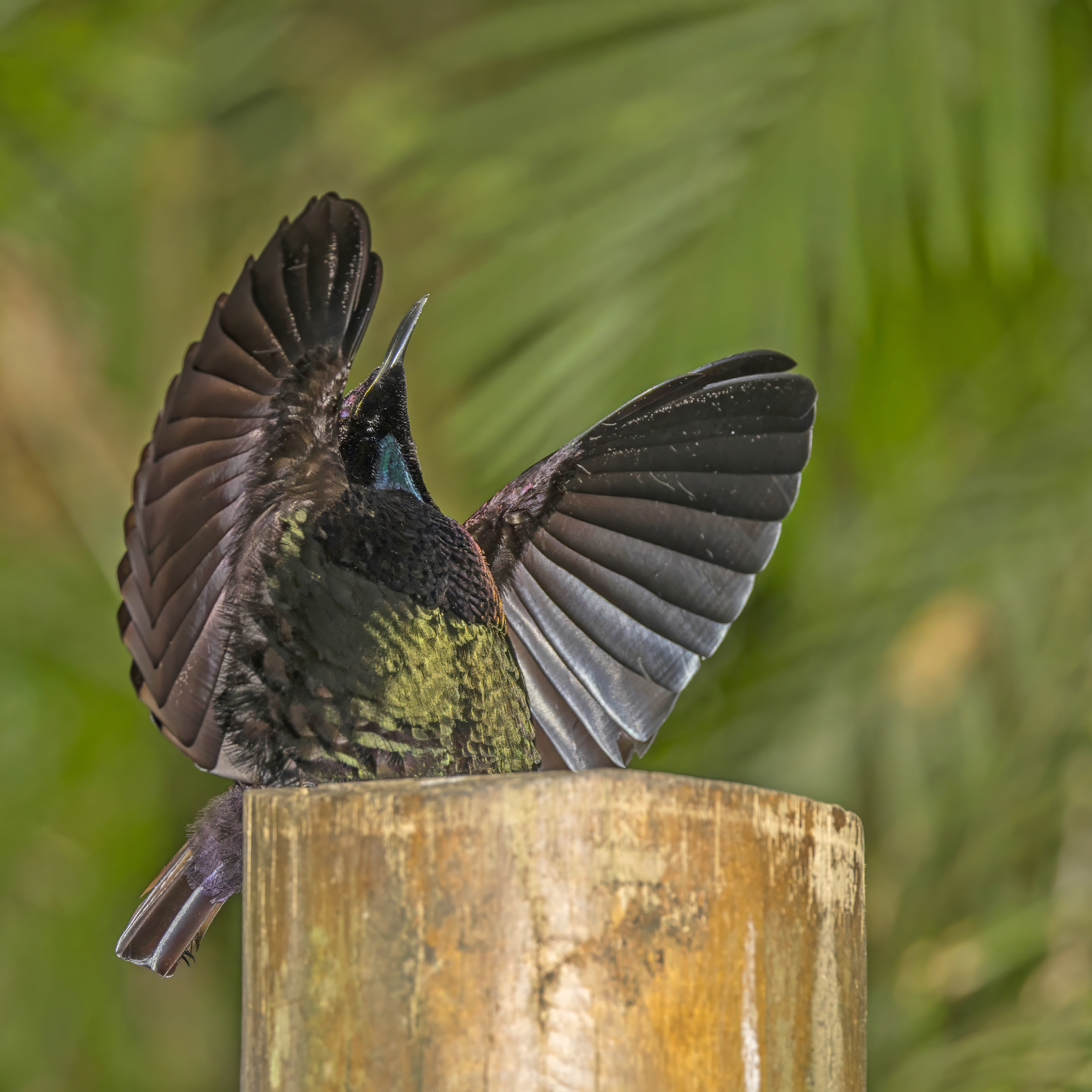

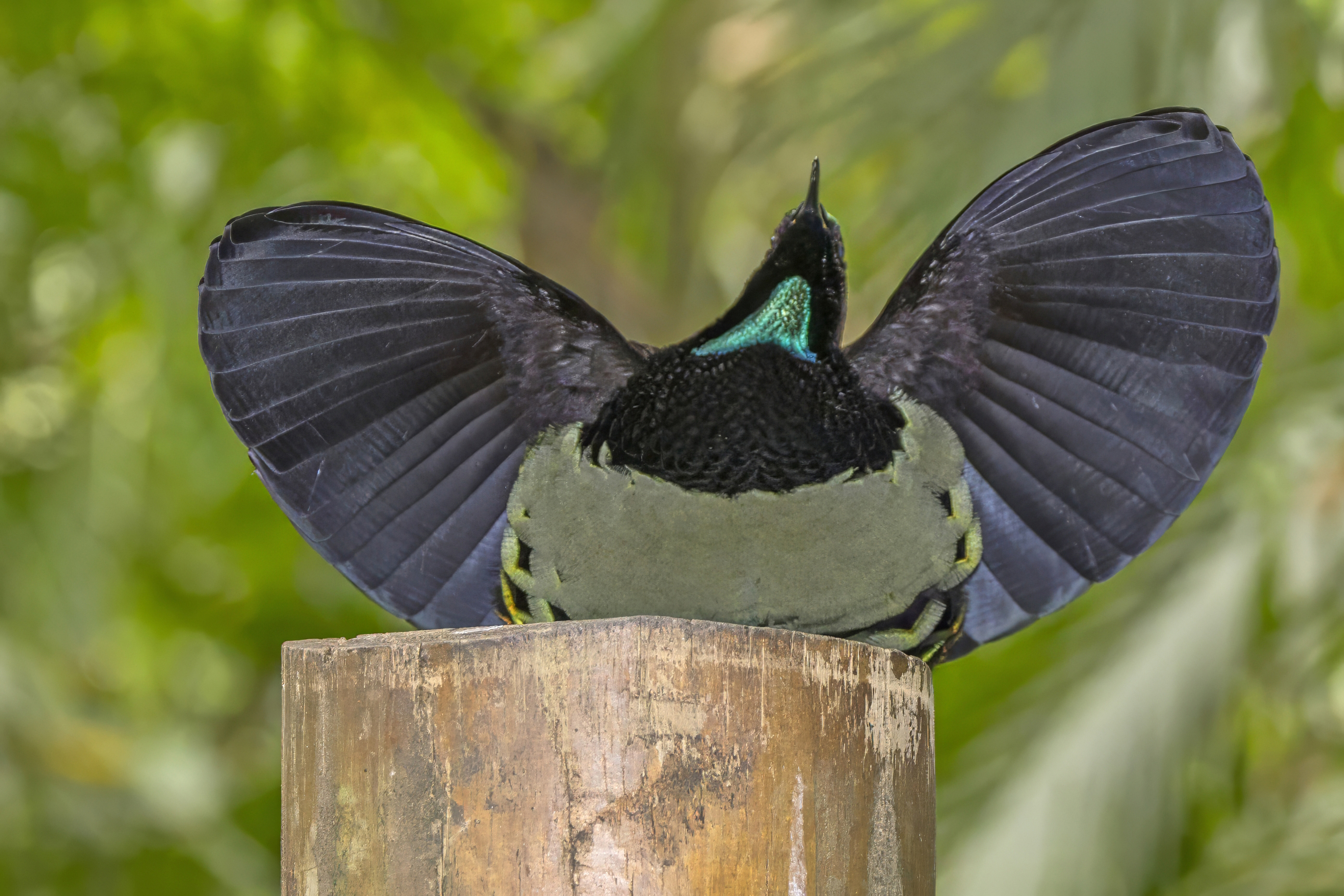

=== Feeding ===
As well as insects, they eat fruits from the trees, some which they peel by holding the fruit with one foot and removing the skin with their bill.

== Status ==
The Victoria's riflebird is evaluated as Vulnerable on the IUCN Red List of Threatened Species. It is listed on Appendix II of CITES.
